= List of equipment of the Philippine Army =

This is a list of equipment used by the Philippine Army, the branch of the Armed Forces of the Philippines that specializes in ground warfare. The service has made use of its existing equipment to fulfill its mandate while modernization projects are underway. Republic Act No. 7898 declares the policy of the State to modernize the military to a level where it can effectively and fully perform its constitutional mandate to uphold the sovereignty and preserve the patrimony of the republic. The law, as amended, has set conditions that should be satisfied when the defense department procures major equipment and weapon systems for the army.

== Armored vehicles ==
Image	Model	Origin	Type	Variant	In Service	Notes
Tanks and fire support vehicles
	Sabrah	Spain; Israel	Light tank	Sabrah ASCOD 2	13 (+15)	ASCOD 2 fitted with Elbit Systems "Sabrah" turret with a 105mm gun.
	M113 FSV	United States; Israel	Fire support vehicle	M113A2+ FSV M113A1 FSV	14 4	Former Belgian Land Component M113A1B upgraded to M113A2+ standard, integrated by Elbit Systems with turret and 76mm L23A1 gun from decommissioned FV101 Scorpion CVR(T). Several M113A1 armed with the 76mm L23A1 gun and turret, previously converted in-house by the Philippine Army.
	FV101 Scorpion	United Kingdom	Reconnaissance vehicle/light tank	FV101 Scorpion	1	1 unit confirmed to have been Returned to service in 2024. Up to 12 units planned for reactivation.
Infantry fighting vehicles
	AIFV	United States	Infantry fighting vehicle	AIFV-25 PIFV-12.7	38 13	All delivered in 1979–1980.
	FMC M113 IFV	United States; Israel	Infantry fighting vehicle	M113A2+ IFV	4	Former Belgian Land Component M113A1B upgraded to M113A2+ standard, integrated with UT25 remote weapon station with 25mm Bushmaster gun.
	GKN Simba IFV 4x4	United Kingdom; Philippines	Infantry fighting vehicle	GKN Simba IFV	9	9 units of IFV versions armed with 25mm Bushmaster cannon, currently used by the Presidential Security Command
Armored personnel carriers
	ACV-15	Turkey	Armoured personnel carrier	ACV-15 APC	6	Vehicles are upgraded with FNSS Saber turrets with 12.7mm heavy machine guns and 40 mm automatic grenade launchers.
	M113	United States	Armoured personnel carrier / Armored ambulance / Armored mortar carrier	M113A1 M113A2 M113A2+ M125A2	150 65 50 21	M113A1s were acquired between 1967 and 2006, with about 150 remaining in service. In 2015, 114 surplus M113A2 APCs were received from the United States Army and commissioned in January 2016. Of these, 44 were upgraded to M113A2+ with Elbit 12.7 mm ORCWS and five converted to M125A2 mortar carriers, leaving 65 in standard M113A2 configuration. Six former Belgian Land Component M113A1B vehicles were also upgraded by Elbit Systems, bringing the M113A2+ total to 50. A further 15 M125A2s armed with Cardom 120 mm mortars from Soltam were delivered in 2021, raising the M125A2 fleet to 21.
	IVECO Guarani	Brazil	Armoured personnel carrier	IVECO Guarani 6x6	14 (+14)	Elbit Systems won the Wheeled Armored Personnel Carrier Acquisition Project of the Philippine Army and is set to deliver 28 units of the Guarani 6x6 APC.
	GKN FS100 Simba 4×4	United Kingdom; Philippines	Armoured personnel carrier	APC 12.7mm Armored Ambulance	142	150 units delivered between 1993 and 1997. Out of the total, 142 units were assembled in the Philippines. 17 armored ambulances, and a command vehicle.
	Cadillac Gage Commando 4×4	United States	Armoured personnel carrier	V-150 V-150S	130	Total 155 delivered, some with the Marine Corps. Others in service with the Armor Division. Delivery starting 1975. Some stretched V-150S variants.
Mine resistant ambush protected vehicles
	CS/VP3 MRAP	China	MRAP	CS/VP3	3	The Philippine Army received 4 units of CS/VP3 MRAPs as part of the Chinese military assistance upon the request of the Duterte Administration. Equipped with a Remotely Controlled Weapon System and Electronic Warfare Suite. 1 unit confirmed transferred to the Philippine Marine Corps.
Armored light tactical vehicle
	AM General HMMWV	United States	Armored tactical vehicle	M1025P1 M1114	unknown	Up-armored variants, with some M1025P1s provided in the mid-2000s, and 25 M1114 provided in 2013 shared between the Philippine Army and PNP-SAF. Assigned with the Armor Division and Special Operations Command. More up-armored variants were requested from US Excess Defense Articles and are expected in the near future. Mostly equipped with M2 Browning MG or M134D Miniguns.
	Kia KLTV	South Korea	Armored tactical vehicle	K153	2	Donated by Kia Motors for evaluation for future Light Tactical Vehicle requirement. Currently used for convoy escort duties. 1 transferred to the Philippine Marine Corps.
	Steelcraft MX-8 Armored Escort Vehicle	Philippines	Armored tactical vehicle	MX-8 Mk. 2	1	One prototype put to service, with Mk. 2 vehicle in service with the 8th Infantry division.

== Combat support vehicles ==
Image	Model	Origin	Type	Variant	In Service	Notes
Command vehicles
	GDELS ASCOD	Spain; Israel	Command vehicle	ASCOD CV	1	ASCOD 2 is fitted with specialized communications for command and control, similar to British Army's Athena C2 vehicle.
	M934 command vehicle	United States	Command vehicle	M934 Mobile Command Post	unknown	M939 series 5-ton truck,
Recovery vehicles
	GDELS ASCOD	Spain; Israel	Armoured recovery vehicle	ASCOD ARV	1	ASCOD 2 is fitted for the repair and recovery of other armored vehicles, similar to the British Army's Apollo vehicle. Included in contract with Elbit Systems for Sabrah light tank system.
	AIFV ARV	United States; Israel Turkey	Armoured recovery vehicle	YPR-806 ACV-15 ARV	10 1	6 AIFV ARVs based on YPR-806 were received from the US in 1979. 4 units of upgraded YPR-806 from Belgian Army stocks were acquired from Israel in 2015. An ACV-300 ARV was acquired from Turkey in 2004.
Combat engineering equipment
	Merkava 4 AVLB Tagash	Israel	Armoured vehicle-launched bridge	Merkava 4 AVLB Tagash	2	Based on the M1074 Joint Assault Bridge, its bridge has a longer span, and it uses a Merkava Mk. IV chassis as its platform. Two units were delivered in July 2022.
	Norinco GQL-111	China	Vehicle-launched bridge	GQL-111	3	Truck-based scissor-type bridge with 15m length and 50-tonne capacity, donated by China as part of military assistance program in 2022. At least 3 units is confirmed by photo.
	WFEL Dry Support Bridge	United Kingdom	Dry support bridge		2	Two sets of Dry Support Bridges, complete with the transport trucks, handling systems and all other accessories plus the Integrated Logistics Support (ILS) are part of the deal, which is estimated to be worth Php1.25 billion. The PA variant will be using the RMMV HX45M 10x10 truck as platform.
	FNSS Kunduz	Turkey	Armored combat earthmover		6	An improved version of the M9 ACE by adding amphibious capabilities, as well as improved armor protection for the crew.
	Armtrac 100-350	United Kingdom	Vehicle-mounted mine detection	100-350 Mk.2	4	They were acquired under the Mounted Mine Detector Acquisition Project of the Philippine Army. Two vehicles were delivered in March 2022, and another 2 vehicles delivered in September 2022.
	Çukurova 4x4x4	Turkey	Armored Backhoe Loader	4x4x4	-(+6)	To be delivered as part of efforts to improve the service's combat engineering capabilities.
	Jonyang GDG130	China	Armored Backhoe Loader	GDG130	unknown	License-copy of the Thales Australia High Speed Engineering Vehicle (HSEV). At least 2 up-armored units were donated by the Chinese Government in 2022.
	CASE 1650L	United States	Medium armored bulldozer	560L Armored	3	Civilian bulldozer based on Case 1650L, uparmored locally. At least 3 were identified and used in Marawi campaign in 2017.

== Utility vehicles ==
Image	Model	Origin	Type	Variant	In Service	Notes
All-Terrain vehicles
	Kawasaki Teryx	Japan	Utility task vehicle	Teryx	unknown	Provided under US Military Assistance Program, used by units of the Special Operations Command.
	Can-Am Defender	Canada; United States	All-terrain vehicle	Defender MAX XT HD10	15	Acquired for Special Operations units, delivered in 2020.
Tactical Military Vehicles
	HMMWV	United States	Light utility vehicle	M998 M1025 M1038	unknown	Provided by the US as AID in the late 1980s, divided into several variants and series, M998 & M1038(troop/cargo carrier), and M1025 weapons carriers, and are divided to all AFP service branches and the Philippine National Police-Special Action Force. Mostly equipped with M2 Browning MG, while some are equipped with Recoilless rifles, and Miniguns.
	Maxi-Ambulance	United States	Field ambulance	M1152	49	23 units donated brand new By United States of America to AFP in November 2011, PMC received 4 units. 23 M1152s were formally handed to the Army in January 2015; 7 more arrived in February 2015.
	BAW BJ2022	China	3/4-ton utility vehicle	BJ2034 single-cab	49	49 units delivered in July 2021, acquired through public tender under the Trucks Troop Carrier Light Acquisition Project in 2020.
	KIA KM450 Series	Republic of Korea	1 1/4-ton utility vehicle Field ambulance	KM-450 KM-451 KM-452	1,197 120 5	The AFP acquired a total of 1,595 km-450 and KM-451 trucks as of September 2016. Initial purchases included 651 km-450 units in 2007 (603 for the Army and the remainder for General Headquarters and the Air Force), 137 in 2010. 190 more were delivered in 2013, with an additional 219 in January 2016 and further batches expected. KM-451 units included 60 purchased in 2012 (48 for the Army) and another 60 ordered in 2015. Some vehicles were converted into Tactical Assault Ladder variants. Other configurations include armed troop transports with armored rear cabins and 7.62 mm machine guns, command and signals vehicles, CBRN vehicles, parade vehicles, and assault vehicles for special operations forces.
	GAZ Sadko	Russia	2-ton utility vehicle	GAZ Sadko	90	The Truck Troop Carrier Light involving 90 trucks was awarded to ConEquip Philippines Inc. on Feb. 11, 2021.
	KIA KM250 series	Republic of Korea	2 1/2-ton utility vehicle	KM-250 Cargo KM-250 Wrecker	661(+49) 10	In service since 2011, 250 units were initially delivered. 190 units more KM-250 cargo trucks and 10 km-250 wreckers were delivered as of 2018. As of January 2022, 661 km-250 cargo trucks were reported to be in service. On 29 December 2025, a Notice of Award was issued to Hyundai Corporation for the acquisition of 49 additional KM-250 trucks.
	M35 series	United States	2 1/2-ton utility vehicle	M35A1/A2/A3 M36A2 M59A1/A2 M60A1/A2/A3 M109A3	unknown	Divided into several variants and series, in service with the PA since the early 1960s. Hundreds of assorted units in A2 and A3 series were delivered between 2000 and 2013, including 90 units delivered in June 2011. More being acquired from US EDA stocks to increase inventory and replace older variants
	Dongfeng EQ2082 series	China	2 1/2-ton utility vehicle	EQ2082 6x6 Troop Carrier	18	18 units delivered in July 2021, procured through public bidding under Truck Troop Carrier Medium Acquisition Project in 2020.
	Isuzu N-Series	Japan; Philippines	3 1/2-ton utility vehicle	NPS 4x4 Troop Carrier NPS 4x4 Field Ambulance	117	117 units NPS 4x4 light troop carrier trucks delivered to the Philippine Army on 31 March 2026.
	Dongfeng EQ2102 series	China	3 1/2-ton utility vehicle	EQ2102 6x6 Water purification truck	unknown	Several units with water purification systems were delivered as part of a grant by the Chinese government in 2022.
	Dongfeng DF1180 series	China	3 1/2-ton utility vehicle	DF1180 6x6 Surgical trucks	unknown	Several units with truck-mounted surgical unit, delivered as part of field hospital system delivered by a Turkish company in 2022.
	Sinotruk Homan H3	China	4-ton utility vehicle	H3 4x4 Field Ambulance	3	3 units, all in Field Ambulance configuration, were delivered in July 2021, and acquired through public tender under the Trucks Field Ambulance Acquisition Project in 2020.
	Isuzu F-Series	Japan; Philippines	6-ton utility vehicle	FTS 4x4 Troop Carrier FTS 4x4 Cargo/Troop Carrier	unknown 88	88 units FTS 4x4 medium troop carrier trucks delivered to the Philippine Army on 31 March 2026.
	KIA KM500 series	Republic of Korea	5-ton utility vehicle	KM-500 KM-503	6 12	KM-500 as 155mm Artillery prime mover, KM-503 tractor head for flat-bed trailers. 1st batch of 6 km-500 delivered in 2012. km-503 delivered in 2013.
	M939 series	United States	5-ton utility Vehicle	M923 M929 M931 M934 M936	unknown	20 M923 delivered in 2010, several more of derent variants delivered in 2013, including 10 M936 van variants.
	M809 series	United States	5-ton utility vehicle	M813 M814 M816	unknown	M813, M814 cargo trucks and M816 wrecker. Gradually being replaced by more M939 and KM50 series 5-ton 6×6 trucks.
M-52 REO Truck, Tractor, 5 Ton, 6x6, Multi- Fuel, undergoing installation of Hydrovac Mechanism with New Repair Kit Assembly conducted by Mechanic Team at Motorpool, Camp Tito B Abat, Manaoag, Pangasinan on 09 May 2017	M54 series	United States	5-ton utility vehicle	M52	unknown	
	Sinotruk Howo	China	8-ton utility vehicle	Howo ZZ2167 4x4 Troop Carrier; Howo ZZ2257 6x6 Cargo Truck	unknown	Several cargo trucks donated by Chinese Government in 2022, used by HADR units.
	Ural 4320	Russia	8-ton heavy utility vehicle / Mobile medical surgery trucks	Ural 4320	20	Donated by the Russian government to the Philippine government in October 2017. At least 1 confirmed to have been converted to a mobile medical surgery truck.
	Rheinmetall MAN Military Vehicles TG MIL	Austria; Germany	Self-propelled howitzer platform 10-ton utility	TGS-Mil 6x6 TGM-Mil 6x6	unknown	Armored version used as platform for ATMOS wheeled 155mm self-propelled howitzer, while standard versions used as ammunition carrier and support vehicles.
	Freightliner M915 series	United States	14-ton utility vehicle	M916A1 M916A1 Wrecker	unknown	Acquired in 1996. M916A1 tractor head for flat-bed tank transporters. A few M916A1 were modified to wrecker configuration. All are operated by the Mechanized Infantry Division.
	Scania G-series	Sweden	14-ton heavy utility vehicle	Scania G 500 XT Heavy Equipment Transporter	15	Delivered in 2025 and assigned to Armor "Pambato" Division
Commercial Light vehicles
	Sinotruk Howo	China	20-ton utility truck	NX Wing Van	14	14 units delivered in November 2025.
	Daewoo Novus	South Korea; India	10-ton utility truck	Mobile Kitchen	unknown	Used as large mobile kitchen trucks
	Hino Dutro	Japan; Philippines	3-ton utility vehicle	Hino 300 Light Troop Carrier Hino 300 Mobile Kitchen	unknown	Only used for paved road cargo and troop transport duties, used mostly with urban units like the AFP Joint Task Force-National Capital Region and Civil-Military Operations units. Also used as a platform for Mobile Field Kitchen.
	Isuzu N-Series	Japan; Philippines	1.5-ton utility vehicle	5th-gen NHR Light Troop Carrier 6th-gen NMR Assault Ladder	unknown	5th generation NHR units light troop carrier trucks, used only for paved road cargo and troop transport duties, used mostly with urban units like the AFP Joint Task Force-National Capital Region and Civil-Military Operations units. 6th-generation NMR used as assault ladder by Special Operations Command.
	Mitsubishi Fuso Canter	Japan; Philippines	1.5-ton utility vehicle	Canter	unknown	Light truck used only for paved road cargo and troop transport duties, used mostly with urban units like the AFP Joint Task Force-National Capital Region and Civil-Military Operations units.
	Toyota Hi-Lux	Japan	Light utility vehicle	Hilux AN120-AN130 Hilux N140-N170	>725 unknown	Hilux AN120-AN130 models are used as field staff vehicles by all Army battalions and Special Operations Command units. Older N140-N170 variants are seen used by Military Police and other support units. 225 additional units were delivered in 2021. This is in addition to more than 250 units delivered to the Philippine Army since 2018.
	Nissan Navara	Japan	1-ton utility vehicle	Navara D23 Navara D40	unknown	Used as field staff vehicles by Army battalions, also used by Military Police with at least 8 units are with the 11th Infantry Division, and other support units.
	Mitsubishi Strada	Japan	1-ton utility vehicle	L200, Fifth generation (KJ/KK/KL; 2015)	unknown	Used by Military Police and other support units.
Toyota Innova 2.7 G (Bahrain)	Toyota Innova	Japan	1-ton utility vehicle	Second generation (AN140; 2015)	unknown	Used by AFP General Headquarters and the Philippine Army Command .
Royal Thai Army, Toyota Hiace ambulance.	Toyota Hiace	Japan	1-ton utility vehicle	Fifth generation (H200; 2004), Sixth generation (H300; 2019)	unknown	Used by AFP Medical Command .
20210511 A Ford Transit Ambulance at Zhengzhou Central Hospital	Ford Transit	China	1-ton utility vehicle	China Third generation Transit (2009–2023)	unknown	Used by AFP Medical Command . Donated by Republic of China in 2022.
	Toyota Corolla	Japan	Military Police Car	Tenth generation (E140, E150; 2006)	unknown	Used by Military Police.
Motorcycles
Honda CRF150L - Indonesia International Motor Show 2018 - April 26, 2018.	Honda CRF 150L	Japan	Military Motorcycle	Honda CRF 150L	unknown	Used by 10th Infantry Division.Donated by large Cavendish banana producing firm in Region 11 in 2024.
Ktm duke 390	KTM Duke 390	Austria	Military Motorcycle	KTM Duke 390	unknown	Used by GHQ & Headquarters Service and AFP Office of Legislative Affair
Engineering / Construction / Logistics Support vehicles
	Daewoo Novus	South Korea	Utility truck	Novus AWS Wrecker	4	4 new wreckers were acquired by Philippine Army in 2018.
	Scania G500	Sweden	Heavy Equipment Transporter	G500 XT		5 trucks together with Front Loading Low Bed Tridem Trailers made by Thaco Trailers Vietnam were inducted on 20 June 2025.
	Iveco 682	China	Dump truck Heavy Equipment Transporter	Iveco 682		Based on a Chinese model produced by Iveco SAIC Honyan Motors. At least 12 dump trucks and 5 tractor heads were delivered in September 2020.
	Hyundai Trago	South Korea	Dump truck	Trago HD670		
	Isuzu Giga	Japan	Dump truck Crane Truck	Giga CYZ Giga VC46		Dump trucks Acquired under AFP Civil Engineering Equipment project under Horizon 1 phase. Crane trucks were delivered in 2020, equipped with Palfinger SPS40000 16-ton crane.
	Shaanxi Shacman F2000	China	Dump truck	F2000 SX33 Dump Truck F2000 SX33 Water Tanker		Acquired under AFP Civil Engineering Equipment project under Horizon 1 phase.
	Fiori DB	Italy	Self-loading concrete mixer	DB110		
	Sany SY	China	Concrete mixer	SY306C-6		Acquired under AFP Civil Engineering Equipment project under Horizon 1 phase.
	Sany SSR	China	Road roller	SSR110-C		Acquired under AFP Civil Engineering Equipment project under Horizon 1 phase.
	Vibromax 1102	United Kingdom	Road roller	1102D		
	Sany STG	China	Grader	STG180C-6		Acquired under AFP Civil Engineering Equipment project under Horizon 1 phase.
	CASE 845B	United States	Grader	845B		
	Sany STC	China	Mobile crane	STC250T4		Acquired under AFP Civil Engineering Equipment project under Horizon 1 phase.
	Sany SYL	China	Wheeled loader	SYL956H5		Acquired under AFP Civil Engineering Equipment project under Horizon 1 phase.
	LiuGong CLG355	China	Skid loader	CLG355A		Acquired under AFP Civil Engineering Equipment project under Horizon 1 phase.
	Toyota SDK	Japan	Skid loader	SDK6		
	CASE W24	United States	Scoop loader	W24B		
	JLG PS	United States	Telescopic handler	1400PS		
	JCB 540 series	United Kingdom	Telescopic handler	540-200		
	LiuGong CLG766	China	Backhoe loader	CLG766A		Acquired under AFP Civil Engineering Equipment project under Horizon 1 phase.
	XGMA XG765	China	Backhoe loader	XG765		
	JCB 3CX	United Kingdom	Backhoe loader	3CX800		
	JCB JS	United Kingdom	Excavator	JS200		
	Samsung SE210	Republic of Korea	Excavator	SE210LC-2		
	Shantui DH	China	Bulldozer	DH08-B2		At least 8 units assigned to 55th Engineering Brigade.
	HBXG SD Series	China	Bulldozer	SD5K		Several units available.
	Sinomach T120N	China	Bulldozer	T120N		
	CASE 1650	United States	Bulldozer	1650L		
	CASE D7	United States	Bulldozer	D7G		
	Dresser DT20	United States	Bulldozer	DT20G		

== Artillery ==
Image	Model	Origin	Type	Variant	In Service	Notes
Mortar
	M6 mortar	Bulgaria	60 mm commando mortar 60 mm mortar	M60CMA M60MA	unknown	Used by First Special Forces Regiment. Adopted to replace M-75 60 mm mortars.
	M224 mortar	United States	60 mm mortar	M224	>44	In service since 2012. Additional 44 brand new units delivered in March 2019.
	M75	Philippines	60 mm mortar	M75	unknown	Several hundred units were produced as part of the AFP Self-Reliance Defense Posture Program starting 1977. Being replaced by M224 and M60 mortars.
	M8 mortar	Bulgaria	81 mm mortar	M81MA	unknown	Adopted to replace M29 81 mm mortars.
	M69 mortar	Serbia	81 mm mortar	M69B	100	M69A introduced in the 1990s as part of US military assistance, re-chambered from original 82 mm. M69B purpose-built 81 mm mortar introduced in 2012.
	M29 mortar	United States	81 mm mortar	M29	400	
	Soltam Cardom	Israel	81 mm self-propelled mortar 120 mm self-propelled mortar	Cardom 81 Cardom 120	6 15	120 mm conversion barrels acquired to convert the Soltam Cardom 81 mm RMS acquired earlier.
Field artillery
	M101	United States	105 mm towed howitzer	M101 M101/30	118 12	Total 150 delivered, some with Marine Corps. Delivered in 1957–1958. 12 units upgraded to M101/30 in 1997 by GIAT Industries, replacing the old barrel with ones similar to those used on the GIAT LG1 Mk.II howitzer.
	M102	United States	105 mm towed howitzer	M102	24	Delivered in 1981.
	OTO Melara Model 56/14 Pack Howitzer	Italy	105 mm towed howitzer	Mod 56	100	Total 120 delivered, some with Marine Corps. Delivered in 1983.
	M3	United States	105 mm towed howitzer	M3	unknown	For ceremonial gun salute purposes only, in limited numbers.
	M114	United States	155 mm towed howitzer	M114A1	12	Delivered in 1972.
	Soltam M-71	Israel	155 mm towed howitzer	M-71	18	14 delivered in 1983, at least 2 now out of service and are museum pieces. Another 6 units were delivered in July 2017 as part of the Revised AFP Modernization Program Horizon 1 phase.
	ATMOS 2000	Israel	155 mm self-propelled howitzer	ATMOS 2000	12	Two batteries which consists of 6 mobile firing units each (12 total) has been delivered by Elbit Systems.

== Air Defense ==
Image	Model	Origin	Type	Variant	In Service	Notes
Anti-aircraft gun
	M39 cannon	USA	20mm Towed Anti-aircraft gun	M39	-	In limited numbers, taken from the Philippine Air Force's retired Northrop F-5 fighters.

== Aircraft ==
Image	Model	Origin	Type	Variant	In Service	Notes
Fixed-wing aircraft
	Short 330	United Kingdom	Utility aircraft		1	Donated by mining firm Semirara Mining and Power Corporation.
	Cessna 421	United States	Utility aircraft	421B	1	In service (PA-021)
	Cessna 206	United States	Utility aircraft	Standard	2	In service (PA-071 & PA-072)
	Cessna 172	United States	Utility aircraft	Cessna 172M	3	In service (PA-101, PA-103 & PA-911)
	Cessna 150	United States	Utility aircraft	Cessna 150	1	In service (PA-501)
Rotary wing aircraft
	MBB Bo 105	Germany	Utility helicopter	Bo-105	4	t/n 203 donated by Manny V. Pangilinan, to be used to prepare for larger helicopters. t/n 224 donated by Dornier Technologies in October 2022. t/n 222 and 223 are also donated by still unidentified groups.
	Bell 412	Canada Japan	Air ambulance	Bell 412EPX	(+2)	2 on order
	Robinson R44	United States	Training helicopter	R44 Raven II	2	In service.
Unmanned aerial vehicle
	Elbit Hermes 450	Israel	Medium altitude long endurance unmanned aerial system	Hermes 450	4 UAVs in 1 system	Classified as Tier III UAV under US/Philippine Army designation. Each system has 4 UAVs and ground control system.
	Elbit Skylark 3	Israel	Small long endurance UAV	Skylark 3	21 UAVs in 7 systems	Classified as Tier II UAV under US/Philippine Army designation. Division-level UAS. Each system has 3 UAVs and ground control system.
	Elbit Skylark I	Israel	Miniature UAV	Skylark I-LEX	129 UAVs in 43 systems	Classified as Tier I UAV under US/Philippine Army designation. Brigade-level UAS. Each system has 3 UAVs and ground control system.
	Raptor and Knight Falcon	Philippines	Small UAV		2	The first drone is known as Raptor and the second drone is known as Knight Falcon while a third drone is still being made. The Raptor is smaller and has less endurance than the Knight Falcon. Only a few limited units were tested and produced, however, planned additional units were cancelled due to an alleged corruption scandal involving AFP generals involved in the project.
	Elbit Thor	Israel	Rotorcraft miniature UAV		1006 UAVs in 503 systems	Classified as Tier I UAV under US/Philippine Army designation. For use on jungle and urban operations, for use on Battalion and Company-level units. Each system has 2 UAVs and a man-portable ground control system.
	Tarot X4	China	Miniature UAV	X4	Unknown	Commercial drones bought off-the-shelf by Philippine Army units.
	DJI Phantom series	China	Miniature UAV	Phantom 3 Professional Phantom 4	Unknown	Commercial drones bought off-the-shelf by Philippine Army units.
	Mavic series	China	Miniature UAV	Platinum	Unknown	Commercial drones bought off-the-shelf by Philippine Army units.
	DJI Spark series	China	Miniature UAV	Mavic Pro Platinum	unknown	Commercial drones bought off-the-shelf by Philippine Army units. Used at Squad-level by some infantry and special forces units.

== Watercraft ==
Image	Model	Origin	Type	Variant	In Service	Notes
	Airboat	Australia	Airboat	Standard	21	Used by Special Forces Regiment. Received under the Joint Philippines-Australia Army Watercraft (JPAAW) Project.
	Orient Craft 790 Scout Boat	Philippines	Patrol boat	Orient Craft 790	8	Made by Stoneworks Specialists, used by Special Forces Regiment. Made with fibreglass by Stoneworks Specialist International, delivered starting 2020. Around 8 meters long, armed with either a 7.62mm general purpose machine gun or automatic grenade launcher. Planned total of 52 units.
	Assault Watercraft	Philippines	Riverine assault boat	9-meter FRP	20	Used by Special Forces Regiment. Made with fibreglass by Filipinas Fabricators - Colorado Shipyards, delivered starting 2009. Around 9 meters long, armed with either a 50-caliber or 7.62mm machine gun.
	Condor Scout Boats	Philippines	Riverine squad assault boat	Standard	35	12 units acquired under Project Condor, 13 units under Project Condor-2, and 10 units under Project Condor-3. 23 feet long and has a maximum speed of 39 knots, and can carry 2 crewmembers and 6 fully armed troops.
	Condor Support Boats	Philippines	Riverine assault support boat	Standard	7	Used by Special Forces Regiment. 1 unit under Project Condor, 3 units under Project Condor-2, and 3 units under Project Condor-3. Can carry 55 men or mixed with provisions & supplies. 55-feet long with a maximum speed of 24 knots.
	Motorized Banca	Philippines	Wooden motorized outrigger support boat	Standard	Unknown	Used by different Army units including the Special Forces Regiment, and comes in different sizes.
	Orient Craft 1200 Support Craft	Philippines	Riverine support boat	Orient Craft 1200	Unknown	Made by Orient Craft Stoneworks Marine, and used by Special Forces Regiment. 12.7 meters long, 7-tons coastal/riverine support boat.
	Riverine Patrol Boat	Philippines	Riverine patrol boat	Standard	1	Used by Special Operations Command 4th Special Forces Battalion. At least 15 meters long, armed with 12.7mm machine guns. Used for patrol and ferrying troops.

== Infantry equipment ==
Image	Model	Origin	Type	Variant	Notes
	Philippine Army Combat Uniform	Philippines	Combat uniform	Philippine Army Pattern (PHILARPAT)	Standard issue combat uniform. Introduced in the late 2010s and was based on HyperStealth Industries' CAMOPAT but developed locally, and features pixelated digital pattern and using lightweight moisture-wicking synthetic material. It also features Velcro-closure pockets, reinforced knee and elbows, and Velco-attached patches.
	Philippine Army Battle Dress Uniform (PABDU)	Philippines	Combat uniform	AFP Disruptive Pattern Material (DPM)	Used by the Philippine Army and Philippine Air Force, as well as AFP Service Support Units. Being phased out from the Philippine Army, it was widely used from the 1980s up to the late‑2010s, before being gradually replaced by the new Philippine Army Pattern (PHILARAT)-based battle dress attire that features digital camouflage. It was based on a Woodlands pattern of the Disruptive Pattern Material, made of cotton ripstop that is durable but heavier than more modern designs. Still being used by CAFGU paramilitary units and Army Reserve Command units.
	Special Forces Distinctive Uniform	Philippines	Combat uniform	Special Forces Distinctive Uniform (SFDU)	Used by the Philippine Army Special Forces Regiment (Airborne).
	Scout Ranger Distinct Uniform	Philippines	Combat uniform	Scout Ranger Black Digital Uniform	Used by the Philippine Army First Scout Ranger Regiment, replacing the previous all-black uniform which was found to be easy to copy by non-authorized groups.
	SOCOM Distinct Uniform	United States	Combat uniform	PASOCOM Multicam	Used by the Philippine Army Special Operations Command, manufactured by Crye Precision based on their G3 combat uniform. This pattern was introduced in the early 202s and replaced several combat uniform patterns used by the First Scout Ranger Regiment and Light Reaction Regiment.
	AFP JSOC Distinct Uniform (AFPJSOCDU)	Philippines	Battle Dress Uniform	AFP JSOC Battle Dress Uniform	Standard BDU of the AFP Joint Special Operations Command, which also includes units from the Philippine Army.
	Flight Suit	Philippines	Flight Suit		Standard flight suit for Philippine Army aviators.
	Rayadillo Full Dress Uniform	Philippines	Ceremonial uniform	Rayadillo Full Dress Uniform	Standard issue honor guard uniform used by the Security and Escort Battalion.
	General Office Uniform	Philippines	Office uniform	General Office Uniform	Standard issue uniform for daily administrative tasks, office work within military installations, and routine garrison duties.
	Advanced Combat Helmet (ACH)	United States India	Combat helmet	US ACH varieties MKU Kavro ACH-125T	Current main standard issue helmet, replacing the PASGT helmet and overtakes the MICH helmet in recent procurements. SOCOM units received US-made models as part of US Military Assistance, while all other units use mostly Indian-made versions from MKU Ltd. Features Level IIA ballistic protection and mounting system for night vision goggles.
	FAST	United States	Special Operations Combat helmet	Ops Core FAST XP; Team Wendy EXFIL SL	Used by Special Force Regiment and SOCOM. US-made models were acquired from US Military Assistance and mostly provided to SOCOM units.
	MKU Kavro HCH series	India	Special Operations Combat helmet	Kavro HCH-111B	Used by Special Force Regiment and SOCOM, purchased through several contracts.
	CVCH	United States	Vehicular combat helmet		Standard issue for armored vehicle crewmen.
	Modular Integrated Communications Helmet (MICH)	United States	Combat helmet	MSA Safety MICH TC-2000; Gentext MICH TC-2000; Revision Military MICH TC_2000; 3M Ceradyne L110 Combat II	Main standard issue helmet, replacing the PASGT helmet and sourced mostly from US Military Assistance programs.
	Personal Armor System for Ground Troops (PASGT) Helmet	United States South Korea	Combat helmet	UNICOR PASGT; Gentex PASGT; SPP Isratex PASGT Oriental Industries KH-B2000 "New Type Bangtan"	Previous standard issue helmet, still being used by second-line units (ie. military police, base security, artillery, logistics, etc). US-made helmets were provided as part of US Military Assistance from the 1990s to 2000s, a mix between brand new and used helmets. The KH-B2000 from Oriental Industries (now Samyang Comtech) were procured and received in early 2000s.
	Steel Helmet Model 1968 (SSh-68)	Russia	Combat helmet	SSh-68	5,000 units were donated by Russia to the Philippines in 2017. Used as helmet for training units.
	M1 helmet	United States	Combat helmet	M1	Combat helmet of the Philippine Army from the late 1940s to early 2000s, replaced the M1917 helmet used before and during World War 2, and was replaced by the PASGT helmet. Still used as helmet for training units.
	Philippine Army Military Body Armor Model 2	India	Body armor	Kavro TAC-I-IIA	Current Philippine Army spec for body armor. Most if not all contracts won by India's MKU Ltd. which supplied their TAC-I-IIA modular body armor.
	Scalable Plate Carrier	United States Philippines	Tactical vest		Standard issue tactical vest and chest rig.
	Interceptor Body Armor	United States	Body armor		Donated by the US Department of Defense, and also ordered through procurement processes undertaken by the Philippine Department of Defense.
	ALICE equipment	United States	Load-bearing equipment		

== Infantry weapons ==
Image	Model	Origin	Type	Caliber	Variant	Notes
Pistols
	M1911 pistol	United States	Semi-automatic pistol	.45 ACP	M1911A1	Standard issue sidearm, mostly issued to officers. Majority are former EDA US Army stocks made by Colt, Springfield Armory, and Remington. Being replaced by TAC Ultra FS HC and Glock 17 Gen 4 as standard sidearm of the Philippine Army.
	Rock Island Armory 1911 series	Philippines	Semi-automatic pistol	.45 ACP	TAC Ultra FS HC 45 ACP	3,000 acquired by Armed Forces of the Philippines in 2017, for issue to all service branches. Majority went to the Philippine Army. AFP ordered 60,000 units under AFP 0.45 caliber Hammer Fired Pistol acquisition project, majority expected to go to the Philippine Army.
	Glock 17	Austria	Semi-automatic pistol	9×19mm Parabellum	Glock 17 Gen 4	Contract awarded to Glock Asia Pacific in September 2017 to supply 74,861 units to the entire AFP, majority expected to go to the Army. 1st delivery expected by March–April 2018.
	BUL Cherokee	Israel	Semi-automatic pistol	9×19mm Parabellum	Cherokee FS	1,000 units Acquired through emergency procurement
	Beretta 92	Italy	Semi-automatic pistol	9×19mm Parabellum	Beretta 92	Used by SOCOM units.
Submachine guns and subcompact weapons
	Heckler & Koch MP5	Germany	Submachine gun	9×19mm Parabellum	MP5A3 MP5A5	
	FERFRANS SOAR (Special Operations Assault Rifle)	United States	Subcompact carbine	5.56×45mm NATO	SCW 7	Used by mechanized infantry assigned to Task Force Davao.
	IWI Uzi	Israel	Submachine gun	9×19mm	Uzi SMG	Still used by Military Police and Army Support Command security units.
Shotgun
	Remington Model 870	United States	Shotgun	12 Gauge	Tac-14	Breaching shotgun used by Light Reaction Regiment.
Assault rifles, Battle rifles
	Remington R4	United States	Assault rifle, Carbine	5.56×45mm NATO	R4A3	The new standard-issue rifle. 50,629 brand new units were initially ordered, 44,186 are for the Philippine Army and 6,443 are for the Philippine Marine Corps. Eventually, due to savings, another 12,657 R4A3 rifles were procured bringing the total to 56,843 rifles. Another 10,965 units R4A3 ordered in 2014–2015 as part of Second Residual purchase.
	M4/M4A1	United States	Assault rifle, Carbine	5.56×45mm NATO	Colt M4 & M4A1	Used by Special Operations Command units.
	Taurus T4	Brazil	Assault rifle, Carbine	5.56×45mm NATO	T4 14.5 inch Barrel	12,412 units delivered on late 2021 And another 1,118 units delivered as of April 2022. A new Notice of Award was released in January 2026 for a new requirement for 10,402 units.
	SIG Sauer SIGM400	United States	Carbine	5.56×45mm NATO	SIGM400	2,702 units delivered in 2019.
	Dasan DSAR	Republic of Korea	Assault rifle, Carbine	5.56×45mm NATO	DSAR-15	Contract awarded to Dasan Machineries of South Korea for a total of 15,626 units in December 2025. Another Notice of Award was released in January 2026 for a separate batch of 10,020 units.
	AKM	Soviet Union; Russia	Assault rifle	7.62×39mm	AKM	Phil. Army's 10th Field Artillery Battalion with their non-typical personal weapons kit. Back in 2017, the Armed Forces of the Philippines received 5,000 AKMs from Russia at the height of the Marawi Siege.
	AR-M1	Bulgaria	Assault rifle	7.62×39mm	AR-M52F	Acquired in limited numbers as Philippine Army diversify to include 7.62x39mm rifles together with the Russian AKM.
	Heckler & Koch HK416	Germany	Assault rifle	5.56×45mm NATO	D10RS D14.5RS	Used by Light Reaction Regiment
	CAR-15	United States; Philippines	Assault rifle, Carbine	5.56×45mm NATO	Model 733 M653 M653P	M16A1 carbine model license produced by Elisco Tool (Elitool) Philippines, designated 'M653P'. Used by secondary units, armored vehicle crew, Military Police, and Base Security units.
	M16 rifle	United States; Philippines	Assault rifle	5.56×45mm NATO	M16A1 M16A1 (enhanced) M16A2	Gradually being replaced by the Remington R4A3 in front line service. Standard issue for reservists and CAFGU units. More than 200,000 units acquired from US sources or manufactured locally by Elitool.
	GA 16" Mid-length Carbine, 5.56mm	Philippines	Assault rifle	5.56×45mm NATO	M16A1 Dissipator 16" Mid-length Carbine, 5.56mm	Refurbished and upgraded M16A1 rifles refurbished by the Government Arsenal with new old stock spare parts and newly sourced parts. 20" barrels spares with corroded bores cut down to 16" and installed in "dissipator" configuration (shortened barrel with full-length gas system). 16" mid-length carbine configuration uses newly sourced 16" Daniel Defense barrel with mid-length gas system.
	Steyr AUG	Australia	Assault rifle	5.56×45mm NATO	F88 Austeyr	Australian-sourced, manufactured by Lithgow Arms and donated by the Australian government. Used by Special Operations Command units.
	AR-M	Bulgaria	Assault rifle	7.62×39mm	AR-M52F	Philippine Army confirmed use of AR-M52F assault rifle from Bulgaria during 125th founding anniversary on 23 March 2022. Reportedly used by First Special Forces Regiment, and the 103rd Infantry Battalion.
	M14 rifle	United States	Battle rifle	7.62×51mm NATO	M14	In service as standard battle rifle and training rifle. Some units refurbished and upgraded into Designated Marksman Rifle (DMR) or Enhanced Battle Rifle (EBR) standard.
	GA SOCOM-16	United States / Philippines	Battle rifle	7.62×51mm	SOCOM-16	Used in limited numbers. Refurbished and upgraded M14 rifle by Government Arsenal, very similar to the Springfield Armory M1A SOCOM 16 rifle. Uses a 16" barrel specified for Special Operations Command units' requirement, as compared to standard M14 which uses the original 22" barrel, and EBR which uses an 18" barrel.
Semi-Automatic Rifles
	M1 Garand	United States	Semi-automatic rifle	.30-06 Springfield	M1C M1D	Used for ceremonial purposes. Others distributed to ROTC and CAFGU units armed and trained by the Philippine Army.
	M1 carbine	United States	Semi-automatic carbine	.30 Carbine	M1A1	Stored, although many are still used by CAFGU units.
Designated marksman and sniper rifles
	GA Squad Designated Marksman Rifle (SDMR), 5.56mm	Philippines	Designated marksman rifle	5.56×45mm	SDMR-16	Built by Government Arsenal upon request by Special Operations Command units. Similar in concept as the US Mk 12 Special Purpose Rifle, but uses a 16" barrel with 1:7 twist specifically requested for Special Operations Command units. It features a Bipod and a Trijicon 4 x 32 mm RCO Chevron Reticle Scope. 40 units delivered as of 2015, for use by Scout Rangers and Special Operations Command.
	SIG Sauer SIG716 DMR	United States	Designated marksman rifle	7.62×51mm NATO	SIG716 G2 16" DMR	832 units were ordered from SIG Sauer as part of the Designated Marksman Rifle acquisition project under the Horizon 1 phase project. Expected to be the new standard designated marksman rifle / battle rifle of the Philippine Army to replace the M14. An order for 310 units was made on June 2024, for delivery by June 2025.
	Knight's Armament Company SR-25	United States	Semi-automatic sniper rifle	7.62×51mm NATO	Mk.11 Mod.0	Introduced in 2004 as a primary to intermediate range semi-automatic sniper rifle used by the Special Operations Command.
	M14 rifle	United States	Designated marksman rifle	7.62×51mm NATO	M14 DMR	Standard issue marksman rifle, modified with scopes to increase effective range compared to standard M14. Different from the M21 sniper rifle. Will undergo refurbishing and upgrade into standard GA Designated Marksman Rifle (DMR) or Enhanced Battle Rifle (EMR) standard. The Army also received at least hundreds of upgraded M14 rifles donated from Jordan. To be replaced in designated marksman rifle role by SIG Sauer SIG 716.
	M24 Sniper Weapon System	United States	Sniper rifle	7.62×51mm NATO	M24A1	Introduced in 2012 to Special Operations Command as new standard intermediate range sniper rifle.
	Norinco CS/LR4	China	Sniper rifle	7.62×51mm NATO	CS/LR4A	30 units donated by the Chinese government to the AFP.
	Norinco Type 85	China	Sniper rifle	7.62×54mmR	Type 85	Estimated 60 units donated by the Chinese government to the AFP.
	M21	United States	Semi-Automatic Sniper Rifle	7.62×51mm	M21	Standard issue sniper rifle for regular infantry units. Being refurbished by Government Arsenal, while replacing key parts including installing new optics.
	Zastava M93 Black Arrow	Serbia	Anti materiel sniper rifle	.50 BMG	M93	Used by Special Forces Regiment, 37 units donated by San Miguel Corporation in 2019.
	Barrett 50 Cal/M82	United States	Anti materiel sniper rifle	.50 BMG	M82A1 M107	Standard long range & anti-materiel sniper rifle. M107s acquired through US Foreign Military Financing in 2019.
	Harris M-87	United States	Long Range Sniper Rifle	.50 BMG	M-87R	60 units ordered from Armscor Defense after winning the tender for the Long Range Sniper Rifle project under Horizon 1 phase.
Machine guns
	Daewoo Precision Industries K3	Republic of Korea	Light machine gun	5.56×45mm NATO	K3	Standard squad automatic weapon, 6,540 units acquired and in service since 2008.
	FN Minimi	Belgium	Light machine gun	5.56×45mm NATO	Minimi	402 units acquired. Additional order cancelled in favor of rebidding, which was later won by Daewoo Precision Industries' K3.
	Arsenal MG	Bulgaria	General-purpose machine gun	7.62×51mm NATO	MG-M2	Manufactured by Arsenal JSCo. of Bulgaria, based on Russian PK machine gun but using 7.62×51mm NATO round.
	FN M240	United States	General-purpose machine gun	7.62×51mm NATO	M240B M240L	General-purpose machine gun, infantry versions used by Special Forces, also used as co-axial secondary weapon of select armored vehicles.
	M60	United States	General-purpose machine gun	7.62×51mm NATO	M60E3 M60E4 M60E6	Standard general purpose machine gun. Several M60E3 being converted by Government Arsenal to M60E4 standard.
	M1919 Browning machine gun	United States	Medium machine gun	.30-06 Springfield	M1919A1	Replaced by M60 machine gun in front line use, relegated for use on vehicles, base defense and security units, and CAFGU units.
	M2 Browning	United States	Heavy machine gun	.50 BMG	M2A1 M2HB	Infantry carried and vehicle mounted.
	M134 Minigun	United States	Rotary machine gun	7.62×51mm NATO	M134	Mounted on armored Humvees and some M113A1 APCs. Some were transferred to the Philippine Air Force in exchange for M39 20 mm cannons.
Grenade launchers
	M203 grenade launcher	United States	Grenade launcher	40 mm grenade	M203 M203A1 LMT LMP300L360	Attached to M4/M4A1 (M203A1) and M16A1 (M203). Additional 740 more units were delivered in March 2011. 2,200 units of LMT-made grenade launchers ordered through US FMS in 2016, of which 425 were delivered in February 2017, 1,100 units delivered in May 2018, and another 675 units delivered before end of 2017.
	M320 Grenade Launcher Module	Germany	Grenade launcher	40 mm grenade	M320 M320 Standalone	Used by Special Operations Command units. Attached to HK416 rifles, some in stand-alone system
	STK 40 AGL	Singapore	Automatic grenade launcher	40 mm grenade	40 AGL	Mounted on Simba 4×4 armored vehicles.
	Rippel Effect XRGL-40	South Africa	Grenade launcher	40 mm grenade	XRGL-40	178 units received in September 2021

== Anti tank weapons ==
Image	Model	Origin	Type	Caliber	Variant	Notes
	RPG-7	Bulgaria Russia China	Rocket-propelled grenade launcher	40mm	Arsenal ATGL-L Bazalt RPG-7V Norinco Type 69	250 ATGL-L2 made by Bulgaria's Arsenal JSCo were delivered starting in 2017 to replace some of the M18 and M67 recoilless rifles in service. 744 units of RPG 7 bought from Russia . 30 units donated by China as military aid.
	Armbrust	Germany; Singapore	Anti-tank weapon	67mm	Armbrust AT	Acquired from Singapore. Used by mechanized infantry units.
	M72 LAW	United States	Anti-tank weapon	66mm	Unknown	In limited service with the Special Operations Command.
	Hispano MPW	Spain	Anti-tank weapon	90mm	Hispano MPW	The Philippine Army has released the Notice of Award in July 2026, favoring Spain's Instalaza S.A., for the Procurement of 54 Medium Multi-purpose Assault Weapon (MMAW) Unguided.
	M67	United States	Recoilless rifle	90mm	M67	186 units in service, used in direct fire support role by infantry units. To be phased out in favor of RPG-7. Many are being mounted on KM-450 light trucks for fire support requirements.
	M40	United States	Recoilless rifle	155mm	M40	In Service.
	BGM-71 TOW	United States	Anti-tank guided missile	153mm	BGM-71H	The Philippine Government received $18 million worth of weapon systems from the United States Government, Total of 100 tube launched optically guided wireless BGM-71 TOW2A Missiles; 12 Improved target acquisition system and support equipment.
	AT-1K Raybolt	Republic of Korea	Anti-tank guided missile	153mm	AT-1K	5 units in service. Public tender was opened in May 2024, SOBE was scheduled on 11 June 2024. South Korea's LIG Nex1 Co. Ltd. was declared the Single Calculated Bidder, with a Notice of Award was released in their favor on 9 October 2024. LIG Nex1 offered the AT-1K Raybolt anti-tank missile system. 20 more on order.

== Communication equipment ==
Image	Model	Origin	Type	Variant	Notes
	Elbit Systems Torch-X	Israel	Battlefield management system	Torch-X	First battlefield management system adopted by Philippine Army. To be installed in light tanks, command and recovery vehicles, and armored personnel carriers ordered in 2020, for delivery by 2021–2022.
	Elbit Systems Combat-NG	Israel	Battlefield fire control and command system	Combat-NG	First computer-based fire control and command system used by the Philippine Army, installed on M-71 155mm towed howitzers, ATMOS 155mm self-propelled howitzers, M113A2 Armored Mortar Carriers, and 24 upgraded M113A2+ FSVs, IFVs, and APCs delivered by Elbit Systems.
	Elbit E-LynX	Israel	Mobile ad-hoc network base and vehicle-mounted radio	MCTR-7200MP-VS50 MCTR-7200HH	MTCR-7200MP is the wideband VHF/UHF Base and Mobile Ad-Hoc Network (MANET) Base & Vehicle-mounted Radio variant, while the MTCR-7200HH is the handheld variant. Base radios acquired under Philippine Army C4ISTAR Project under Horizon 2 phase, ordered by the Philippine Army in September 2020. Upcoming ASCOD 2 and Guarani armored vehicles, ATMOS self-propelled howitzers, and M113A2 120mm armored mortar carriers will also be equipped with the vehicle-mounted variant. Expected to be the future standard combat radio system of strategic land units.
	Harris RF-7800 Falcon III	United States	Base/Vehicle mounted combat-net radio Vehicle mounted intercom Manpack combat-net radio Hand-held combat-net radio	RF-7800V-V51X RF-7800I RF-7800V-MP RF-7800V-HH	Wideband HF/VHF Base and Vehicle-mounted Radio, including a vehicle internal intercom system. Ordered in 2014 and introduced in 2016, with 263 units for base and vehicle deployment delivered as part of a deal worth $18 million. Another 60 units were ordered in 2017. Installed on command and armored vehicles of the MID. The RF-7800V-MP Wideband HF/VHF Manpack Radio was introduced in 2014 with 272 units delivered, plus 248 units delivered in 2015 as part of a deal worth $18 million. Another 150 units ordered in 2017 under US Foreign Military Sales (FMS) program as part of the Horizon 1 phase. The RF-7800V-HH was introduced in 2015 with 1,376 units delivered as part of a deal worth $18 million. Another 3,185 units acquired under 2nd List of Horizon 1 phase.
	Harris RF-5800 Falcon II	United States	Base combat-net radio Manpack combat-net radio Hand-held combat-net radio	RF-5800H RF-5800H-MP RF-5800V-HH	The RF-5800H Wideband HF Base Radio was first introduced in 2008. The RF-5800H-MP is a standard High Frequency manpack radio of the Philippine Army, with 325 units introduced in 2004. Another 234 units received in 2005, and 2,019 additional units were delivered in 2008. More received in 2011, The RF-5800V-HH is a handheld VHF radio, with 1,956 units introduced in 2005 and another 4,501 units delivered in 2008.
	Motorola APX P25	United States	Base digital mobile radio Hand-held digital mobile radio	APX 6500 SRX 2200	UHF base and handheld digital radios, using P25 technology optimized for public safety. The APX 6500 series include base/vehicle and handheld radios. The SRX 2200 is a military handheld variant for use as intra-squad radio, with more than 5,000 units scheduled for delivery under the Philippine Army's C4ISTAR - Hand Held Radio Project under Horizon 2 phase of RAFPMP.
	Inrico T320	China	Hand-held Push-to-talk over cellular radio	T320 4G LTE	Handheld Push-to-talk over Cellular (PoC) radio, used by Special Forces Regiment (Airborne) for dispatching and special task execution.
	Inrico T199	China	Hand-held Push-to-talk over cellular radio	T199 3G	Handheld Push-to-talk over Cellular (PoC) radio, used by Special Forces Regiment (Airborne) for dispatching and special task execution.
	Motorola GM338	United States	Base analog mobile radio	GM338	Analog base radios used for conventional communications.
	Motorola CP1660	United States	Hand-held analog mobile radio	CP1660	Handheld analog radios used for conventional communications.
	Entel HT700	United Kingdom	Hand-held analog two-way radio	HT712 HT722	Handheld analog two-way radios used for conventional communications.
	MLX Series Manpack Loudspeakers	Philippines	Loudspeaker	MLX-6 MLX-5 MLX-4	Made by the Civil Military Operations Group of the Philippine Army.

== Night-fighting equipment ==
Image	Model	Origin	Type	Variant	Notes
	Insight Technology AN/PVS-14	United States	Monocular night-vision device	Nightline M914; Noctis C1400	Several units provided by US government, or procured in small numbers. 2,351 units received in 2010, delivered by Nightline Inc. Several thousand more units ordered, or being tendered by the Philippine Army in 2018 up to 2021 as part of their annual procurement programs. Filipino company United Defense Manufacturing Corp. supplied 127 + 55 units of Noctis C1400 night vision monoculars in 2023.
	L3 Technologies AN/PVS-7	United States	Binocular night-vision device	AN/PVS-7	Used by troops of the Special Operations Command.
	Aselsan A100	Turkey	Monocular night-vision device	A100	4,464 initially ordered from Aselsan A.S, 2,808 units more ordered using balance of budget for the project.
	MKU Netro NM-3000	India	Monocular night-vision device	NM-3000	661 units ordered by the Philippine Army in 2021, expected delivery by 2022.
	AN/PEQ-15	United States	Laser sight	-	2,351 units received in two batches in 2008 and 2011. Used by troops of the Special Operations Command.
	Aselsan Infrared Aiming Device	Turkey	Target pointer/Illuminator	Infrared Aiming Device	4,464 initially ordered from Aselsan A.S under the Night Fighting System project, matched together with the Aselsan A100 Monocular NV Device. 2,808 units more ordered using balance of budget for the project.
	Beamshot Trizm Multipurpose Infrared Aiming Device	United States	Infrared Aiming Device	Trizm G	Used by soldiers of the Special Operations Command, Primarily the Light Reaction Regiment.
	Elbit Systems CORAL	Israel	Long Range Thermal Imager / IR target designator	CORAL-CR	

== Combat Engineering equipment ==
Image	Model	Origin	Type	Variant	Notes
	Gill DSP-27 Goldie	United Kingdom	Handheld Mine Detector	DSP-27	Provided as part of US Military Assistance. Used for counter-IED operations.
	CEIA CMD	United Kingdom	Handheld Mine Detector	CMD V1 CMD V2	104 units CMD V2s were delivered under Combat Engineering Equipment Lot 7 - Mini Mine Detector Project under Horizon 2.
	Schiebel MIMID	Austria	Mini Mine Detector	MIMID	
	M1	United States	Bangalore torpedo	M1A2 M1A3	Used by Combat Engineering units for breaching operations

== Acquisition programs ==
The Philippine Army has embarked on a 3-phase modernization program starting from 2013 to 2028 under the Revised AFP Modernization Program (RAFPMP) covered by Republic Act 10349, while still completing a previous modernization program spanning from 1995 to 2012 under the AFP Modernization Program (AFPMP) covered by Republic Act 7898. Several new acquisitions found in the current inventory were acquired under the AFP Modernization Program, as the Army projects under the RAFPMP are yet to be implemented as of September 2015.

=== Infantry and crew-served weapons ===
In line with the Philippine Army's requirement to acquire additional rifles to meet its growing needs, the branch of service conducted the acquisition of additional 2,702 new rifles in 5.56×45mm NATO caliber under the Assault Rifle M4/AR15 Platform Acquisition Project in which deliveries started in October 2019 and would end in February 2020.

The Government Arsenal is being tapped to refurbish or rebuild a majority of the Army's M16A1 rifles, and prototypes were already made to convert them to several variants.

Aside from the M16A1, the Government Arsenal will also be refurbishing or rebuilding the existing M14 battle rifles of the AFP, into either the M14 SOCOM 16 battle rifle similar to the Springfield Armory M1A SOCOM 16 rifle, the M14 Designated Marksman Rifle (DMR) which similar to the US Marine Corps' Designated Marksman Rifle; and to the Enhanced Battle Rifle (EBR) which is similar to the US Navy's Mk 14 Enhanced Battle Rifle.

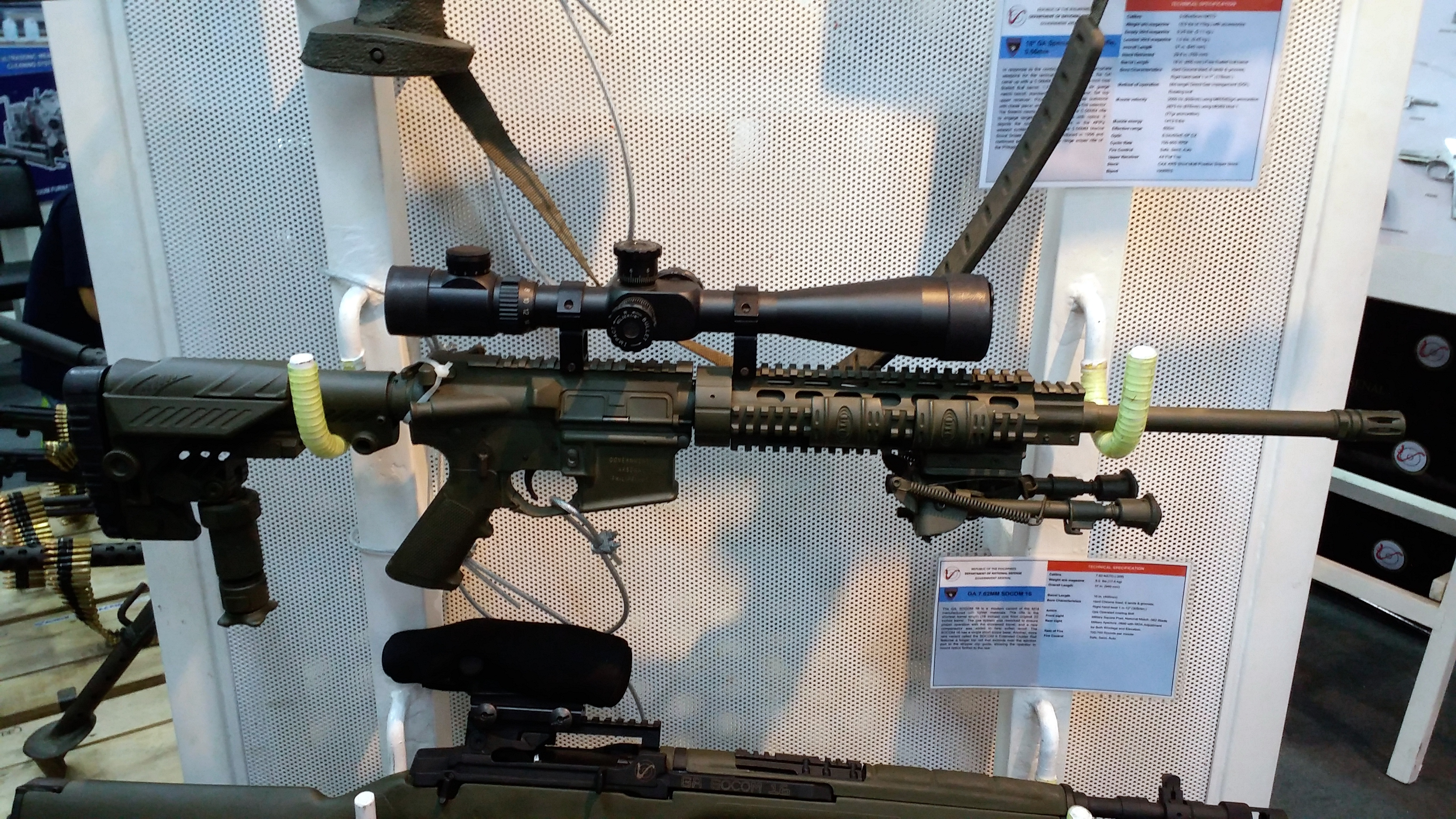
GA's Designated Marksman Rifle/Special Purpose Rifle (DMR/SPR) with an 18" barrel and optics

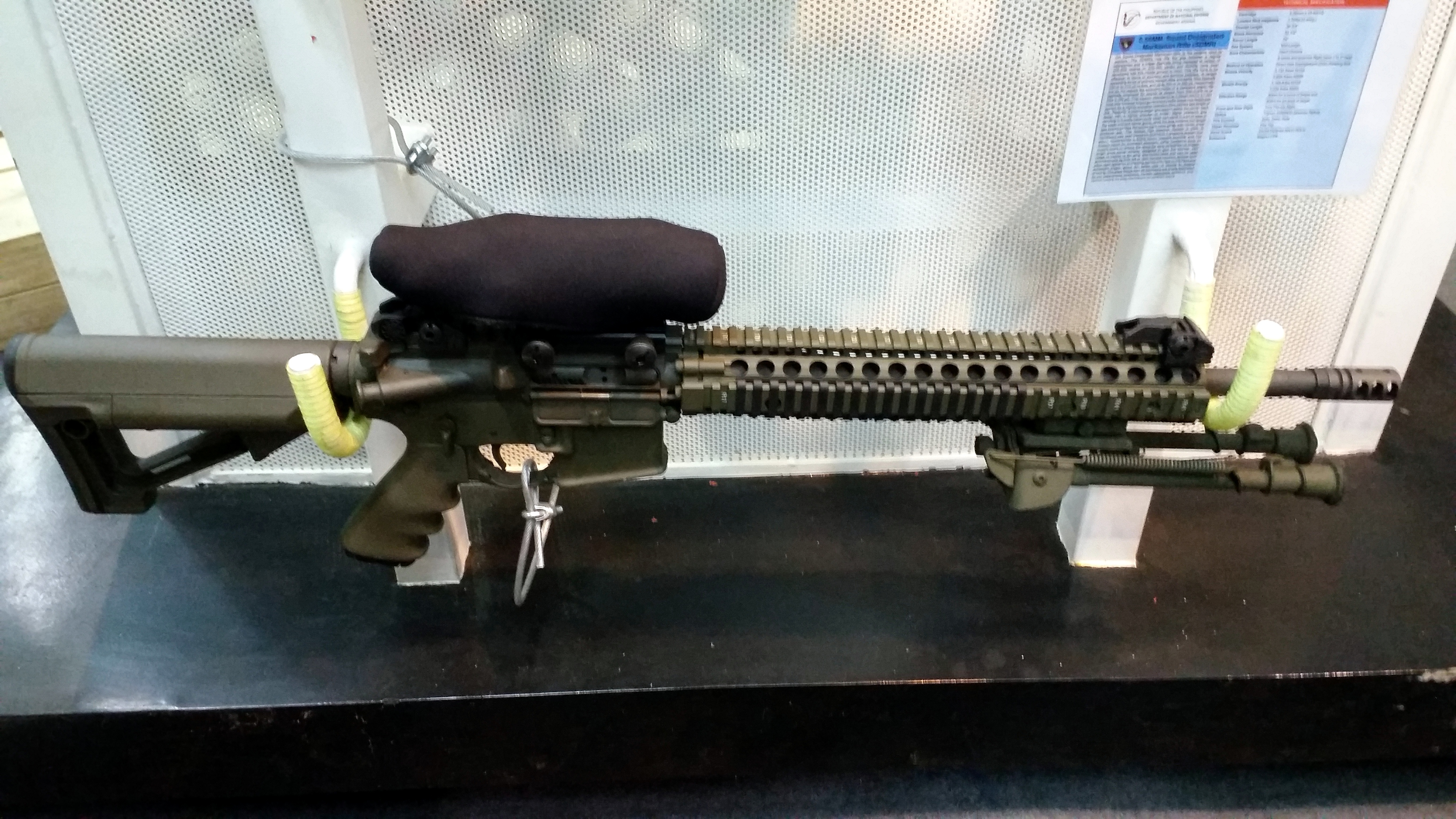
GA's Squad Designated Marksman Rifle (SDMR) for SOCOM units, with a 16" barrel and optics.

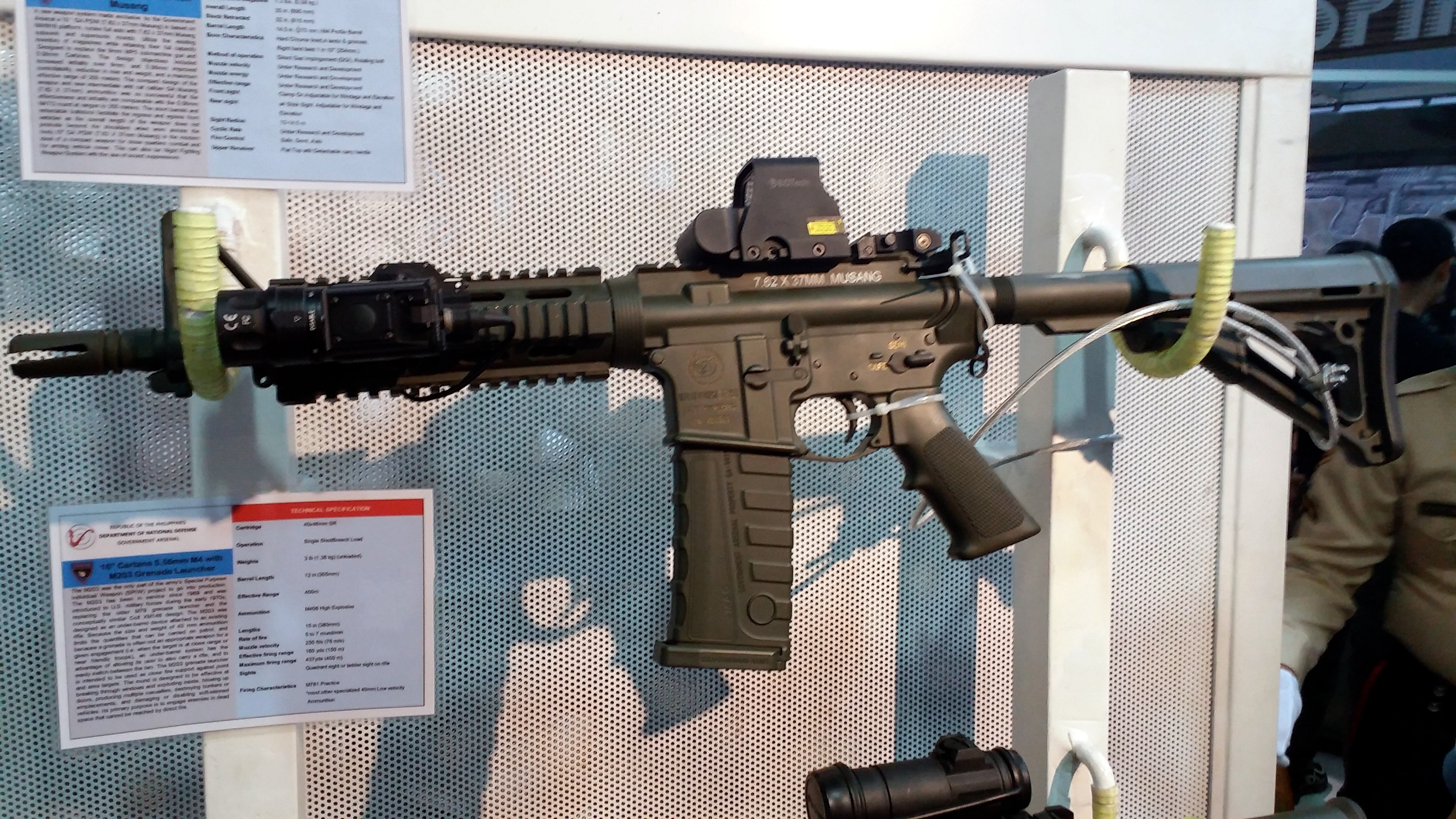
GA's Musang Personal Defense Weapon (PDW) with a 10" barrel chambered to fire the 7.62×37mm Musang round developed by GA.

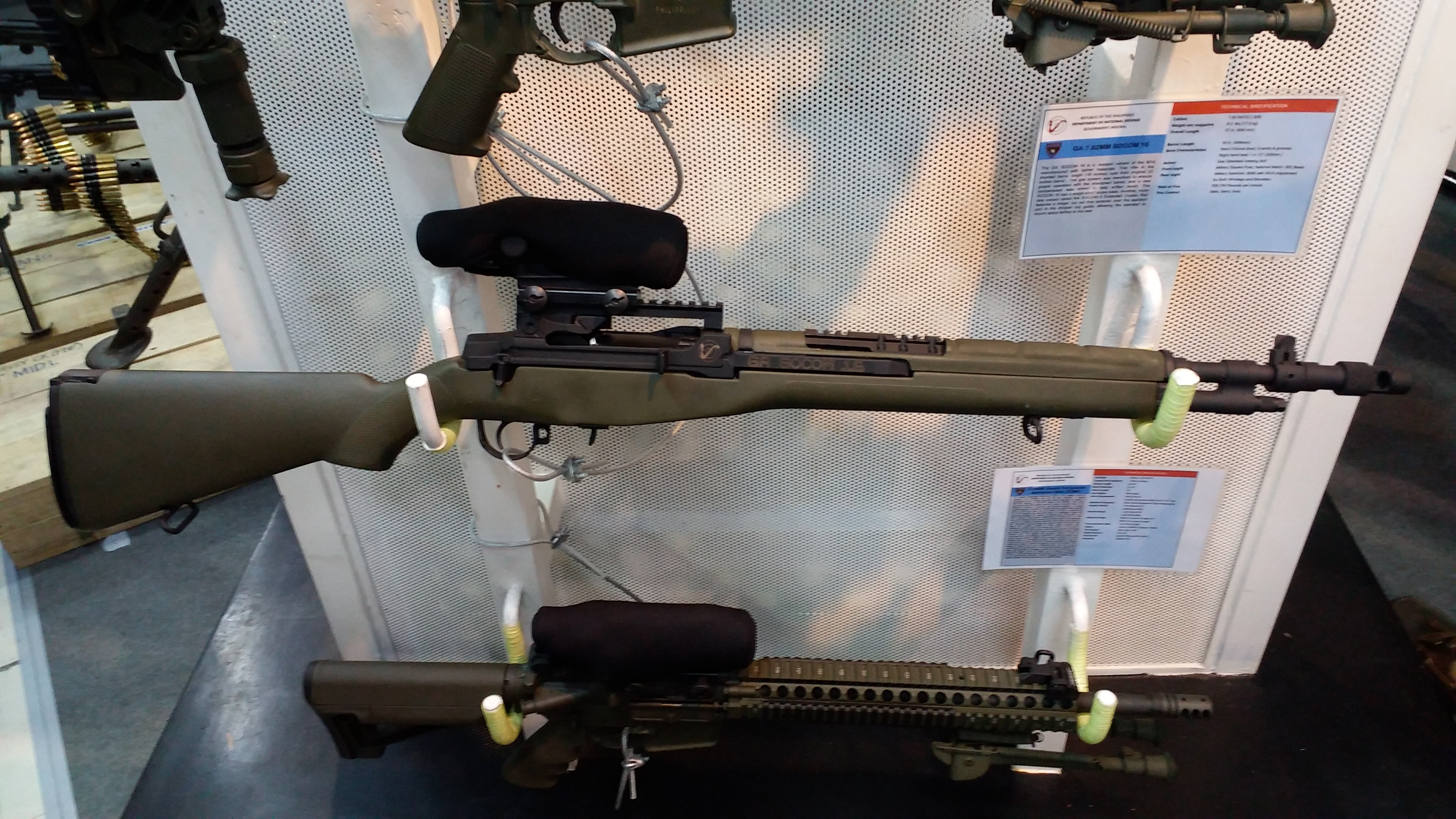
GA's SOCOM 16 rifle, an upgraded M14 using a 16" barrel for SOCOM units.

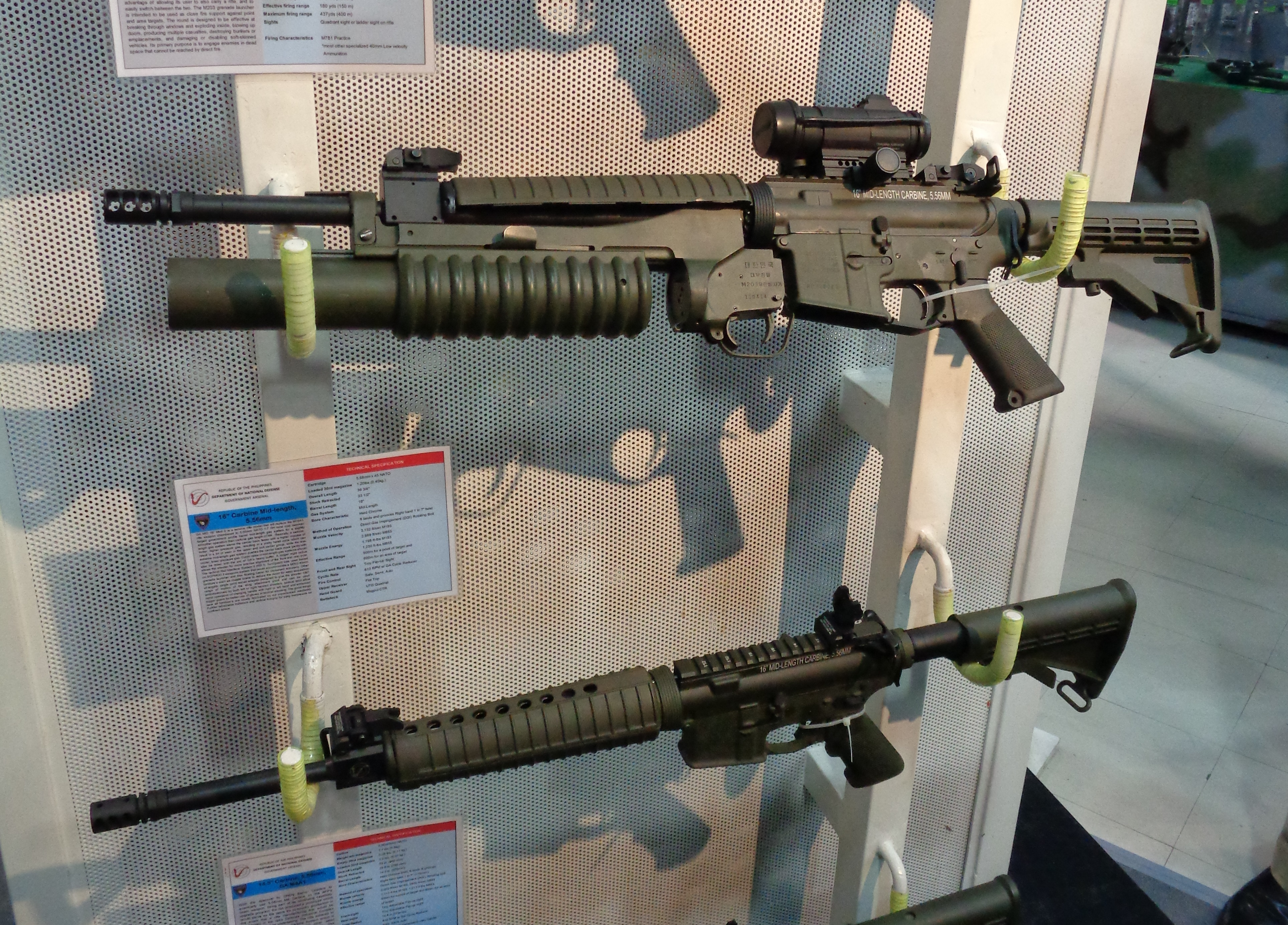
M16A1s refurbished and upgraded by Government Arsenal.

=== Light tanks ===
To provide a starting point for the Philippine Army's goal of re-establishing its lost armored / tank capabilities, the Armor Division has proposed the acquisition of Light or Medium Tanks to enable them to re-learn the operation and use of tanks in different combat situations. They originally requested 144 Light Tanks for the Horizon 2 phase of AFP Modernization.

Elbit Systems won the Light Tank Acquisition Project, with the Notice of Award (NOA) issued by the Department of National Defense in September 2020. The Army will receive Sabrah Light Tanks consisting of 18 tracked version and 10 wheeled version. These will be armed with a new 105 mm gun developed by Elbit in partnership with Denel Land Systems. Also included in the package is 1 tracked armored command vehicle and 1 tracked armored recovery vehicle.

The Philippine Army is also studying an offer from the Japanese Ministry of Defense for the possible donation of the Type 74 main battle tank. Negotiations for similar developments are currently ongoing, yet little is known within the planned offer.

=== APC acquisition and upgrade program ===
The Philippine Army has been considering the upgrade of several dozens of Simba and V-150 4x4 armored vehicles. However, due to budget difficulties, it has to choose which projects to prioritize. To improve the mobility of the Armor Division, as well as introduce a new model to complement and eventually replace ageing assets, the Philippine Army submitted a request for the acquisition of a new fleet of wheeled Armoured Personnel Carriers (APC). They originally requested 114 APCs for the Horizon 2 phase of AFP Modernization.

In October 2020, the Notice of Award for the Wheeled Armored Personnel Carrier Acquisition Project was issued to Elbit Systems which offered 28 units of IVECO Guarani 6x6 armored vehicle.

There was a previous report from Thailand where in it was mentioned that the Thai government is nearing a G2G agreement with the Philippines to supply 200 units of First Win 2 4x4 wheeled armored vehicle to the Philippine Army to resist ambush tactics, IED explosions, and landmines.

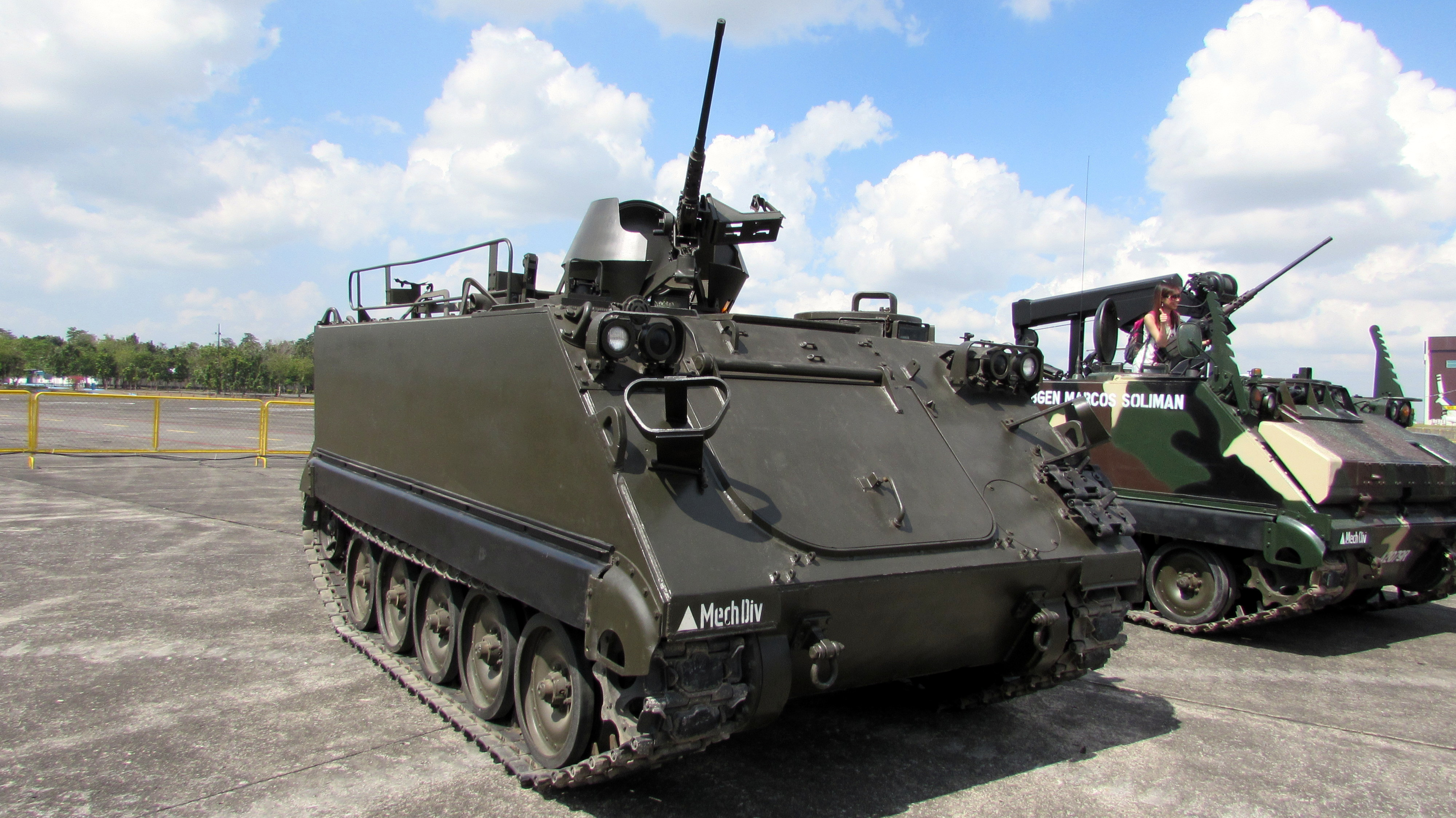
One of the 114 M113A2 armoured personnel carrier received from the US government's EDA program.

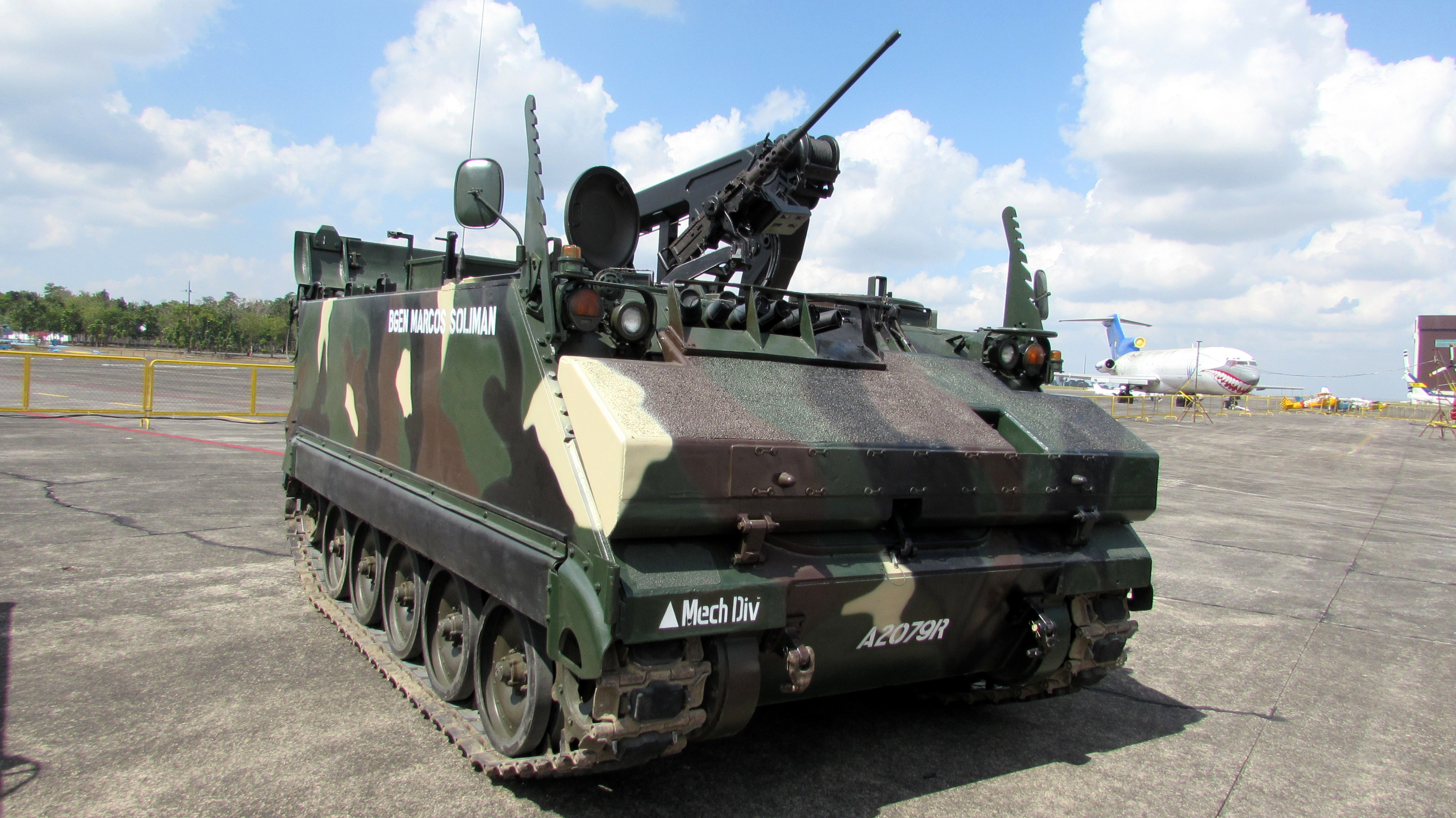
One of the four Belgian-made M113A2+ armoured recovery vehicle acquired by the Philippine Army from Elbit Systems Land & C4I of Israel.

=== Armored vehicle-launched bridge ===
The Philippine Army awarded Elbit Systems for the acquisition of the M1074 Joint Assault Bridge. Two units of AVLBs based on the Merkava IV chassis were delivered in July 2022.

=== Land-based missile system ===
The Philippine Army is in the process of acquiring its first long-range missile systems to allow it to engage targets beyond the country's shore against enemy warships, or depending on the missiles available, to strike land targets. Its objective is to provide the Philippine Army a long range tactical capability to defend the country from foreign naval threats especially those directly threatening the Philippine mainland. The missile system will be operated by the Army Artillery Regiment.

The Land Based Missile System (LBMS) Acquisition Project is a Horizon 2 phase Priority Project under the Revised AFP Modernization Program. It is the successor to the cancelled Shore Based Missile System (SBMS) Acquisition Project back in 2015.

In 2018, the plan was part of the ₱300 billion PHP (US$5.6 billion) Horizon 2 phase projects, with the budget for the Land-Based Missile System approved. However, no order was made due to consideration of US made Typhoon missile system. The BrahMos Missile Systems from India being the main contender for the project where at least 3 batteries set to be acquired. The project was delayed due to the pandemic.

As of August 2026, a purchase of up to 9 BrahMos batteries is anticipated.

=== 155mm Self propelled howitzer systems ===
The 155mm self propelled howitzer (SPH) system procurement project aims to procure a total of 12 new self propelled howitzers, which also includes an integrated logistics support (ILS) package and a variety of modern munitions such as precision guided munitions (PGMs). The program also proposed to create a 2nd field artillery battalion equipped with the 155mm self propelled howitzers, and to further increase the total of SPHs in the army's service, following the success of the 1st Field Artillery Battalion and the versatility of the SPHs in modern warfare in scoot and shoot operations. The primary contender for the project was the ATMOS 2000 from Israel for commonality in key areas such as training, exercise, and improved interoperability. The ATMOS was eventually ruled out of the options by the Department of National Defense (DND) as the Israeli Government has ordered its defense contractors to prioritize the production of munitions and weapons for the Gaza war, which caused delayed deliveries to some of the Army's projects, including the Sabrah light tanks and the Guarani APCs, and forcing the DND to look for other alternative systems from other countries.

The primary contenders for the program include the CAESAR self-propelled howitzer and the DITA.

=== Multiple-launch rocket system ===
South Korea offered four batteries of retired K136 Kooryong multiple-launch rocket system (MLRS), related equipment and ammunitions to the AFP. Of the four batteries, three would go to the Philippine Army. One battery can consist of between four and six firing units. The delay is due to the non-released funds for its shipment from South Korea to the Philippines. In July 2022, various reports indicated that the Philippine Army will no longer pursue the acquisition of the Kooryongs and favored the acquisition of newer and more modern systems.

The Philippine Army also laid out plans to acquire long range rocket artillery systems, such as the K239 Chunmoo from South Korea and the PULS from Israel, as part of the Horizon 3 of the Modernization Program. Both systems were preferred over the M142 HIMARS rocket systems due to high costs, although the said US-made MLRS are also being considered by the Philippine Army in a separate acquisition program. The acquisition also covers proposals to acquire long-range surface-to-surface missiles such as the CTM290 and Tactical ballistic missiles, such as the Ure tactical ballistic missile and the Precision Strike Missile for long range island defense operations. On 25 August 2025, the army is entering early stage discussions with the Indian Army about the potential acquisition of the Pralay ballistic missile.

=== Anti-tank missile system ===
During the 2023 Balikatan Exercises, the Philippine Army expressed plans for the acquisition of the FGM-148 Javelin, as test run exercises for firing the missile system were conducted during the exercises. The Philippine Army also noted the missile system's performance during the Russo-Ukrainian War and could potentially serve as one of the key backbones of the Army's focus towards the shift to external defense. Other potential candidates include the AT-1K Raybolt and the Spike MR, while also drawing interest to procure the M4 Carl Gustaf recoilless rifle. On 11 November 2024, the Army released a notice of award to procure the AT-1K Raybolt system in limited numbers to be used for evaluation purposes. 20 more units are were also additionally procured and are set to be delivered in 2027. The Philippine Army has also procured 54 units of the Instalaza HISPANO Multipurpose Weapon (MPW) on July 2026 for P290.92 million ($17 million), and is also set to gradually replace the M67 recoilless rifle.

=== Aircraft ===
In October 2019, the Philippine Army activated its aviation regiment. In addition, the Philippine Army is planning to buy helicopters in the next few years to be used by its sole flying unit, which currently has fixed-wing aircraft for special aviation missions. The Army is also in talks with Boeing Rotorcraft Systems for the possible acquisition of the Boeing AH-6I light attack helicopters.

In December 2022, the Japan Ground Self Defense Force laid out plans to donate their Bell UH-1J Helicopters to the Philippine Army. Plans were also being laid out to place the helicopters under a grant from the Japanese Ministry of Defense.

=== Short-ranged air-defense (SHORAD) systems ===
Aside from the current M39 cannons and other AA guns used by field units, the Army has a limited number of Man-Portable Air-Defense Systems (MANPADS) in its inventory including the MBDA Mistral and FIM-92 Stinger in limited numbers which operated by the Presidential Security Command. With the activation of 1st and 2nd Air Defense Artillery Battery in 2019 and 2020 respectively, the Army is preparing to acquire Man-Portable Air-Defense Systems (MANPADS), as part of the Horizon 2 projects. They are eyeing the MBDA Mistral system from France, and the LIG Nex1 Chiron system from South Korea.

=== Gun-based air-defense and medium-ranged air-defense systems ===
Plans are also being laid out for the procurement of a gun-based air-defense systems, and medium-ranged air-defense systems, wherein both are part of the Horizon 3 phase of the AFP Modernization Program. Under the medium-ranged air-defense system acquisition program, the main contenders for the program are the SPYDER MR, the IRIS-T SLM, and the NASAMS.

=== Communications equipment ===
The DND awarded an US$18 million contract to Harris Corporation to supply Harris Falcon III tactical vehicular radios and intercom systems for the Philippine Army's Mechanized Infantry Division (formerly the Light Armor Division). The contract required RF-7800V Combat Net Radios and RF-7800I Intercom Systems to be installed of the MID's armored and support vehicles.

The Philippine Army also acquired additional Falcon-series tactical radios from Harris under a FMS deal with the US government, with a requirement for 62 100W base radios, 520 20W man-pack radios, and 1,376 5W hand-held radios under the AFPMP RA 7898 already awarded in 2014. Another set of orders was slated under RAFPMP RA 10349, with an additional 60 units 50W HF vehicular radios and 1,446 5W hand-held radios.

== See also ==
- List of equipment of the Philippine Air Force
- List of equipment of the Philippine Navy
- List of equipment of the Philippine Marine Corps
