= List of equipment of the Philippine Marine Corps =

This is a list of equipment used by the Philippine Marine Corps, a unit under the Philippine Navy that specializes in amphibious warfare. The marine corps has made use of its existing equipment conduct its operations while modernization projects are underway. The Republic Act No. 7898 declares the policy of the State to modernize the military to a level where it can effectively and fully perform its constitutional mandate to uphold the sovereignty and preserve the patrimony of the republic. The law, as amended, has set conditions that should be satisfied when the defense department procures major equipment and weapon systems for the marine corps.

== Armored vehicles ==
Picture	Model	Origin	Type	Variant	In Service	Notes
	AAV7A1	Republic of Korea; United States	Amphibious Amphibious Assault Vehicle	KAAV7A1	8	Produced by Hanwha Systems for the Amphibious vehicle requirement.
	Chaiseri AWAV	Thailand	Amphibious Assault Vehicle	AWAV APC	(+5)	5 on order for Peacekeeping Operations Battalion.
	LAV-300	United States	Armored personnel carrier & Fire Support Vehicle	V-300 APC V-300 FSV	12 11	Introduced in early 90s. 23 in service as of 2012, 1 FSV destroyed in enemy action.
	Commando	United States	Armoured personnel carrier	V-150	18	Delivery starting 1975, at least 18 known in service and 12 refurbished in 2007.
	Kia KLTV	Republic of Korea	Armored Tactical Vehicle	K153	1	Donated by Kia Motors for evaluation for future Light Tactical Vehicle requirement. Currently used for convoy escort duties. 1 transferred from the Philippine Army.
	Kovico KMPV	Republic of Korea	Light armored vehicle Armored field ambulance	KMPV APC KMPV Armored Ambulance	6 1	Acquired under the GMRS-PMC-PNBAC2-2024-10 Jeep (4x4) and APC Wheeled Ambulance/Rescue Vehicle Acquisition Project. 7 units delivered in September 2026, composed of 6 APCs and 1 Armored Ambulance. The APCs will be armed with Mertsav's MMG762 7.62mm machine gun which were acquired separately under GMRS-PKOBn-PMCBAC-2024-04 - Weapon for Jeep 4x4 Acquisition Project.
	CS/VP3 MRAP	China	MRAP	CS/VP3	1	Part of donation from China, 1 unit confirmed transferred from the Philippine Army.

== Utility vehicles ==
Picture	Model	Origin	Type	Variant	In Service	Notes
	AM General HMMWV	United States	Light Utility Vehicle	M998A1 M1038A1 M1025A1	unknown	Divided into several variants and series
	Maxi-Ambulance	United States	Light Utility Vehicle	M1152	4	23 delivered to AFP in November 2011, PMC received 4 units.
	URO VAMTAC	Spain	Armored ambulance	ST5	2	2 delivered to PMC in September 2026
	Marine Multi-purpose Vehicle	Philippines	1/2-ton Light Utility Vehicle	MMPV	8	A 4x4 prototype utility vehicle used and manufactured by the PMC. The vehicle is rumored to be a heavily refurbished Mitsubishi Pajero while having a similar concept of the HMMWV. Tests were conducted within 2005–2006. 8 units were produced, while some units are equipped with the M40 recoilless rifle.
	Delta Mini Cruiser	Philippines	1/4-ton Light Utility Vehicle	M1777	unknown	Divided into several variants and series, including short and stretched utility and armed variants, and modified variants for specialized units.
	M151	United States	1/4-ton Light Utility Vehicle and Weapons Carrier	Standard	–	In Service, several carrying M40 106 mm recoilless rifle.
	Kia KM45 Series	Republic of Korea	1 1/2-ton Utility Vehicle Field Ambulance	KM450 KM451	<50 12	651 purchased by AFP on 2007, 61 units shared by Navy/Marines and Air Force 60 km-451 field ambulance purchased by AFP in 2012, 12 assigned to the Marines.
	Freightliner M2	United States	Utility Truck	M2 106 Crew Cab	6	Hauler for Riverine Patrol Boat trailer, each with RPB trailer.
	URO TTURO 4WD	Spain	3-ton Utility Vehicle	TTURO Cargo Troop Carrier Water Tanker	unknown	Delivered 3rd quarter 2026 to fill requirement for UN Peacekeeping Operations. Divided into several variants
	M35 Truck	United States	2 1/2-ton Utility Vehicle	M35	–	Divided into several variants and series. More delivered in 2013.
	Kia KM25 Series	Republic of Korea	2 1/2-ton Utility Vehicle	KM250	–Several dozens	Several dozens received in multiple batches acquired by the Philippine Navy and the Armed Forces of the Philippines.
	M939 truck	United States	Heavy Utility Vehicle	M923	–	Several delivered to AFP in 2013, several units for the Marines.
	Kia KM50 Series	Republic of Korea	5-ton Utility Vehicle	KM500	6	155mm Artillery prime mover, 6 units delivered in 2012.
	Mack Defense Granite	United States	Heavy Utility Truck	Granite 4x4 Tractor	8	Tank transporter tractor for AAVs.
	LARC-V	United States	Amphibious Support Vehicle	LARC-V	5	Most refurbished in 2006.

== Artillery ==
Picture	Model	Origin	Type	Variant	In Service	Notes
Mortar
	RSG60	Spain	60 mm Mortar	RSG60	(+240)	Manufactured by Rheinmetall Expal Systems S.A., deal being finalized in early 2026 as part of the RAFPMP Horizon 2 phase.
	M75 mortar	Philippines	60 mm Mortar	M75	unknown	Several hundred units were produced as part of the AFP Self-Reliance Defense Posture Program starting 1977, several distributed for the PMC. To be retired upon delivery of new RSG60 lightweight combi mortar system.
	81-PTH1 mortar	Turkey	81 mm Mortar	81-PTH1	(+6)	Manufactured by TG Defense, deal being finalized in early 2026.
	81-MX2-KM mortar	Spain	81 mm Mortar	81-MX2-KM	30	Manufactured by Expal Systems S.A., ordered as part of the RAFPMP Horizon 2 phase, in service from late 2022.
	M29 mortar	United States	81 mm Mortar	M29	unknown	In service.
	120-MX2-SM	Spain	120 mm Mortar	120-MX2-SM	8	Manufactured by Rheinmetall Expal Systems S.A., delivered in 2024 as part of the RAFPMP Horizon 2 phase.
Field Artillery
	Soltam M-71	Israel	155 mm Towed Howitzer	M-71	6	First batch delivered April 2017. Second batch delivered June 2017. In service.
	M101	United States	105 mm Towed Howitzer	M101	~23	Total 150 delivered to the AFP, majority with the Army. Delivered in 1957–1958.
	Mod 56	Italy	105 mm Towed Howitzer	Mod 56	~20	Total 120 delivered to AFP, majority went to the Army. Delivered in 1983.

== Missiles ==
Picture	Model	Origin	Type	Quantity	Notes
Brahmos missile system	BrahMos	India	Anti-ship cruise missile system	2 Missile Batteries (+1)	Operated by the Coastal Defense Regiment. The contract was signed on 28 January 2022. Delivery was scheduled by December 2023 but was moved until early 2024. The first and second batteries were delivered in April 2024 and April 2025, respectively, while the third and final battery is being delivered as of August 2026.

== Aircraft ==
Picture	Model	Origin	Type	Variant	In Service	Notes
	AeroVironment RQ-20 Puma	United States	Miniature UAV	RQ-20A Puma AE	2 systems	Initial 2 systems with 4 drones and 2 ground stations each, delivered through US military assistance in 2021, with possibly more to follow.
	AeroVironment RQ-11 Raven	United States	Miniature UAV	RQ-11B	1 system	Initial 1 system with 3 drones delivered on January 27, 2017, with possibly more to follow.
	MAG Aerospace Super Swiper II	United States	Small UAV	Super Swiper II	6 system	Acquired under the Marine Forces Imaging and Targeting Support System (MITSS) project. Delivered starting 2017.
		Philippines	Loitering munition		(+ several systems)	Notice of Award (NOA) for the Supply of Materials for the Procurement of Vertical Take-off and Landing Precision Strike Munitions was released on 17 January 2025, to be assembled by the PMC. The project with an Approved Budget of Contract (ABC) of Php100 million was priced by Thunder Defense for Php88,000,080.00. Several systems on order.

== Watercraft ==
Picture	Model	Origin	Type	Variant	In Service	Notes
	Riverine Patrol Boat	United States	Small unit riverine craft	40' x 10'8" SURC	6	Similar, but larger version of the SURC used by the US Marines produced by Silver Ships Inc., purchased under FMS worth $6.5 million and introduced in September 2013
	Combat Rubber Raiding Craft	United States	Combat Rubber Raiding Craft	CRRC	>25	Similar to the CRRC used by the US Marines produced by Zodiac Marine. 25 units were handed over by the US military in June 2017 Prior to that several more already in service with PMC from previous acquisitions.
	Patrol Craft Coastal (PCC)	Philippines	Special Operations Craft	SOC	+16	Similar, longer, but less gunned SOC-R used by the US Marines, being built locally and for delivery by 2019. For use by the Marine Special Operations Group (MARSOG)
	MARTAC Devil Ray T38	United States	Medium USV	USV	Unknown	US Ambassador to the Philippines Lee Lipton confirmed that the Philippine Marine Corps received their own Martac Systems T38 Devil Ray unmanned surface vessel from the US Government.

== Infantry Gear ==
Photo	Model	Origin	Type	Variant	Notes
Combat uniform
	Phlippine Marine Pattern (PHILMARPAT)	Philippines	Camouflaged combat uniform	Philippine Marine Pattern	Standard issue uniform from 2011, replacing previous woodland-style pattern.
Combat helmet
	Marom Dolphin Tactical Helmet	Israel	Combat helmet	Tactical Helmet - High Cut	More than 9,000 units acquired by the PMC as part of the Marom Dolphin Fusion System and acquired in 2020, and delivery starting 2022. Current main combat helmet of marine battalion landing teams.
	Full Assault Shell Technology (FAST)	United States United States	Combat helmet	Ops-Core FAST Team Wendy EXFIL	Mostly provided as part of US Military Assistance. Used by MARSOG.
	PASGT	United States	Combat helmet		Previous standard issue helmet, replaced by Marom Dolphin Tactical Helmets, now being used by secondary units.
	CVCH	United States	Combat helmet		Standard Issue Crewman Helmet for armored vehicle crewmen.
Load-bearing vest, Bulletproof vest & Plate carrier
	Marom Dolphin Fusion System	Israel}	Integrated carrying system	Marom Fusion System	Current system used by frontline PMC units. Integrated carrying system that includes plate carrier body armor, tactical duty belt, and backpack. Body armor with Level III and IV protection.
	Scalable Plate Carrier	United States Philippines	Chest rig plate carrier body armor		Combination of US-supplied and Philippine and foreign-made copies. The PMC's standard Plate Carrier System have Level III and Level IV protection.
	All-purpose lightweight individual carrying equipment (ALICE)	United States	Load-bearing equipment		Donated by the United States Government, as surplus nor procurement processes undertaken by the Philippine Department of Defense. Used by training units.

== Infantry weapons ==
Picture	Model	Origin	Type	Caliber	Variant	In Service	Notes
Pistol
	M1911 pistol	United States; Philippines	Semi-automatic pistol	.45 ACP	M1911	unknown	Standard issue sidearm, mostly issued to officers. Majority are former EDA US Army stocks made by Colt, Springfield Armory, and Remington. Being replaced by TAC Ultra FS HC and Glock 17 Gen 4 as standard sidearm of the Philippine Army. Some pistols refurbished and upgraded by Government Arsenal.
	Rock Island Armory 1911 series	Philippines	Semi-automatic pistol	.45 ACP	TAC Ultra FS HC 45 ACP	unknown (+5,000)	3,000 acquired by Armed Forces of the Philippines in 2017, for issue to all service branches. Majority went to the Philippine Army. AFP ordered 60,000 units under AFP 0.45 caliber Hammer Fired Pistol acquisition project, around 5,000 units expected to go to Philippine Marines.
	Glock 21	United States	Semi-automatic pistol	.45 ACP	G21 SF	200+	Provided as a US government grant for MARSOG, delivery by June 2017.
	Glock 17	Austria	Semi-automatic pistol	9×19mm Parabellum	Glock 17 Gen 4	– (+5,000)	Contract awarded to Glock Asia Pacific in September 2017 to supply 5,000 units to be issued to the Philippine Marines.
Submachine gun
	Heckler & Koch MP5	Germany	Submachine gun	9×19mm	MP5A3 MP5A5	unknown	Issued to Force Reconnaissance Battalion.
Assault rifles, Battle rifles
	M16 rifle	United States; Philippines	Assault rifle	5.56×45mm	A1 A1 (enhanced) A1 Dissipator A2	unknown	Manufactured by Colt USA and Elisco Tool Philippines. Government Arsenal refurbished M16A1-standard rifles to M16A1 (enhanced). Replaced by M4A1 carbine as standard-issue rifle
	PVAR rifle	Philippines	Assault rifle	5.56×45mm NATO	PVAR	Unknown	A variant of the Armalite AR-15 and M16 rifle, using a Pneumatic Valve and Rod system. Used by the Special Operations Command.
	Night Fighting Weapons System	Philippines	Assault rifle	5.56×45mm	NFWS	unknown	Introduced in 2004, developed by the PMC based on M16A1 rifle after experiences in the MSSR. Used by MARSOG.
	M4/M4A1	United States	Assault rifle, Carbine	5.56×45mm	Colt M4 & M4A1 Remington R4A3	unknown ~7,412	Standard service rifle. Initial batch of 6,443 Remington R4A3 ordered for the PMC by the AFP. Residual order of 969 additional units. Colt M4s in service with MARSOG.
	Dasan DSAR	Republic of Korea	Assault rifle, Carbine	5.56×45mm NATO	DSAR-15	1,420	South Korea's Dasan Machineries was awarded a contract for 1,420 rifles in 2025.
	LMT Mk.18 CQBR	United States	Assault rifle, Carbine	5.56×45mm	Mk.18 Mod.0	unknown	Granted by the US government, delivered in June 2017. In service with Force Reconnaissance Group.
	LMT CQB	United States	Assault rifle, Carbine	5.56×45mm	CQB14.5 5.56	300	Granted by the US government, delivered in June 2017. Used by MARSOG. Similar to New Zealand Defence Force's MARS-L rifle.
	Heckler & Koch HK416	Germany	Assault rifle	5.56×45mm	D10RS D14.5RS	unknown	Used by MARSOG. most of the time equipped with ANPEQ-2 and a red dot sight with a M320.
	CAR-15	United States	Assault rifle, Carbine	5.56×45mm	M653 M653P	unknown	Used by MARSOG.
	SR 88	Singapore	Assault rifle, Carbine	5.56×45mm	SR88A	10	Donated by Bangko Sentral ng Pilipinas to Philippine Marine Corps. Formerly from the inventory of the BSP's Security Services Department. Initial transfer of 10 units as rifles are phased out of BSP inventory.
	M14 rifle	United States	Battle rifle / designated marksman rifle	7.62×51mm	M14	unknown	Standard battle rifle, several were installed with optics and used as designated marksman rifles.
	M1 Garand	United States	Semi-automatic rifle	.30-06 Springfield	M1	unknown	Used for ceremonial purposes. Others distributed to ROTC units armed and trained by the Philippine Marine Corps.
Designated marksman rifles & Sniper rifles
	M21 Sniper Weapon System	United States	Sniper rifle	7.62×51mm	M21	unknown	
	Marine Scout Sniper Rifle	Philippines	Designated marksman rifle	5.56×45mm	MSSR 4th Gen MSSR 5th Gen	unknown	Introduced in 1996, developed by the PMC based on M16A1 rifle. Primary sniper rifle of PMC Scout Snipers.
	Remington Model 700	United States	Sniper rifle	7.62×51mm	M40A3 M40A5	unknown ~100	Introduced the M700P in 2004, modified by the PMC to M40A3 standard to suit their requirements. 148 units of M40A5 ordered by the Philippine Navy in 2016, 85 were delivered in February 2017, the rest were delivered before end of 2017. Marines received majority of the sniper rifles.
	Barrett M95	United States	Anti-material sniper rifle	.50 BMG	M95	unknown	Used by Marine Scout Snipers.
	Zastava M93 Black Arrow	Serbia	Anti-material rifle	.50 BMG	M93	unknown	Donated to the PMC by a private entity, in limited numbers.
Machine guns
	FN Minimi	Belgium	Light machine gun	5.56×45mm	Minimi	76	In limited service.
	System Defence MFR56	Turkey	Light machine gun	5.56×45mm	MFR56	233 (+73)	Acquired to replace FN Minimi as standard 5.56mm squad automatic weapon. Public bid won by System Defence of Turkiye. Initial order for 160 units delivered in 2023. Second order for 73 units was made in 2024 and delivered in 2025. Third order of 73 units expected to be contracted by 2025 and delivery by 2026-2027.
	Mertsav MMG762	Turkey	General-purpose machine gun	7.62×51mm	MMG762 Infantry MMG762 Vehicle mounted	95 6	New standard 7.62mm machine gun being introduced to complement and ultimately replace the M60 series. A copy of the Belgian FN Minimi made by Turkish arms manufacturer Mertsav. Another 6 units vehicle mounted variants ordered for installation on Kovico KMPV light armored vehicles.
	M60 machine gun	United States	General-purpose machine gun	7.62×51mm	M60E3 M60E4 M60E6	unknown 230 unknown	Standard general purpose machine gun. 230 new M60E4 (Mk. 43) delivered in 2014. Several older M60E3 were refurbished to M60E4 standards by Government Arsenal. US provided several units of new M60E6 delivered in June 2017 for MARSOG.
	M1919 Browning machine gun	United States	Medium machine gun	.30-06 Springfield	M1919A4 M1919A6	unknown	Used for static/base defense, mounted on vehicles, including gun trucks, and training of auxiliary and reserve units.
	M2 Browning	United States	Heavy machine gun	.50 BMG	M2 M2A1	unknown	Standard heavy machine gun. Either on tripod or vehicle mounted. Several more units received in 2021.
	M134 Minigun	United States	Rotary machine gun	7.62×51mm NATO	M134D	4	Delivered in June 2017.
Grenade launchers
	M203 grenade launcher	United States	Grenade launcher	40 mm	M203 M203A1 M203EXPIC LMP300L360	unknown 720 200	M203s are attached with M16A1 rifles, while M203A1 are attached with M4 rifles. 720 units of M203EXPIC grenade launchers acquired in 2015, and are attached with the Remington R4A3 rifles. 100 LMT LMP300L3260 grenade launchers donated by the US government and delivered to MARSOG in June 2017, and attached to LMT CQB 5.56mm rifles.
	M320 Grenade Launcher Module	Germany	Grenade launcher	40 mm	M320	unknown	M320 stand-alone. Attached to HK416 carbine. Several units are in stand-alone system.
	M79 grenade launcher	United States	Grenade launcher	40 mm	M79	unknown	
	Milkor MGL	United States	Grenade launcher	40 mm	M32A1	unknown	In limited numbers.
	STK 40 AGL	Singapore	Automatic grenade launcher	40 mm	Standard	8	8 ordered in 2014.

== Anti-tank and assault weapons ==
Picture	Model	Origin	Type	Caliber	Variant	Notes
	RPG-7	Bulgaria	Rocket-propelled grenade launcher	40mm	Arsenal ATGL-L	On 14 April 2021, 702 units of 40 mm ATGL-L rocket launcher plus associated accessories and ammunition were delivered by Bulgaria's Arsenal JSCo under a contract worth Php514.8 million.
	Armbrust	Germany; Singapore	Anti-tank Weapon	67mm	Armbrust AT	Sourced from Singapore, in limited numbers as an alternative to recoilless rifles.
	M72 LAW	United States	Anti-tank Weapon	66mm	unknown	In limited service with the Force Reconnaissance Battalion.
	M40	United States	Recoilless rifle	105mm	M40	Vehicle mounted, mostly on M151 or MMPV vehicles.
	M67	United States	Recoilless rifle	90mm	M67	Standard shoulder-mounted assault and anti-tank weapon.

== Anti-aircraft weapons ==
Picture	Model	Origin	Type	Variant	In Service	Notes
Towed Anti-Aircraft Guns
	Bofors 40 mm L/60	Sweden/United States	Anti-Aircraft gun	Single Naval Mk. 3 Twin Naval Mk. 16	16+	Formerly ship-mounted anti-aircraft guns, transferred to the PMC. Mounted on trailer carriages. More being planned as the navy transfers more gun mounts to the PMC.
	Oerlikon 20 mm gun	Switzerland/United States	Anti-Aircraft gun	Single Naval Mk. 10	No more than 127 units	Formerly ship-mounted anti-aircraft guns, transferred to the PMC. Mounted on M35 2 1/2-ton trucks.
	M2 Browning	United States	Heavy machine gun	Twin Naval Mk. 56	–	Formerly patrol boat-mounted guns, either mounted on a naval gun tub fitted on an M35 2 1/2-ton trucks that tows the Bofors 40mm anti-aircraft gun trailers, or on trailer mounts.
Self-Propelled Anti-aircraft Weapon
	M35 SPAA Trucks	Philippines/United States	Self-propelled anti-aircraft weapon	M35 20mm SPAA(Equipped with an Mk 4 20mm cannon on a Mk 10 series mount) M35 Twin 50 caliber(Equipped with an Mk 56 Mod 0 Twin .50 caliber machine gun turret)	2+	Constructed by the Philippine Marines based on the M35 Military Truck. Only 2 were supposedly made, however, reports also surfaced for additional 2 or more units due to the many pictures surfacing from these SPAA trucks.

== Communication equipment ==
Picture	Model	Origin	Type	Variant	Notes
	AN/PRC-150 Falcon II	United States	Manpack Combat Radio	RF-5800H-MP	Introduced in 2004. 15 units received in 2005, more units delivered in 2008 and 2011.
	AN/PRC-152 Falcon III	United States	Handheld Combat Radio	RF-5800V-HH	Introduced in 2004. 103 units received in 2005, More units delivered in 2008 and 2011.

== Night-vision, Thermal, and Reflex Sights equipment ==
Picture	Model	Origin	Type	Variant	Notes
	AN/PVS-14	United States	Monocular Night Vision Device	M914A	
	AN/PVS-7	United States	Binocular Night Vision Device	–	
	Night Optics Argus D-740	United States	Night Vision Weapons Sight	D-740	Used on Night Fighting Weapon System Rifles
	Night Optics Gladius D-760	United States	Night Vision Weapons Sight	D-740	Used on Night Fighting Weapon System Rifles
	Litton M845	United States	Night Vision Weapons Sight	M845 Mk.II	Used on Night Fighting Weapon System Rifles
	AN/PEQ-2	United States	Target Pointer/ Illuminator/ Aiming Light	–	
	AN/PAS-13	United States	Weapon-mounted Thermal Sight	Light Weapon Thermal Sight (LMTS); Medium Weapon Thermal Sight (MWTS)	Provided by the US from 2003 as part of Excess Defense Articles grant.
	FLIR Systems Recon M18	United States	Thermal Imager	Recon M18	Provided by the US Military Assistance grants to both the Philippine Marine Corps and Philippine Navy Naval Special Operations Group.
	FLIR Systems Recon M24	United States	Lightweight Thermal Imager	Recon M24	Provided by the US Military Assistance grants to both the Philippine Marine Corps and Philippine Navy Naval Special Operations Group.
	FLIR Systems Scout	United States	Lightweight Thermal Imager	Scout; Scout II	Acquired through annual capital outlay acquisitions from 2015 onwards.
	Elbit Systems XACT	Israel	Thermal Weapon Sight	XACT th64	Acquired through annual capital outlay acquisitions from 2015 onwards.
	FLIR Systems Thermosight	United States	Thermal Weapon Sight	ThermoSight T75	Acquired through annual capital outlay acquisitions from 2015 onwards.
	Trijicon IR Hunter	United States	Thermal Weapon Sight	IR-Hunter REAP-IR	Acquired through annual capital outlay acquisitions from 2015 onwards.
	ITL MARS	Israel	Multipurpose Reflex Sight and Laser Designator	MARS	Acquired from 2012 as part of larger acquisition including other AFP services branches
	Hikmicro Falcon	China	Handheld Thermal Monoocular	Falcon	
	Guide Sensmart IR	China	Handheld Thermal Monoocular	IR517	

== See also ==
- List of active military aircraft of the Philippines
- List of equipment of the Philippine Army
- List of equipment of the Philippine Air Force
- List of equipment of the Philippine Navy
