= Manpack Loudspeaker Version IV =

Military loudspeaker developed by the Philippine Army

Manpack Loudspeaker
- Type: Transceiver
- Place of origin: Philippines

Service history
- In service: 2013-present
- Used by: Philippine Army
- Wars: Civil conflict in the Philippines

Production history
- Designer: Civil Military Operations Group

The Manpack Loudspeaker (MLX) is a military loudspeaker. It was developed and operated by the Civil Military Operations Group (CMOG) of the Philippine Army for information support affairs operations.

== History ==
The equipment was used by the CMOG at the Zamboanga City crisis of 2013 where it was used to broadcast to Moro National Liberation Front members the procedure for surrendering to government forces. It was also used to broadcast military songs to boost the morale of government troops in the operation.

The Manpack Loudspeaker Version IV (MLX4) was also used in the same year as part of the AFP's Disaster Response Operations following the onslaught of Typhoon Haiyan (Yolanda). The equipment was used to relay messages to victims seeking to receive relief goods as well as provide moral support by playing Christmas and other inspirational songs in December of that year.

== Variants ==
- MLX-4
- MLX-5
- MLX-6
- MLX-7 - Reduced weight (14kg), increased battery life and increased effective range compared to previous versions. Introduced in 2021.

== Images ==
Gallery
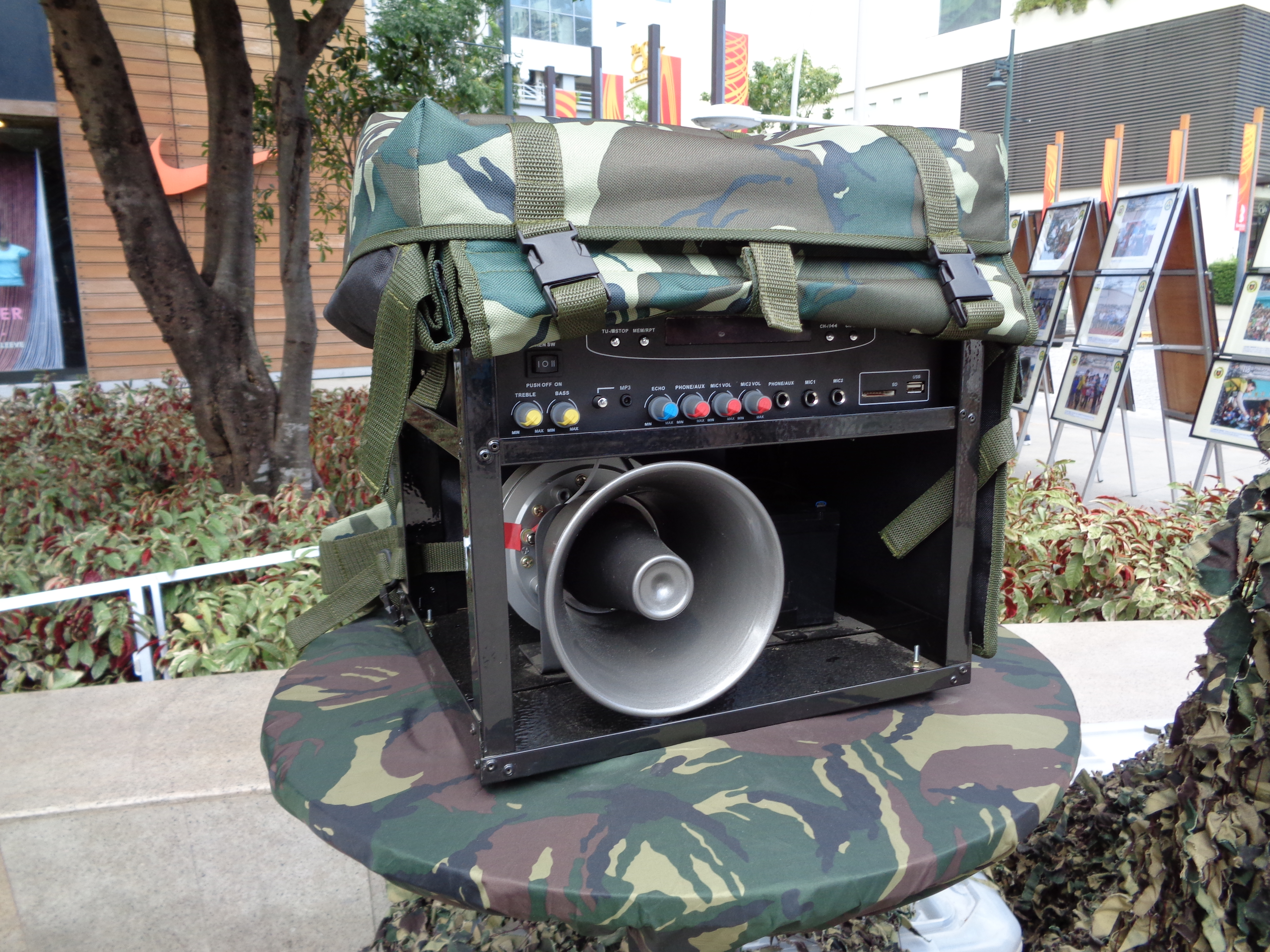
MLX4 front view

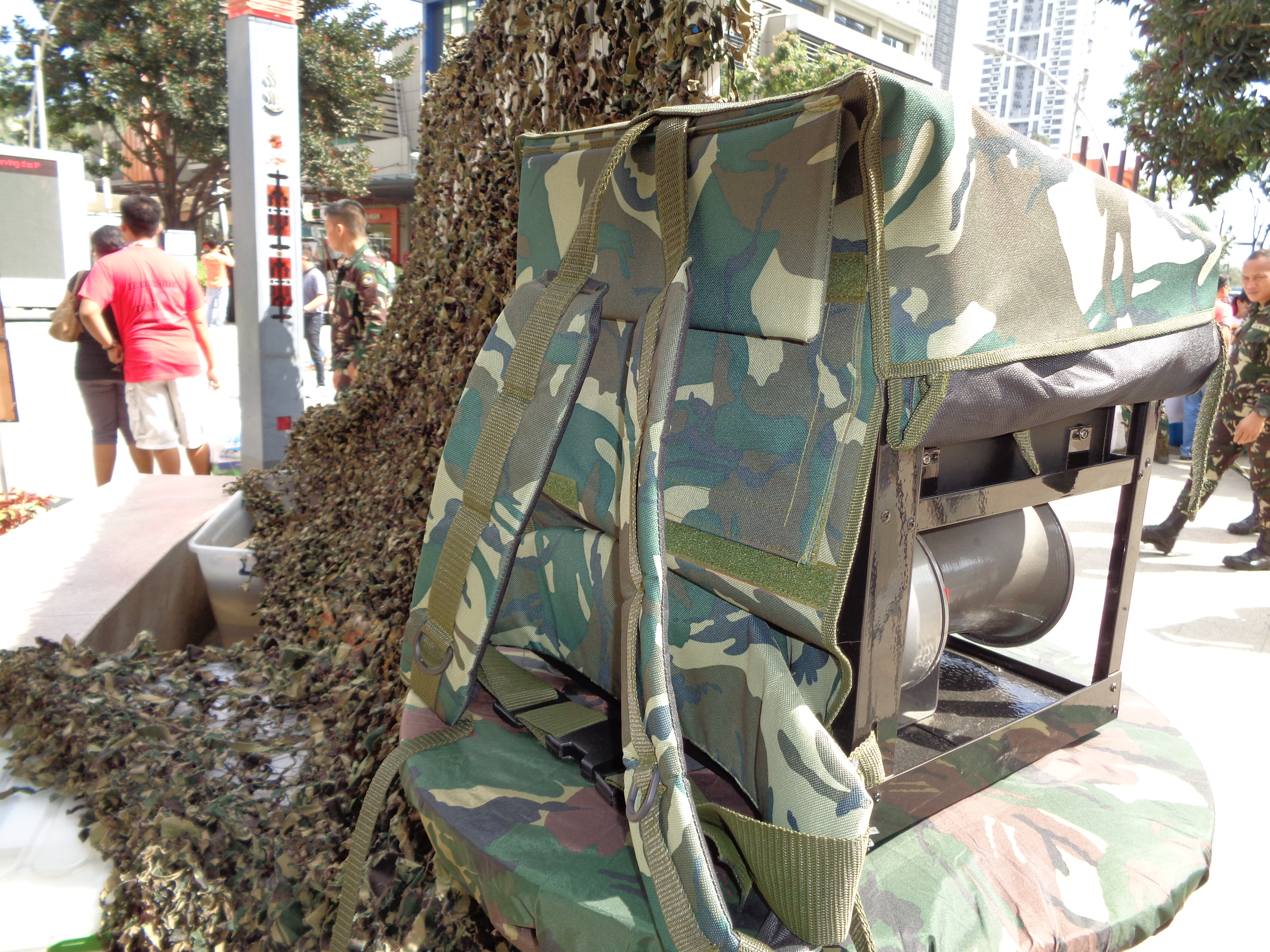
Rear view

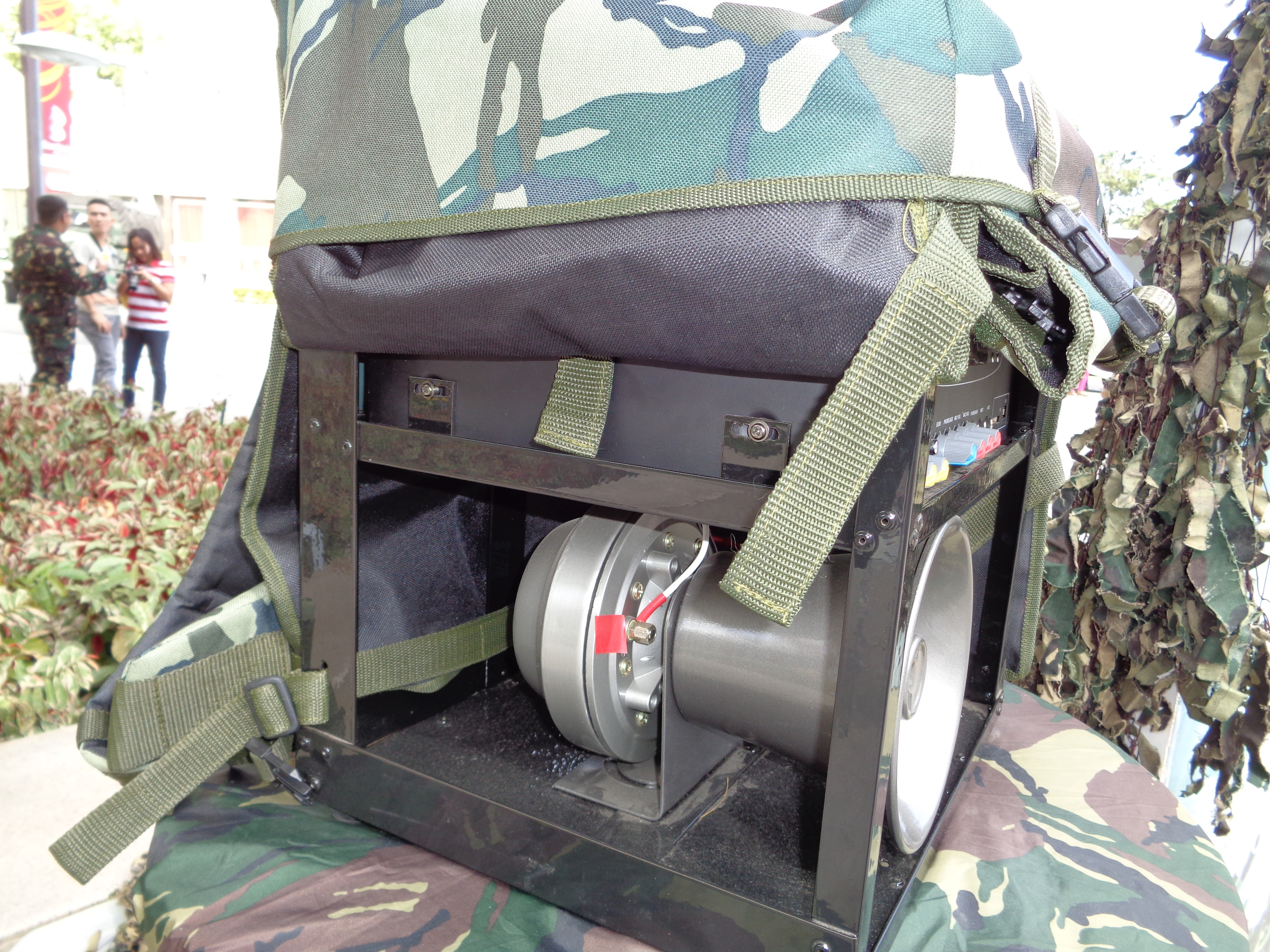
Side view

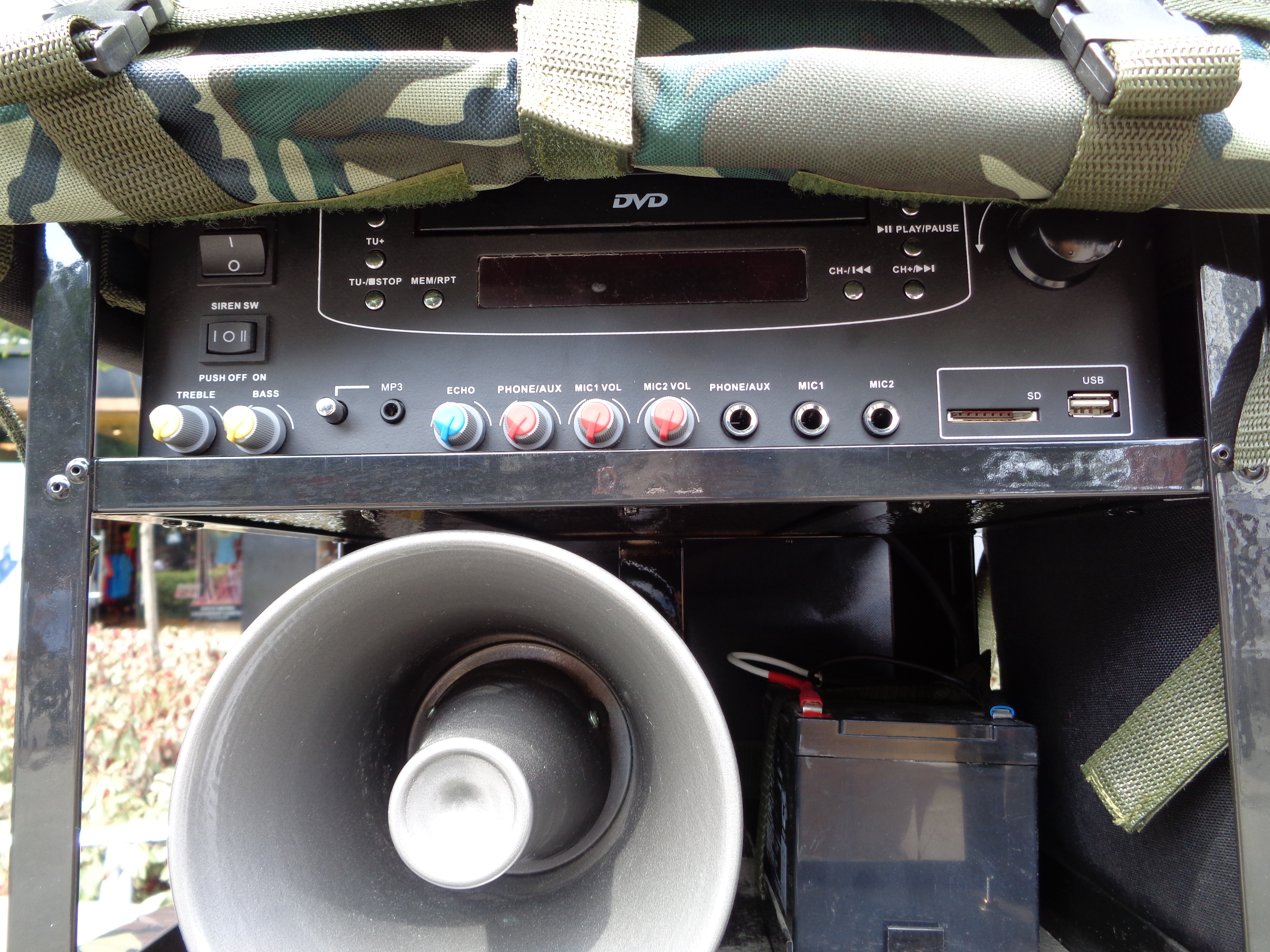
Control panel

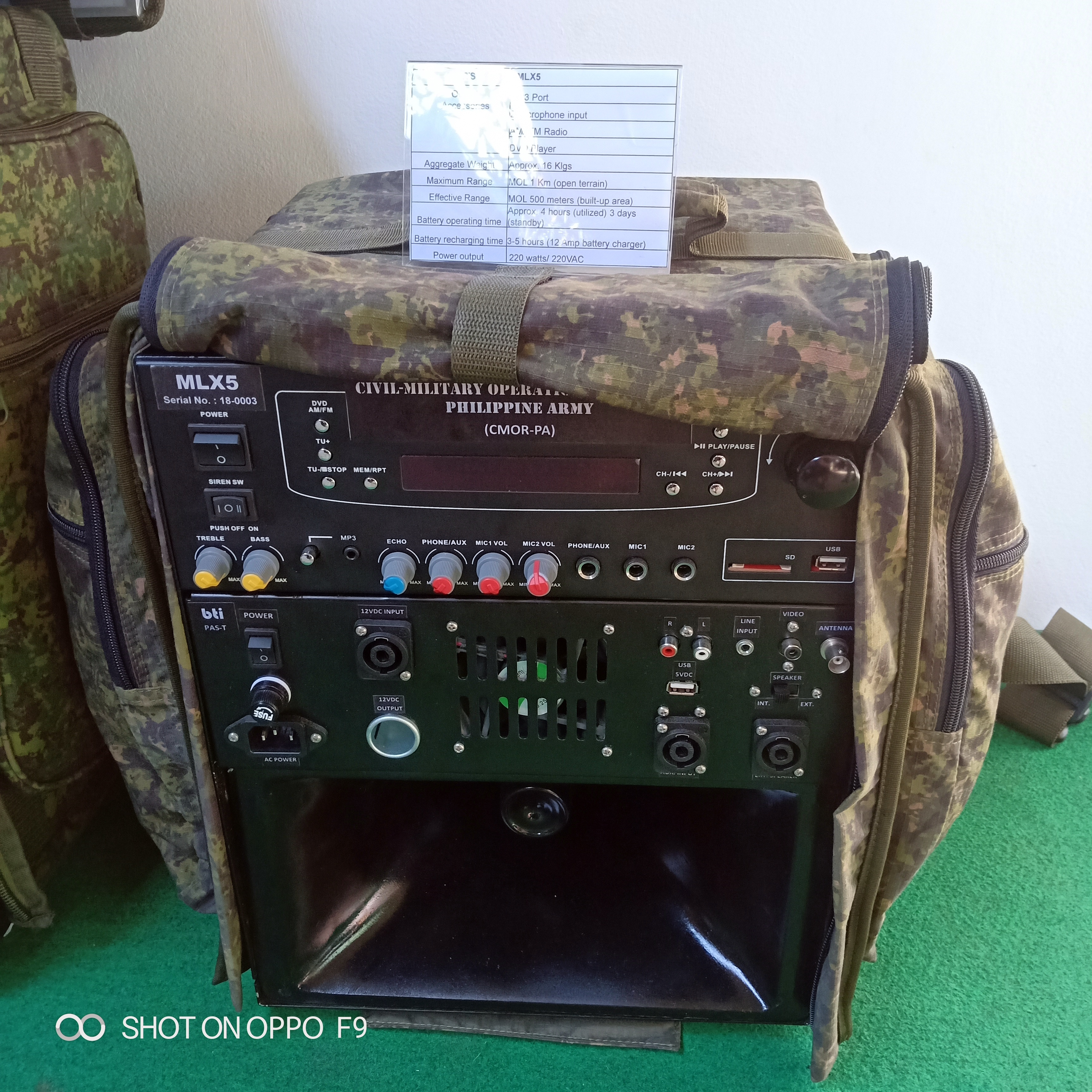
MLX5 Loudspeaker System

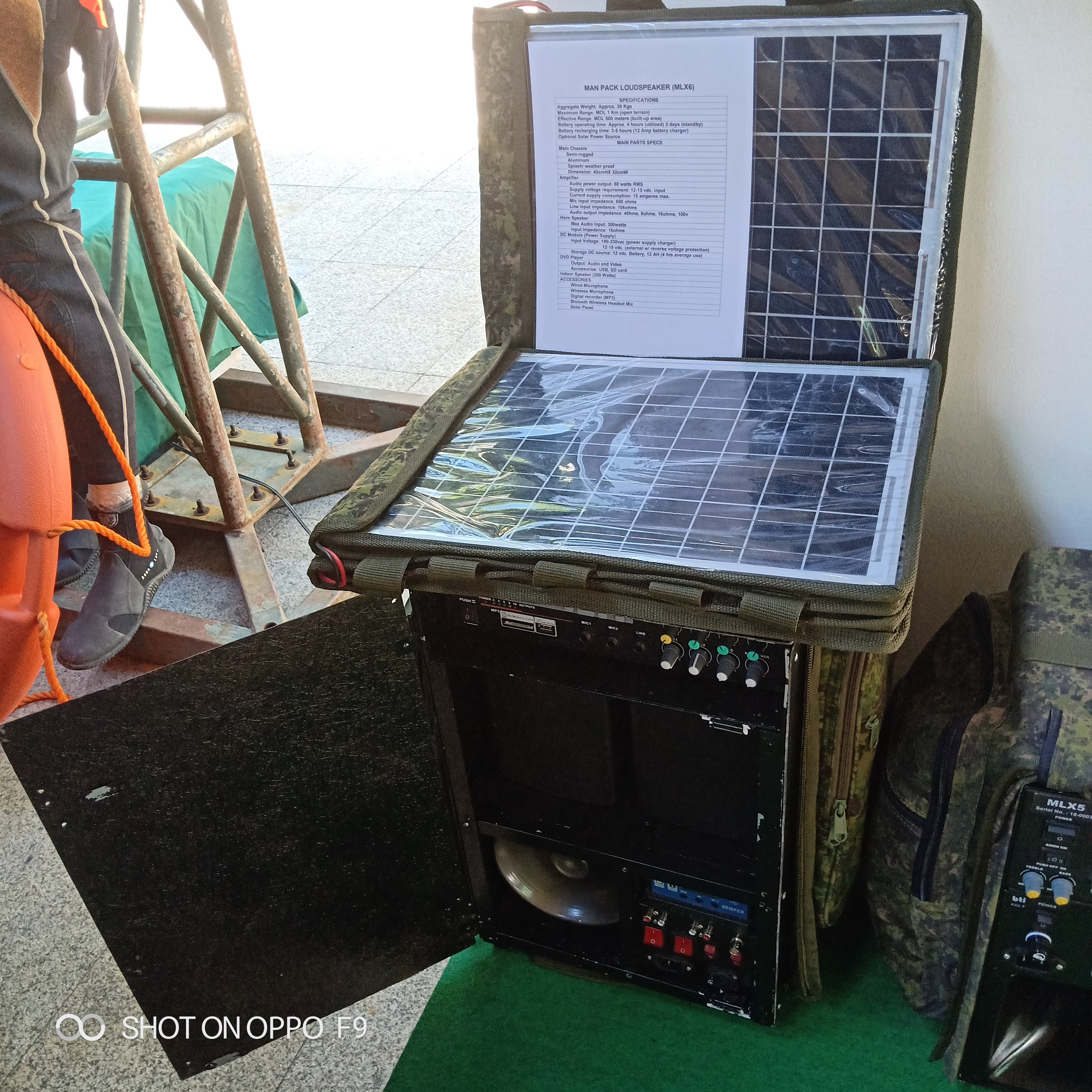
MLX6 Loudspeaker System
