= Remington R4 =

Assault rifle Semi-automatic rifle

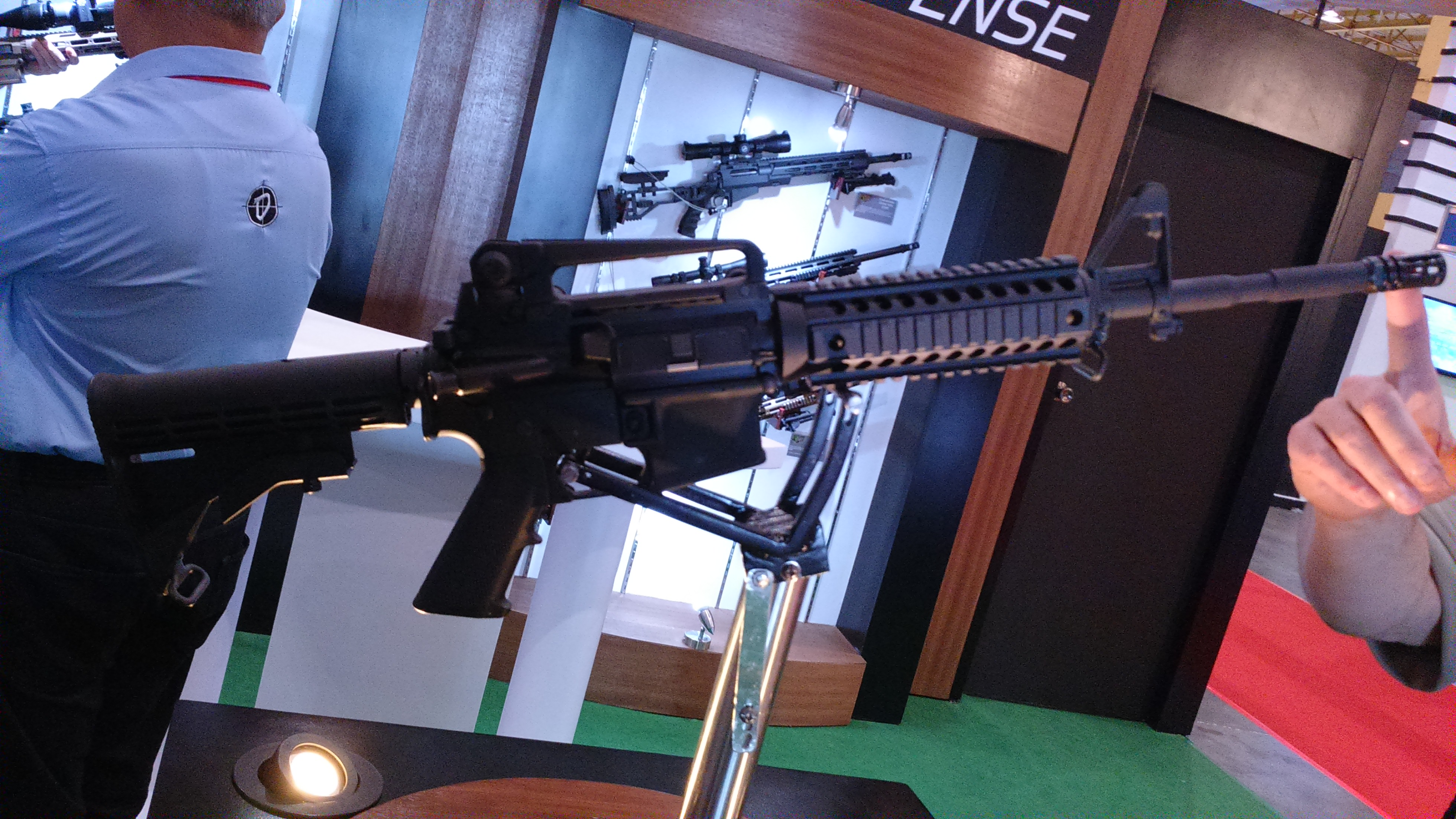
- Type: Assault rifle Semi-automatic rifle Carbine
- Place of origin: United States

Service history
- In service: 2012–present
- Wars: ISIL insurgency in the Philippines; Islamic State insurgency in Iraq (2017-present)

Production history
- Manufacturer: Remington Arms Company
- Produced: 2012 – c. 2020

Specifications
- Barrel length: R4 Patrol/Operator/Enhanced: 11.5 in (290 mm); R4 Patrol/Operator/Enhanced: 14.5 in (370 mm); R4 Patrol/Operator/Enhanced: 16 in (410 mm); R4 Patrol 20 in (510 mm)
- Cartridge: 5.56×45mm NATO
- Caliber: 5.56mm
- Action: Gas-operated, closed rotating bolt, Stoner bolt and carrier piston
- Feed system: STANAG magazine

The Remington R4 is a firearms platform based on the AR-15/M16/M4/M4A1 series designed and manufactured by Remington Arms.

== Design ==
In 2012, when the R4 was introduced, the platform was available in four variants: the 7-inch R4-C, 11.5-inch R4-E, 14.5-inch R4 and 20-inch R4-M. In 2018, the platform changed to three variants: the R4 Patrol, R4 Operator, and R4 Enhanced.

In 2012, the Queensland Police Service placed an order for 420 R4 carbines at a cost of almost AUD$1 million to replace the Ruger Mini-14.

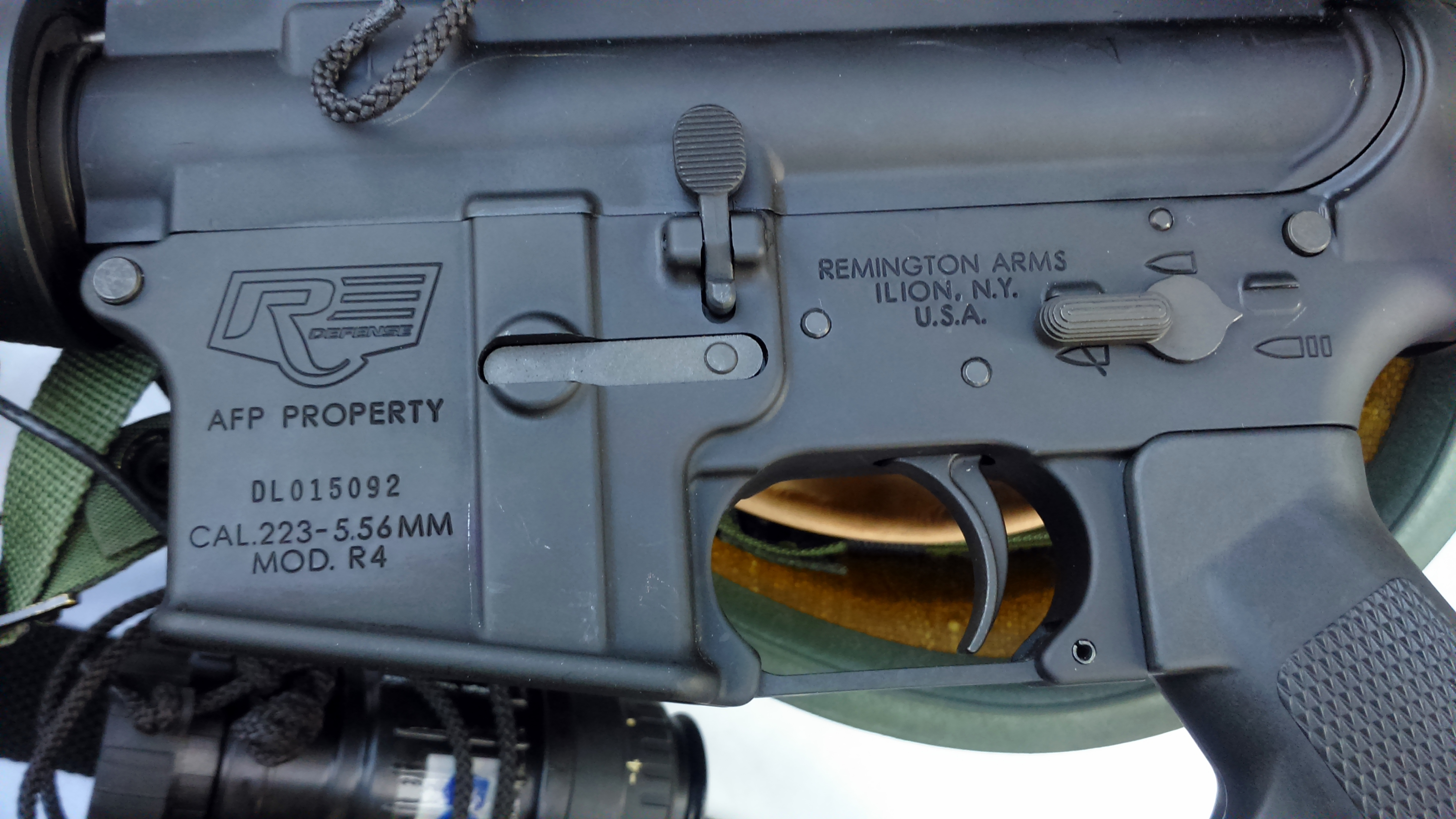
Close-up Remington R4 rifle receiver

In 2013, Remington announced it had been awarded a US$47 million contract by the Armed Forces of the Philippines, for the Philippine Army and the Philippine Marine Corps, placing an order for over 40,000 R4 carbines. The Armed Forces of the Philippines later increased the order to 63,286 R4s which are designated as the R4A3 which is equivalent to the Colt M4 R0977 model and replaces early model M16s.

In March 2015, Remington announced that it would offer the R4 to the civilian market.

In July 2018, Remington announced that it had been awarded a US$28 million contract by the United States Army for 5.56mm carbines on behalf of key international allies.

== Variants ==
=== R10 ===
In 2019, Remington unveiled a modified version of the R4, intended to function as a battle rifle by firing the more powerful 7.62×51mm NATO cartridge.

== Users ==
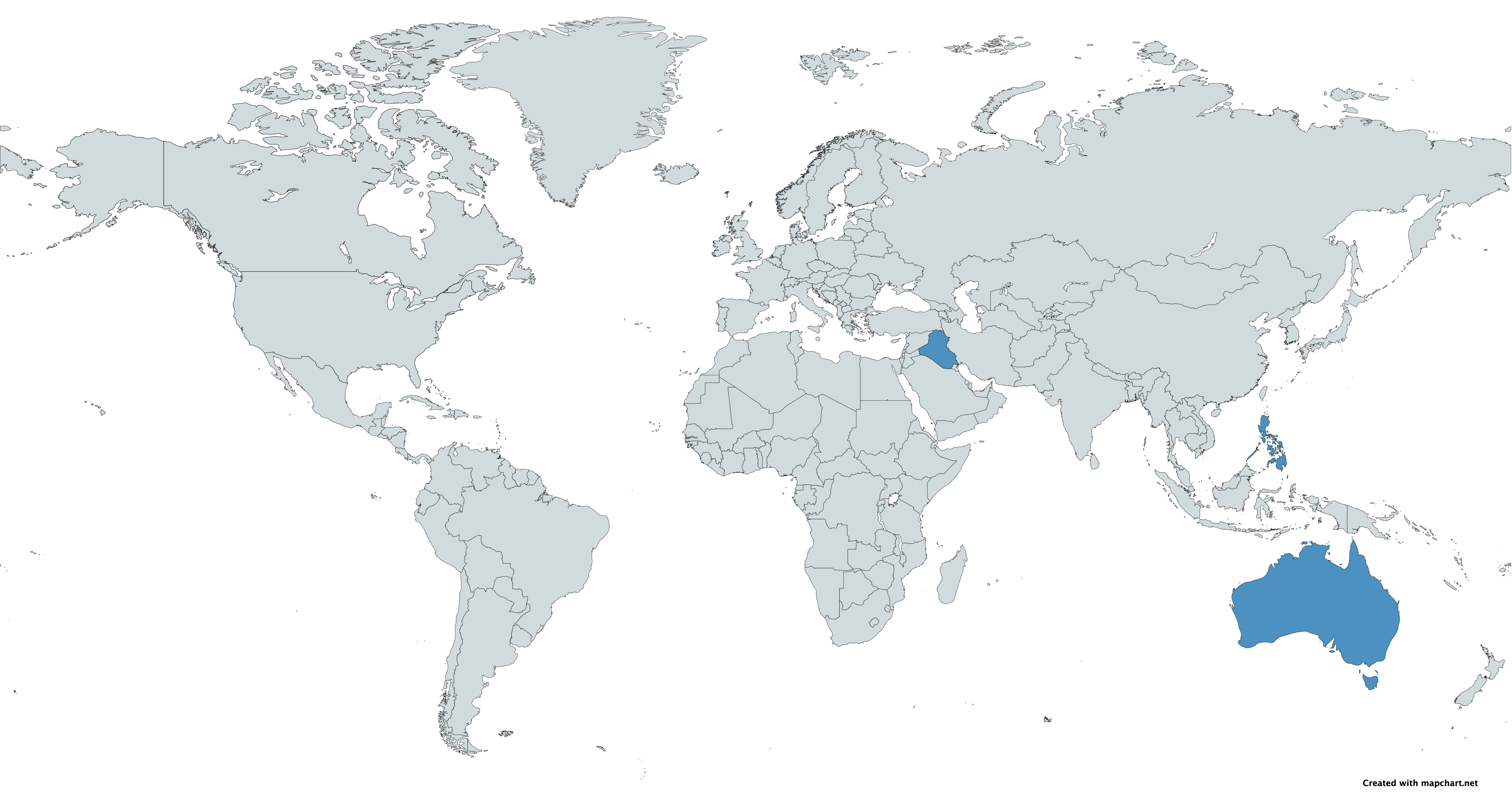
A map with nations who use the Remington R4 in blue

- Australia: Used by the Queensland Police Service.
- Iraq: Used by the Iraqi Special Operations Forces.
- Philippines: Used by the Philippine Army and the Philippine Marine Corps as its next standard-issue rifle.
