= List of HALO/HAHO jump–capable units =

This page lists the military units which are known to be capable of performing a HAHO/HALO jump, also known as military free fall (MFF).

== Albania ==
- Special Operations Battalion
- Commando Battalion

== Algeria ==
- Algerian special forces
- 104th Operational Maneuvers Regiment (104th RMO)
- 116th Operational Maneuvers Regiment (116th RMO)

== Argentina ==
- Grupo Especial de Operaciones Federales (Federal Operations Special Group, GEOF)
- Buzos Tacticos (Tactical Divers Group)
- Agrupacion de Comando Anfibios (Amphibious Commandos Group)
- GOE (Special Operations Group)

== Armenia ==
- Army special forces regiment

== Australia ==
- Army
  - Australian Defence Force Parachuting School
    - Australian Army Parachute Display Team (The Red Berets)
  - Special Operations Command
    - Special Air Service Regiment
    - 2nd Commando Regiment

== Austria ==
- Jagdkommando
- EKO Cobra
- Jägerbattalion 25

== Bangladesh ==
- Army
  - Para-Commando Brigade
- Navy
  - SWADS

== Belgium ==
- Special Operations Regiment

== Brazil ==
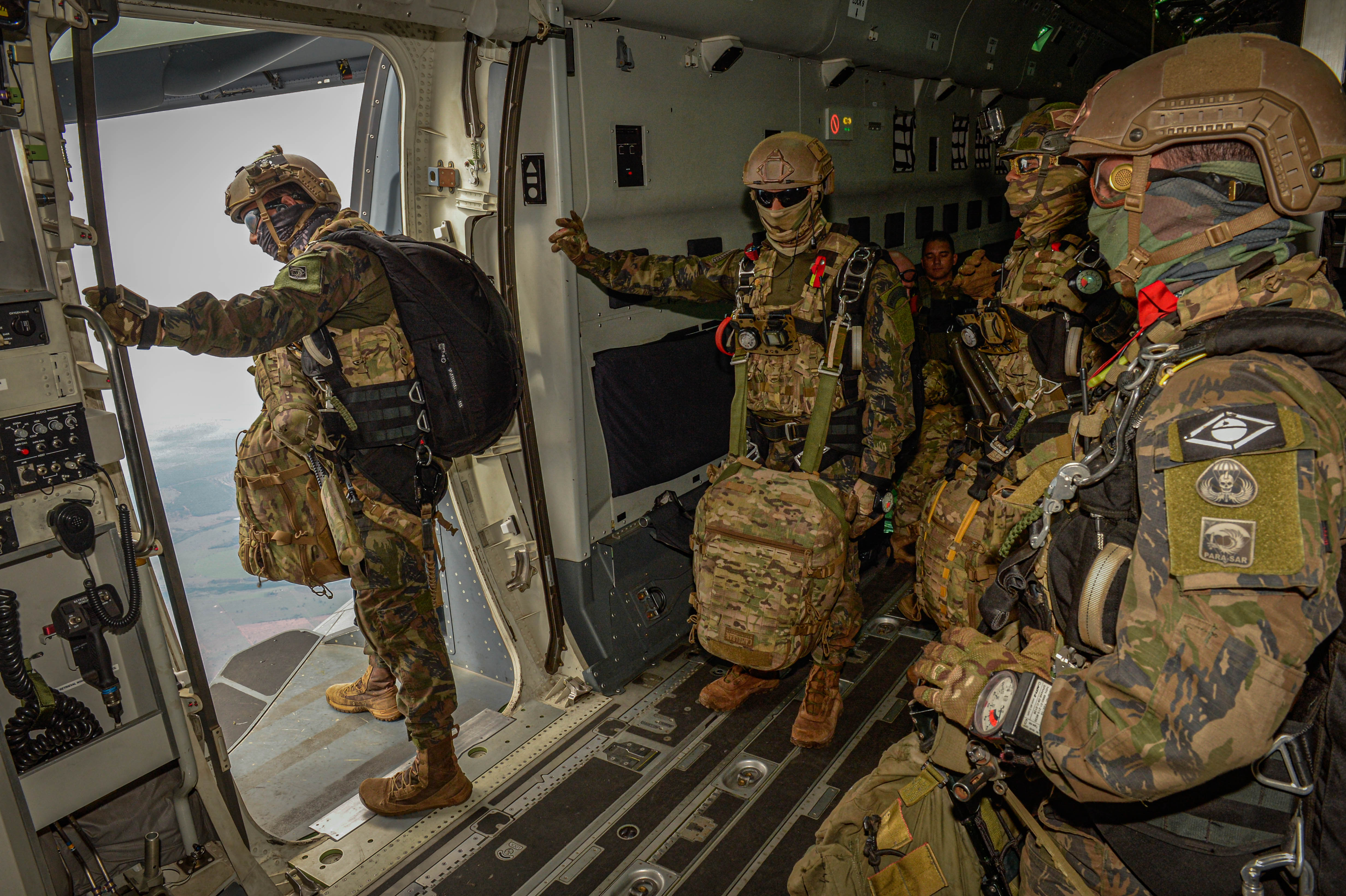
Para-SAR during an exercise

- Brazilian Navy
  - GRUMEC Combat Divers Groupment
- Brazilian Marine Corps
  - COMANF Special Operations Battalion
- Brazilian Army
  - 1º Batalhão de Ações de Comandos 1st Commando Actions Battalion
  - 1º Batalhão de Forcas Especiais 1st Special Forces Battalion
  - 3ª Cia FEsp 3rd Special Forces Company
  - Precursores Paraquedistas Army Pathfinders
- Brazilian Air Force
  - Para-SAR Special Operations & SAR squadron

== Canada ==
- Canadian Special Operations Forces Command
  - Joint Task Force 2
  - Canadian Special Operations Regiment
- Canadian Army Advanced Warfare Centre
  - SkyHawks Parachute Team
- Canadian Armed Forces Search and Rescue Technicians
- Air Drop Systems Technicians

== Chile ==
- Chilean Army – Chilean Commandos

== China ==
- People's Liberation Army Air Force
  - People's Liberation Army Air Force Airborne Corps
- People's Liberation Army Navy
  - People's Liberation Army Navy Marine Corps
    - Jiaolong Commando Unit
    - Reconnaissance Battalion, 2nd Marine Brigade
- People's Liberation Army Ground Force
  - 73rd Special Operation Brigade – "Feilong"
  - 75th Special Operation Brigade – "Jungle Tigers"
  - 76th Special Operation Brigade – "Xuefeng"
  - 78th Special Operation Brigade – "Northeastern Tiger"
  - 84th Special Operation Brigade – "Kunlun Blade"
- People's Armed Police
  - Snow Leopard Commando Unit

== Croatia ==
- General Staff of the Armed Forces of the Republic of Croatia Special Operations Battalion
- Croatian Ministry of the Interior Lučko Anti-Terrorist Unit

== Cyprus ==
- Special Forces Command

== Czech Republic ==
- 601st Special Forces Group
- 43rd Airborne Regiment
  - Combat Support Center
- 102nd Recon Battalion
  - Deep Reconnaissance Company

== Denmark ==
- Jægerkorpset Hunter Corps

== France ==
- 11^{e} Brigade Parachutiste:
  - Groupement des Commandos Parachutistes (Pathfinders)
- Commandement des Opérations Spéciales:
  - 1^{er} Régiment de Parachutistes d'Infanterie de Marine
  - 13^{e} Régiment de Dragons Parachutistes
  - Commandos Marine
  - Commando parachutiste de l'air no 10
- Direction Générale de la Sécurité Extérieure:
  - Division Action
- Gendarmerie Nationale:
  - Groupe d'Intervention de la Gendarmerie Nationale
  - Escadron Parachutiste d'Intervention de la Gendarmerie Nationale
- Police Nationale:
  - Recherche Assistance Intervention Dissuasion

== Finland ==
- Finnish Army Special Jaegers
- Finnish Army Para Jaegers

== Georgia ==
- Army
  - GSOF
- State Security Service
  - Counter-Terrorism Center special operations unit

== Germany ==
- German Army
  - Kommando Spezialkräfte
  - Fallschirmjäger
  - Fernspähkompanie LRRP
- German Navy
  - Kampfschwimmer
- German Air Force
  - Kampfretter
- German Federal Police
  - GSG 9 Police Counter Terrorism Unit

== Greece ==
- Army
  - ETA (Special Airborne Unit)
  - Z' MAK (Z' Amphibious Raider Squadron)
- Navy
  - DYK (Underwater Demolitions Command)
- Air Force
  - 31 MEEΔ (31 Search & Rescue Operations Squadron)
- Police
  - EKAM (Special Suppressive Antiterrorist Unit)

== India ==
- Army
  - Parachute Regiment (India)
  - Para (Special Forces)
- Air Force
  - Garud Commando Force
- Navy
  - MARCOS
- Paramilitary Forces
  - Special Frontier Force
  - National Security Guards

== Indonesia ==
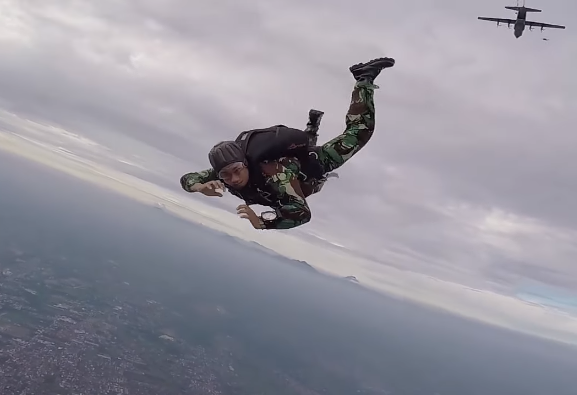
Paskhas soldier free-fall

- Indonesian Army
  - Kopassus
  - Kostrad airborne brigades
- Indonesian Navy
  - KOPASKA
  - Denjaka
- Indonesian Marine Corps
  - Batalyon Intai Amfibi
- Indonesian Air Force
  - Paskhas
  - Bravo-Den 90

== Ireland ==
- Army Ranger Wing (ARW)

== Israel ==
- Sayeret Matkal
- Shayetet 13
- Shaldag
- Unit 669
- Maglan
- Egoz
- Duvdevan
- Paratroopers reconnaissance battalion
- Paratroopers brigade

== Italy ==
- Army
  - 9th Paratroopers Assault Regiment "Col Moschin" (9º Reggimento d'Assalto Paracadutisti "Col Moschin")
  - 185th RAO Regiment "Folgore" (185° Reggimento Ricognizione Acquisizione Obiettivi "Folgore")
- Navy
  - Operational Raiders Group – Divers and Riders Group Command "Teseo Tesei" (Gruppo Operativo Incursori – Comando Raggruppamento Subacquei e Incursori "Teseo Tesei")
- Air Force
  - Operational Raiders Group – 17th Raiders Wing (Gruppo Operativo Incursori – 17º Stormo)
- Gendarmerie
  - Special Intervention Group (GIS – Gruppo di Intervento Speciale)
- Police
  - Central Security Operational Unit (NOCS – Nucleo Operativo Centrale di Sicurezza)

== Japan ==
- Japan Ground Self-Defense Force
  - Special Forces Group
  - Pathfinder Platoon of the 1st Airborne Brigade
- Japan Maritime Self-Defense Force
  - Special Boarding Unit

== Korea (Republic of Korea/"South Korea") ==
- Republic of Korea Army Special Warfare Command
  - Army Special Forces Brigades
  - 707th Special Mission Group
- Republic of Korea Naval Special Warfare Flotilla
- Republic of Korea Air Force
  - Combat Control Team (CCT)
  - Special Air Force Rescue Team (SART)
- Republic of Korea Marine Corps – Special Reconnaissance

== Morocco ==
- 1st Parachute Infantry Brigade
- Moroccan Special Forces SOTGH

== Malaysia ==
- Malaysian Army
  - Grup Gerak Khas
  - 10 Paratrooper Brigade
- Royal Malaysian Navy
  - PASKAL
- Royal Malaysian Air Force
  - PASKAU
- Royal Malaysian Police
  - Pasukan Gerakan Khas
- Malaysian Coast Guard
  - Special Task and Rescue

== Namibia ==
- Namibian Special Forces

== Netherlands ==
- Dutch Korps Commandotroepen (KCT) Royal Netherlands Army Commandos
- Dutch Netherlands Maritime Special Operations Forces (NLMARSOF)
- Dutch 11th Airmobile Brigade (Netherlands) Pathfinder platoon "Madju"

== New Zealand ==
- New Zealand Special Air Service

== Norway ==
- Hærens Jegerkommando HJK – Army Ranger Command
- Marinejegerkommandoen MJK – Navy Ranger Command
- Forsvarets spesialkommando FSK – Armed Forces Special Command

== Pakistan ==
- Pakistan Army
  - Special Service Group
  - Parachute Regiment
- Pakistan Navy
  - Special Service Group Navy
  - Pakistan Marines
- Pakistan Air Force
  - Special Service Wing

== Peru ==
- Fuerza de Operaciones Especiales (FOES) (Peruvian Navy)
- Defensa y Operaciones Especiales (DOE) (Peruvian Air Force)

== Philippines ==
Army:

- Special Forces Regiment (Philippines)
- Light Reaction Regiment
- 1st Scout Ranger Regiment

Navy:

- Naval Special Operations Command

Marine Corps:

- Force Reconnaissance Group

Air Force:

- SPOW
- 505th Search And Rescue Group

== Poland ==
- GROM
- 1 Pułk Specjalny Komandosów
- 6th Airborne Brigade

== Portugal ==
- Special Actions Detachment
- Pathfinders Company
- Special Operations Troops Centre

== Romania ==
- Special Operations Forces Command

Army:

- 313th Reconnaissance Battalion "Burebista"

Air Force:

- Combat Search and Rescue Detachment

Gendarmerie:

- Gendarmerie Special Intervention Brigade

== Russia and the Soviet Union ==
- GRU Special Forces:
  - Detachments in each of the special forces Brigades of the Ground Forces
  - 45th Detached Reconnaissance Regiment of the VDV
  - Reconnaissance Frogmen of the Russian Navy
- Command of Special Operations Forces
  - Special Purpose Center "Senezh"
  - Special Purpose Center "Kubinka-2"
  - 561st Emergency Rescue Center
  - Special Aviation Brigade
- Federal Security Service
  - Group "A"
  - Group "B" (V)
  - Group "C" (S)
  - Group "K"
  - Regional UFSB teams
- Russian National Guard
  - Special Purpose Center Teams: Rus and Vityaz
  - SOBR Units
- Federal Protective Service
- SVR : Zaslon
- Russian Airborne Forces

== Serbia ==
- Special Brigade (Serbian army)

== Singapore ==
- Special Operations Force

== South Africa ==
- Special Forces Brigade
- 7 Medical Battalion Group
- 44 Parachute Regiment

== Spain ==
- Mando de Operaciones Especiales – (Spanish Army)
- Fuerza de Guerra Naval Especial – (Spanish Marines)
- Escuadron de Zapadores Paracaidistas – (Spanish Air Force)

== Sweden ==
- Särskilda operationsgruppen (SOG)

== Syria ==
- 25th Special Mission Forces Division

== Switzerland ==
- Fallschirmaufklärer Kompanie 17 (Swiss Army VBS)

== Taiwan (Republic of China) ==
- Republic of China Army
  - 862nd Special Warfare Group
  - Airborne Special Service Company

== Thailand ==
- 1st Special Forces Division (Royal Thai Army)
- Long Range Reconnaissance Patrols Company (LRRP) (Royal Thai Army)
- Royal Thai Navy SEALs (Royal Thai Navy)
- RTMC Reconnaissance Battalion (Royal Thai Marine Corps)
- Special Operations Regiment (Royal Thai Air Force)

== Turkey ==
- Special Forces Command
- Underwater Offence
- 1st Commando Brigade

== United Kingdom ==
- Special Air Service
- Special Boat Service
- Special Reconnaissance Regiment
- 18 (UKSF) Signal Regiment
- Pathfinder Platoon
- Royal Navy – Fleet Diving Group 1
- MI6 – E Squadron

== United States ==
=== Paramilitary Group ===
- CIA
  - Special Activities Center
- FBI
  - Hostage Rescue Team

=== Air Force ===
USASOC Military Free Fall Parachute Badge

- U.S. Air Force Pararescue
- U.S. Air Force Combat Control Team
- U.S. Air Force Tactical Air Control Party
- U.S. Air Force Special Reconnaissance
- U.S. Air Force S.E.R.E. Specialists
- U.S. Air Force Physiological Technicians (PTs)

=== Army ===
- Parachute Riggers
- Long Range Surveillance Companies
- U.S. Army 75th Ranger Regiment
  - Regimental Reconnaissance Company
- U.S. Army Special Forces
- U.S. Army 1st Special Forces Operational Detachment-Delta (also known as Delta Force)
- U.S. Army Intelligence Support Activity (USAIS) (also known as Intelligence Support Activity)
- RAVENS (Raiding Aggressor Volunteers Employing Night Skydiving—the very first operating unit—Ft. Campbell, KY, Sept. 1959)
- Airborne and Special Operations Test Directorate (ABNSOTD)

=== Marine Corps ===
- Parachute Riggers
- U.S. Marine Corps Force Reconnaissance
- U.S. Marine Raider Regiment

=== Navy ===
- U.S. Navy SEALs
  - SEAL Team Six (Naval Special Warfare Development Group, also known as DEVGRU)
- U.S. Navy SWCC
- U.S. Navy EOD
- U.S. Navy direct support personnel (IT/ET/CT Rates/SOIDC)
- U.S. Navy SARC
- Parachute Riggers
