= AFP Joint Special Operations Group =

Joint Special Operations Group
- Emblem of the AFP Joint Special Operations Group
- Active: 7 August 2003 - April 2018 (Deactivated)
- Country: Philippines
- Branch: Joint Branch
- Type: Special Forces
- Role: Airborne forces, direct action, reconnaissance, unconventional warfare
- Part of: Under the Armed Forces of the Philippines
- Garrison/HQ: JSOG Cpd, Camp Gen Emilio Aguinaldo, Quezon City
- Nicknames: AFP-JSOG, JSOG
- Mottos: "To Fight as One" "Combatemos como uno"
- Anniversaries: 7 August
- Engagements: 2013 Zamboanga Siege 2017 Marawi Siege; Operation Tsunami 1 Operation Tsunami 2 Operation Haribon 1 Operation Haribon 2 Operation Haribon 3
- Decorations: Philippine Republic Presidential Unit Citation Badge
- Battle honours: Presidential Unit Streamer Award

Commanders
- Current commander: BGen. Corleto S. Vinluan Jr., AFP
- Notable commanders: BGen. Jose B. Vizcarra, AFP MGen. Eduardo del Rosario, AFP BGen. Ramon Mateo Dizon, AFP MGen. Danilo G. Pamonag, AFP

Insignia
- Unit patch: JSOG Command Emblem

Aircraft flown
- Reconnaissance: Scan Eagle 1, Raven

The Armed Forces of the Philippines Joint Special Operations Group (abbrv. as JSOG or AFP JSOG) was one of the AFP's units tasked in conducting counter-terrorism, unconventional-guerrilla warfare, asymmetrical warfare, and highly specialized operations.

Prior to being disbanded, the JSOG has frequently worked alongside American special forces units.

== History ==
After the September 11 attacks in 2001, the US military worked with the AFP to establish the JSOG. It was based at Camp Aguinaldo.

On April 7, 2004, JSOG operators from the K-9 platoon were involved in "Oplan Paglalayag", tasked with ensuring port security for Holy Week.

In July 2014, a probe was launched on determine whether the deaths of six JSOG operators in Patikul, Sulu were due to friendly fire.

In April 2018, the AFP JSOG was deactivated and its officers and enlisted personnel were transferred to form the core of the new AFP Special Operations Command, (AFPSOCOM).

== Organization ==
The following structure was established in JSOG prior to its disbanding with 400 soldiers previously attached to it:

- Headquarters and headquarters company
- Light Reaction Regiment
  - Light Reaction Company 1
  - Light Reaction Company 2
  - Light Reaction Company 3
  - Light Reaction Company 4
  - Light Reaction Company 5
  - Light Reaction Company 6
- Naval Special Operations Group 8
- 710th Special Operations Wing
- 13th EOD Team, 1EODP, 1EODC, EODB, PA
- K-9 Platoon

== Lineage of commanding officers ==
- Col. Jose B. Vizcarra INF (GSC) PA
- Col. Eduardo D. Del Rosario INF (GSC) PA
- Col. Ramon Mateo U. Dizon INF (GSC) PA
- Col. Danilo G. Pamonag INF (GSC) PA
- Col. Teodoro A. Llamas INF (GSC) PA
- Col. Corleto S. Vinluan Jr. INF (GSC) PA
