= Parachutist Badge (Philippines) =

AFP Parachutist Badge
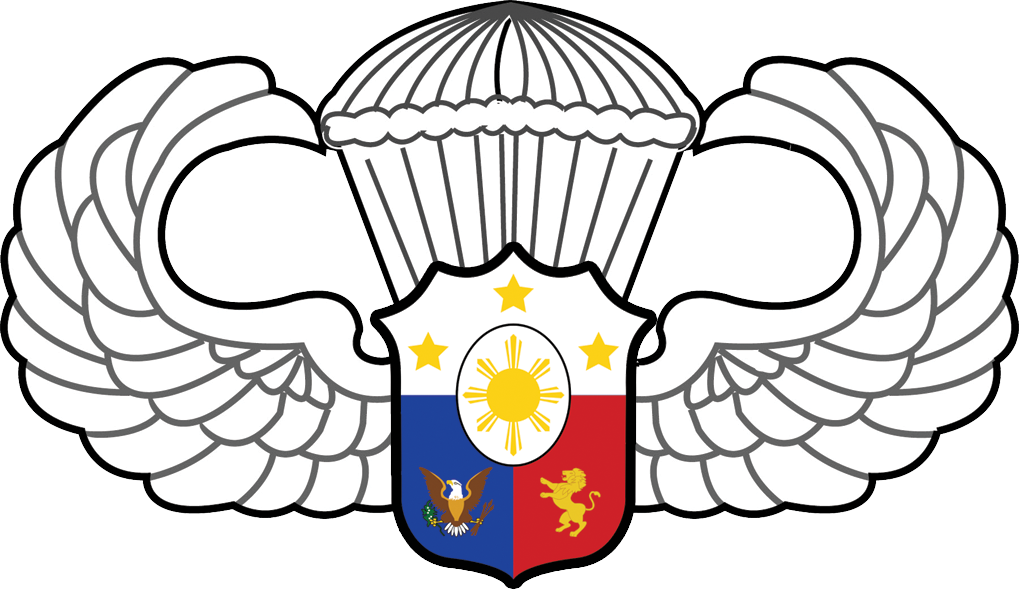
- AFP Parachutist Badge (Basic)
- Awarded for: completion of the Basic Airborne Course
- Country: Philippines
- Presented by: the Chief of Staff of the Armed Forces of the Philippines; Commanders of the Major Services
- Eligibility: military personnel who completed the Basic Airborne Course
- Status: Currently Awarded
- Related: Parachutist Badge (United States)

The Parachutist Badge of the Armed Forces of the Philippines is a skill badge awarded to Filipino military personnel who completes the Basic Parachutist Course.

It signifies that the soldier is a trained military parachutist and is qualified to participate in airborne operations.

== History ==
Airborne parachutists (more popularly known as paratroopers) were first deployed in 1945, during the latter stages of the Pacific Theater of the Second World War. They saw action in liberating the island of Corregidor, which was captured by the Japanese three years earlier.

In 1960, Philippine Army Captain (later Philippine Constabulary Chief, and President of the Philippines) Fidel Valdez Ramos, along with other officers, were sent by the Army establishment to undergo special operations warfare training in the United States. More importantly, they underwent Basic Airborne Training with the famed 82nd Airborne Division while they were there. It was by Ramos and the rest of his comrades that the first paratroopers trained by Filipinos were to be trained.

== Requirements ==
=== Training ===
An aspiring AFP service member who wishes to earn the Parachutist Badge must undergo the Basic Airborne Course. It is a 90-day course made open to all branches of service of the AFP. The training program includes (but not limited to):

- parachute freefall exercises,
- moving platform jump exercises,
- tower jump exercises (through ziplining),
- physical fitness training (while carrying a 30-pound main parachute, and a 15-pound reserve parachute, alongside individual combat equipment), and
- training jumps (using a round parachute)

==== Specialization Prerequisites ====
Earning the Parachutist Badge is a pre-requisite for the following units:

- the Special Forces Regiment (Airborne) (Philippine Army),
- the Light Reaction Regiment (Philippine Army),
- the 710th Special Operations Wing (Philippine Air Force), and
- the 505th Search and Rescue Group (Philippine Air Force)

Members of the First Scout Ranger Regiment (Philippine Army) are also qualified for the badge, although compared to their comrades in the SFR(A) and the LRR, this is not a prerequisite for their proprietary specialized training course.

==== Training Facilities ====
Depending on which branch of service offering the Basic Airborne Course, it is held in two military bases:

- Fort Ramon Magsaysay, Nueva Ecija (the garrison of the SFR[A]), and
- Clark Air Base, Pampanga (the garrison of the 710th SPOW)

=== Qualifications ===
The AFP Parachutist Badge is divided into three tiers:

==== Basic Parachutist Badge ====
A soldier must have completed the Basic Airborne Course to earn the lowest tier, the Basic Parachutist Badge. In the process of training, they must have successfully performed five (5) parachute jumps.

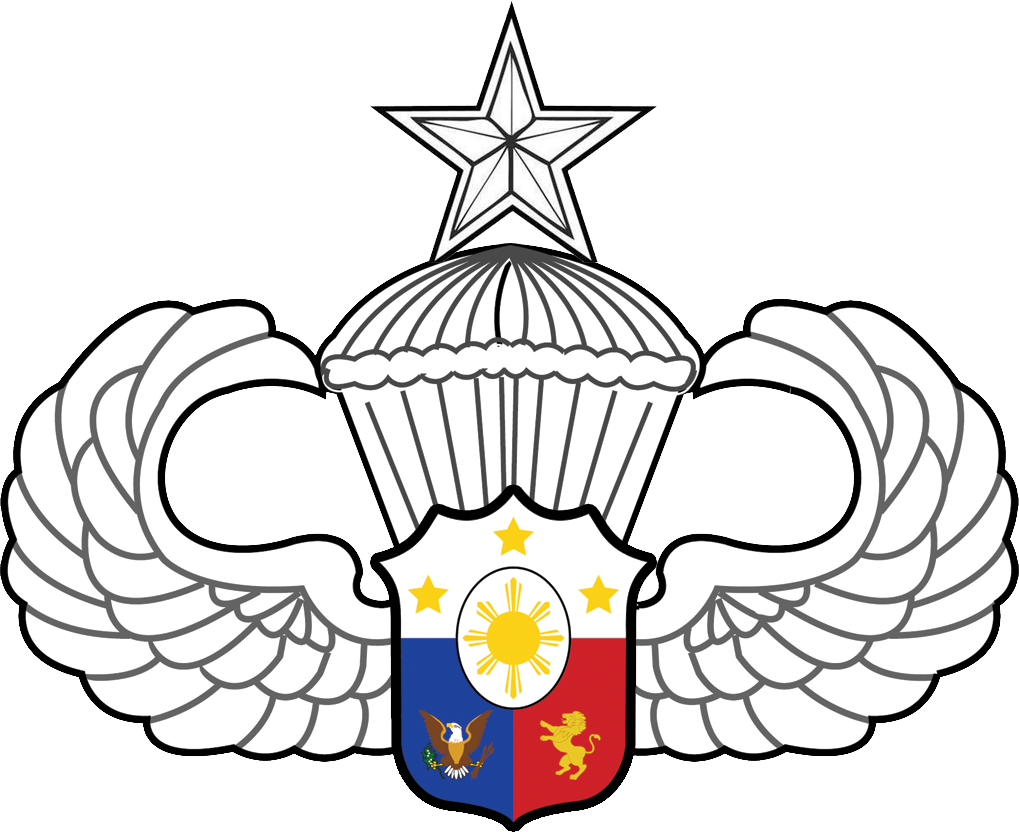
AFP Senior Parachutist Badge

==== Senior Parachutist Badge ====
A soldier is awarded the Senior Parachutist Badge if they are:

- an awardee of the Basic Parachutist Badge,
- have satisfactorily completed an Advanced Airborne Course (Jump Master) as prescribed by General Headquarters, AFP or their Major Service Training Directives, and
- have performed at least 30 parachute jumps:
  - five (5) of which are simulated combat (i.e. tactical jumps) with combat equipment, and
  - at least two (2) night jumps

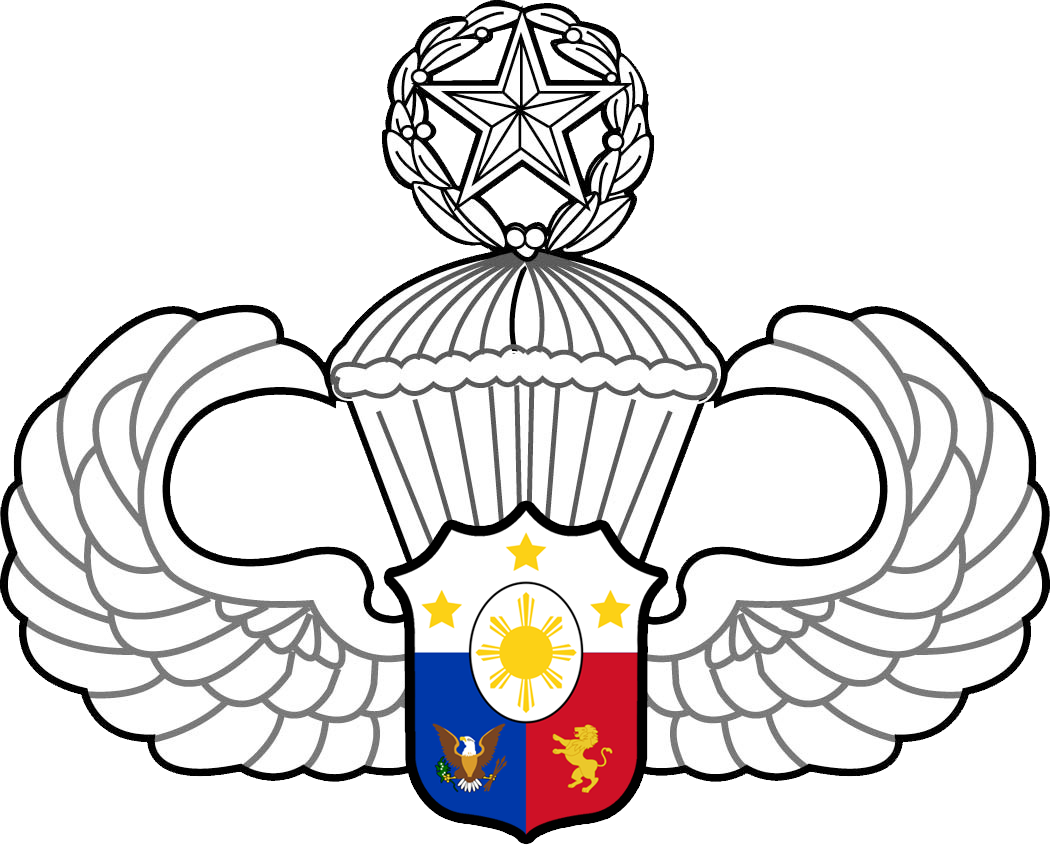
AFP Master Parachutist Badge

==== Master Parachutist Badge ====
A Senior Parachutist is awarded the Master Parachutist Badge if they are:

- an awardee of the Senior Parachutist Badge,
- have satisfactorily completed an Advanced Airborne Course (Jump Master) as prescribed by General Headquarters, AFP or their Major Service Training Directives,
- have performed at least one (1) combat jump as a Jump Master, and
- have performed at least 65 parachute jumps:
  - 20 of which are simulated combat (i.e. tactical jumps) with combat equipment,
  - at least four (4) night jumps, and
  - at least two (2) combat jumps

== Description ==
The AFP Parachutist Badge is somewhat similar to the US Parachutist Badge designed in 1941 by Lieutenant General William P. Yarborough. The general composition of the badge consists of a pair of silver wings curled upward. In the middle of the wings is a fully-deployed round parachute, with its guide lines converging at the bottom middle part, where it is covered by the coat of arms of the Philippines (sans the "REPUBLIKA NG PILIPINAS" scroll), enameled in their respective colors of yellow, white, blue, and red.

The badge is playfully referred to by military personnel as "apá" (transl. [ice cream] cone), attributing to the appearance of the parachute guide lines, and the actual parachute, a scoop of ice cream topped on the cone.

Also patterned from how it is done to its American counterpart, the Basic Parachutist Badge is "upgraded" into the Senior Parachutist Badge by adding a five-pointed silver star on top of the parachute; in turn, it becomes the Master Parachutist Badge by adding a silver laurel wreath wrapped around the star.

=== Manner of Wear ===
The AFP Parachutist Badge is worn as a metallic badge on the dress uniforms, and the General Office Attire (GOA) of all major services.

In combat uniforms (aka. Battle Dress Attire [BDA]), the badge is always worn as an embroidered patch in subdued colors, specifically:

- black embroidery on green fabric (for organic Army personnel wearing the Philippine Army Pattern [PHILARPAT] BDUs used from 2016 to the present),
  - black embroidery on khaki fabric (for organic Army, and Air Force personnel wearing the DPM-derived Battle Dress Attire used from the early 1990s to 2016)
- black embroidery on dark grey fabric (for organic Air Force personnel wearing the PAF Pattern BDU),
- black embroidery on khaki fabric (for SFR(A) operators wearing their Tigerstripe Special Forces Distinctive Uniform [SFDU]),
- red embroidery on black fabric (for FSSR operators wearing their pixelated black Scout Ranger Distinctive Uniform [SRDU]), and
- sky blue embroidery on black fabric (for 710th SPOW operators on all-black combat uniforms unique only to the unit)

LRR operators rarely wear any insignia on their BDUs, considering their status as a tier-one special operations unit.

==== "Airborne" qualification tab ====
All paratroopers, regardless of Badge tier, is also eligible to wear the "AIRBORNE" qualification tab on the wearer's left shoulder sleeve. For organic Army personnel, this is stitched in subdued green and black to conform with the colorway of the PHILARPAT BDU.

SFR(A) operators are given the privilege to wear their tabs in golden yellow, signifying their unit's prestige. Operators from the 710th SPOW wear theirs in sky-blue, to contrast with the other decorations of their black combat uniforms unique only to their unit, while the Scout Rangers have their tabs sewn in red.

== See also ==
- Awards and decorations of the Armed Forces of the Philippines
