= Arturo Ortiz =

Arturo Ortiz may refer to:

- Arturo Ortiz (high jumper) (born 1966), Spanish high jumper
- Arturo Ortiz (footballer) (born 1992), Mexican footballer
- Arturo B. Ortiz (born 1955), Filipino general
