= Special Forces Regiment (Philippines) =

Special Forces Regiment (Airborne) (SFR(A))
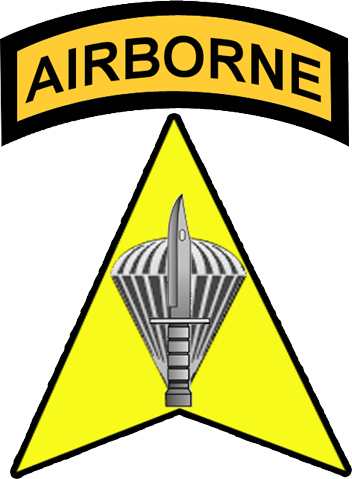
- Special Forces quadratic tab, and Shoulder Sleeve Insignia of the SFR(A), PA
- Active: June 25, 1962 – Present
- Country: Philippines
- Branch: Philippine Army
- Type: Special Operations Forces
- Part of: AFP Joint Special Operations Command
- Garrison/HQ: Fort Ramon Magsaysay, Nueva Ecija
- Nicknames: SF; Silent Professionals
- Mottos: Courage and Determination
- Colors: Golden yellow
- March: Special Forces Song
- Engagements: Anti-Guerilla operations against the NPA; Anti-Guerilla operations against the MILF; Anti-Guerilla operations against MNLF; Moro conflict Zamboanga siege Marawi crisis
- Decorations: Philippine Republic Presidential Unit Citation Badge; Presidential Streamer Award

Commanders
- Current commander: BGEN Eros James M. Uri, PA
- Notable commanders: CPT Fidel V. Ramos PA (INF); COL Arturo B. Ortiz PA (INF) (GSC)

Insignia
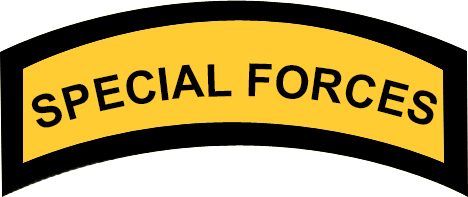
- Special Forces Tab

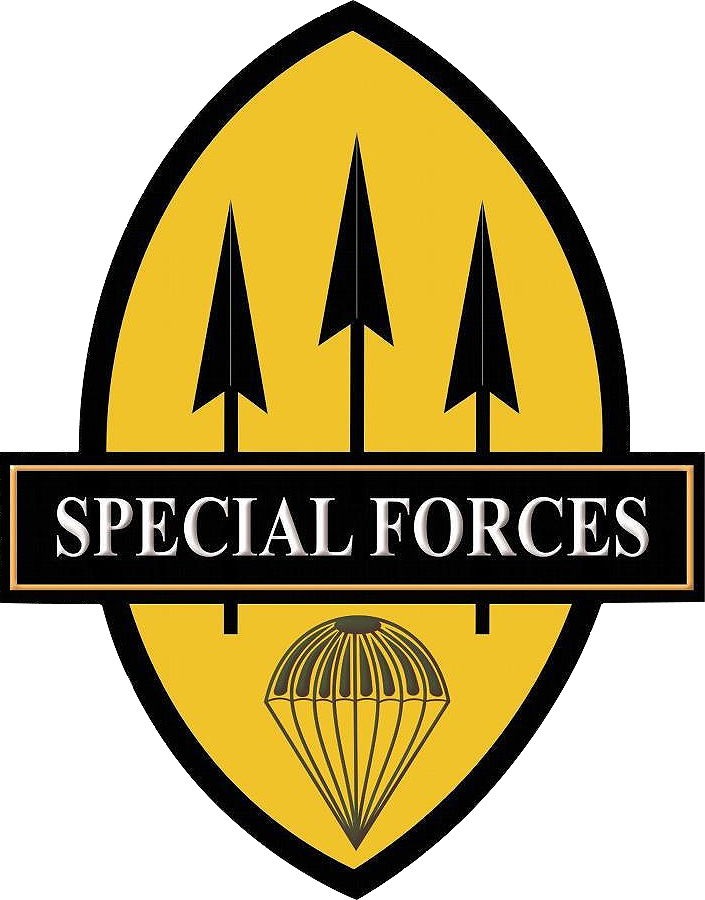
- Special Forces Qualification Badge

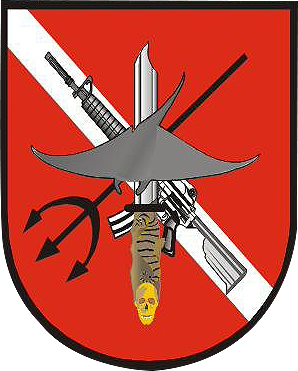
- Shoulder Sleeve Insignia (Riverine)

The Special Forces Regiment (Airborne) is a Special Operations Forces unit of the Philippine Army. The unit is based on and continually trains with its American counterpart, the U.S. Army Special Forces (Green Berets).

It is based at Fort Ramon Magsaysay, Nueva Ecija.

== History ==
In 1960, Captain Fidel V. Ramos, Lieutenant David Abundo Jr., Captain Cesar Batil, and Captain Jose Magno Jr were selected by the Philippine Army to train with American forces at the US Army Special Warfare School, Fort Bragg, North Carolina, taking the Special Forces and Psychological Warfare Courses, in which Captain Ramos and Captain Magno graduated from the latter placing first and second, respectively. They later took Basic Airborne Training under the famed 82nd Airborne Division.

The four American-trained officers were later asked by the AFP to create a committee studying the incorporation of unconventional warfare capabilities within the entire military establishment. With the help of interviews from former World War II guerillas, the committee submitted its study, which was approved and endorsed for implementation by the AFP.

With the collaboration of the AFP, and the Joint United States Military Assistance Group (JUSMAG), the 1st Special Forces Company (Airborne) was established in on June 25, 1962, When the unit was created, around 12 officers and 105 enlisted soldiers formed the unit. They did their early para-drop training in various areas in Metro Manila, specifically Manila Bay, Camp Murphy (now Camp Aguinaldo), and Fort McKinley (now Fort Bonifacio), as well as the site where the Asian Development Bank complex now stands.

Captain Ramos recruited volunteers from all four major service branches of the AFP - the Army, the Navy, the Air Force, and the Philippine Constabulary (now the Philippine National Police). Ramos will later be credited to be the creator of the PNP's own special forces unit, the Special Action Force (SAF). The officer pool was later expanded, as Ramos, et al. will be joined by Fort Bragg and Fort Benning graduates Lieutenant Pete Collado, Lieutenant Tante Quiaoit, Lieutenant Angelo Quedding, and Lieutenant Eduardo Ermita.

The unit encountered manpower issues when SF commandos were sent to Vietnam under the 1 Philippine Civic Action Group - Vietnam (PHILCAG-V), which forced commanders to train new recruits to refill the ranks.

SFR commandos were known to have been actively sent to Mindanao after it was established.

The SFR was responsible for creating the Civilian Home Defense Forces (CHDF), later renamed as the Civilian Armed Forces Geographical Unit (CAFGU).

The unit changed its name from Special Forces to Home Defense Forces in June 1968 to avoid being disbanded when it was revealed that special forces commandos trained Muslim Filipino soldiers for operations in Sabah. At the time, the Home Defense Forces Group consisted of A Teams (Operational Detachment) and B Teams.

In 1970, the HDFG was placed under Task Force Pasig of the Presidential Security Command.

On April 6, 1990, a joint task force consisting of 24 SFR(A) operators from the 606th Special Forces Company, and 36 CAFGU Auxiliaries led by then-Captain Arturo B. Ortiz raided a training camp of the New People's Army in Sitio Manipolun, Pandaran, Murcia, Negros Occidental, where around 200 Communist rebels were garrisoned. With only one wounded from the government side, the task force recorded 84 Communist rebels killed, 8 captured, several wounded, and 105 missing after a two-hour firefight. Due to his exceptional leadership in this battle, Captain Ortiz was awarded the AFP's highest military award, the Medal of Valor. This feat has not been duplicated since in the history of the unit.

A British businessman, Allan Hyrons, 70, and his wife, Wilma, were rescued by the 2nd Special Forces Battalion with support from the 11th Infantry “Alakdan” Division who found them abandoned at the forested areas of Mt. Piahan, the boundary of Barangays Silangkan and Kaha in Parang, Sulu in the morning of 25 November 2019. SFR commandos engaged Abu Sayyaf Group fighters during the operation.

In June 2023, President Bongbong Marcos paid a visit fo the SFR(A) as part of celebrating its 61st anniversary. He mentioned in a speech the adoption of the Riverine Operations Equipment Project (ROEP) to improve the unit's capabilities in riverine operations.

In January 2025, SFR commandos were deployed to Japan to participate in the New Year Jump in Indo-Pacific 2025 with the 1st Airborne Brigade.

In June 2025, the Magno Marker or drop zone Magno monument was unveiled in honor of retired major general Jose P. Magno Jr, who was involved in raising the unit.

== Unit Structure ==
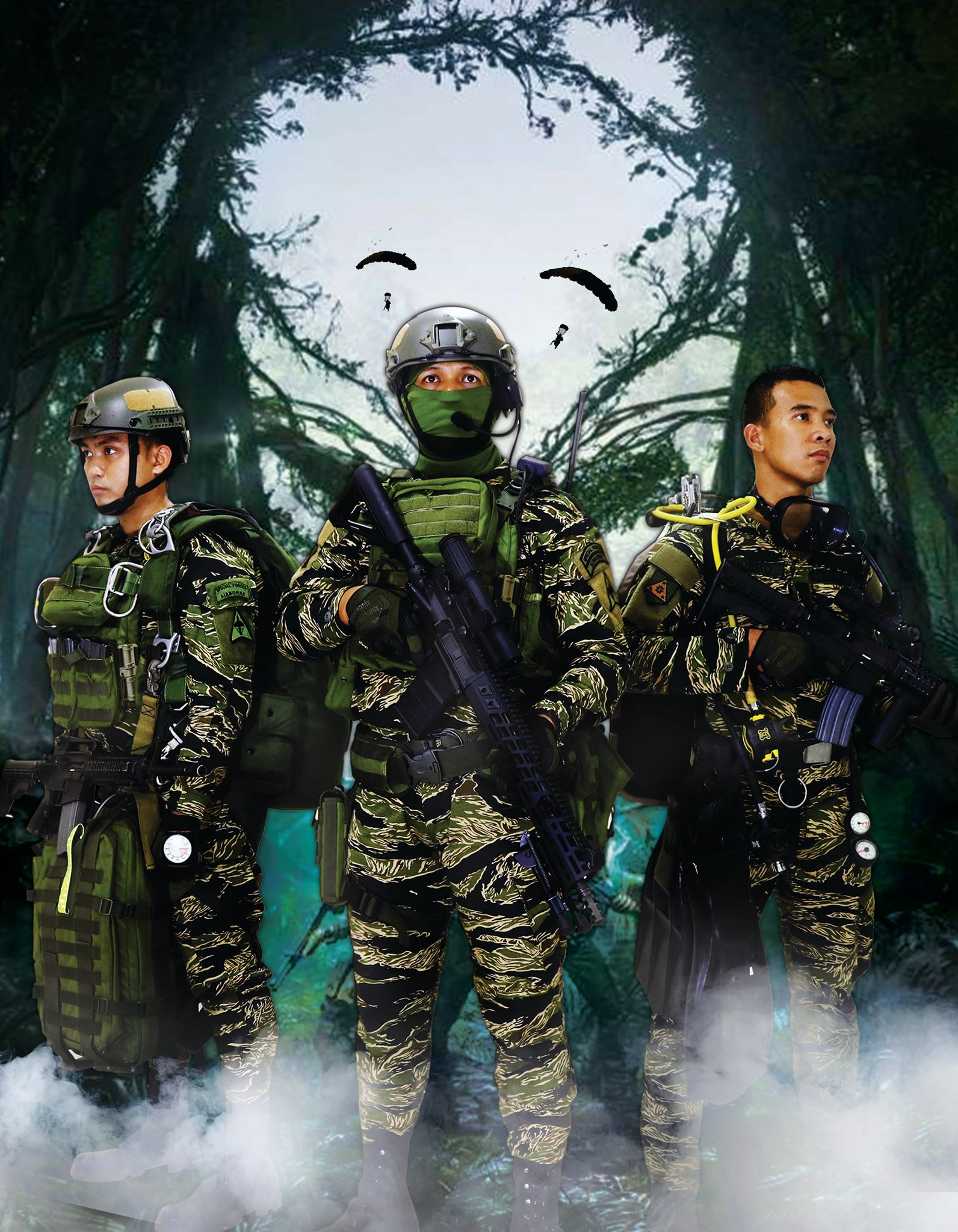
Promotional photo of SFR commandos in various combat gear.

There are currently 5 battalions and 20 companies in SFR(A), namely:

- Headquarters & Headquarters Company
- 1st Special Forces Battalion "Hunter Killer"
  - 1st Special Forces Company
  - 2nd Special Forces Company
  - 3rd Special Forces Company
- 2nd Special Forces Battalion "Sabertooth"
  - 4th Special Forces Company (Mabangis; "Fierce" in Filipino)
  - 5th Special Forces Company
  - 6th Special Forces Company (Sabertooth)
- 3rd Special Forces Battalion "Arrowhead"
  - 7th Special Forces Company (Spartans)
  - 8th Special Forces Company (Dragoons)
  - 9th Special Forces Company (Hounds)
- 4th Special Forces Battalion (Riverine) "Dolphin Warriors"
  - 12th Special Forces Company (Frogman) - Riverine
  - 14th Special Forces Company (Swordfish)
  - 15th Special Forces Company (Conqueror)
  - 16th Special Forces Company (Pax Nuntius; "Heralds of Peace" in Latin)
- 5th Special Forces Battalion "Primus Inter Pares" ("first among equals", in Latin)
  - 10th Special Forces Company (Cobras)
  - 11th Special Forces Company (Stingray)
- 6th Special Forces Battalion "Lionheart"
  - 13th Special Forces Company (Knights)
  - 17th Special Forces Company (Invincible)
  - 18th Special Forces Company (Stingray) - Riverine
  - 19th Special Forces Company (Magnitude)
  - 20th Special Forces Company (Dos Equis; "Two Crosses" in Spanish)
- Special Forces School

== Training ==
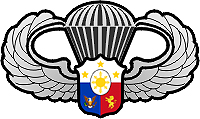
The AFP Parachutist Badge (basic configuration)

Like the Scout Rangers, SFR(A) operators are also highly trained in counterinsurgency. Upon assignment to the Special Forces, soldiers are made to undergo the Basic Airborne Course to earn their Parachutist Badge (colloquially referred to as Apá, transl. cone, pertaining to how a fully deployed parachute looks similar to an ice cream cone).

They will then attend the Special Forces Combat Qualification Course (SFCQC), a 20-week course that equips candidates with a much higher level of combat skills that they can apply in any operational environment. The course will also prepare students to take a higher level of specialization and acquire higher-level special forces skills.

The SFCQC is divided into six (6) modules:, namely:

- Individual Combat Skills Training Phase,
- Internal Security Operations (ISO),
- Team and Section,
- Combat Ground Operations Phase,
- Combat Maneuver Exercise Phase, and
- Test Mission Phase.

Upon graduating SFCQC, they will now undergo the Special Forces Assessment and Selection System (SFASS). It is a three-week course designed to push students to their physical and mental limits. SFASS is the basis for the assessment and selection of candidates that will undergo the next, and final phase of the training, the Special Forces Operations Course (SFOC).

SFOC is an eight-month course that equips each SF operator the basics of Special Forces operations, some of which include:

- Air Operations Training (AOT),
- Unconventional Warfare Training (UWT),
- operations and intelligence,
- combat medicine,
- combat diving,
- communications,
- demolitions, and
- a Survival, Escape, Resistance, and Evasion (SERE) training.

The SFOC also includes a "test mission" which engages them in real combat within a specified area of operation.

Each SFR(A) operator may opt to undergo specialty courses as well after finishing the Special Forces basic course. These include, but is not limited to, training in:

- air assaults,
- anti-guerilla operations,
- close quarter combat (which makes them eligible for the "Colpire Duro" Badge, which can be worn side-by-side with the SFQB),
- counterinsurgency,
- counterintelligence,
- hostage rescue,
- jungle warfare,
- reconnaissance missions, and
- counter-terrorism (if candidates wish to join the Light Reaction Regiment).

=== Foreign training ===
The unit has trained with the Green Berets and the Australian SASR. Others get deployed to Fort Bragg for additional training.

In 2024 and 2025, the SFR(A) participated in exercises with Cambodian special forces units.

== Uniforms and Insignias ==
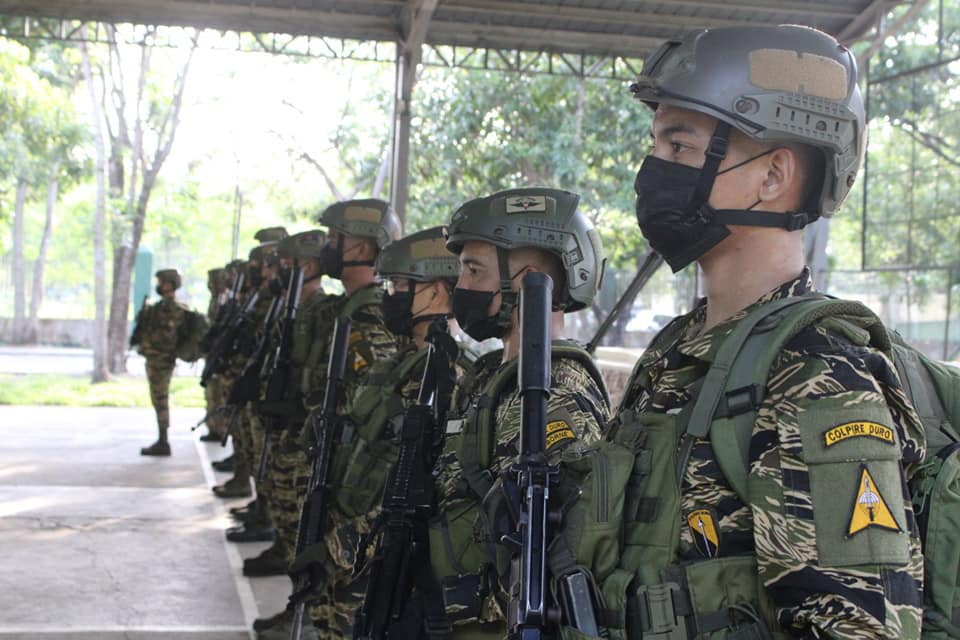
SFR(A) operators in formation, wearing a locally derived Tigerstripe camouflage pattern. Note the operator wearing a "Colpire Duro" tab, which is given to those who completed the Close-Quarters-Combat Course.

Although they wear the Philippine Army Pattern (PHILARPAT) Battle Dress Uniforms by default as members of the Army, SFR(A) operators have preferred wearing other combat uniforms in different camouflage patterns to fit their mission needs. They range from the US Woodland pattern to the vintage DPM-derived Battle Dress Attire (BDA) previously issued to all AFP units for nearly three decades.

The SFR(A) operators use a locally derived Tigerstripe camouflage pattern with a yellow-green colorway, officially called as the Special Forces Distinctive Uniform (SFDU). The usage of such pattern is a nod to their trainers: the American Special Forces units who vigorously used them in clandestine operations during the Vietnam War.

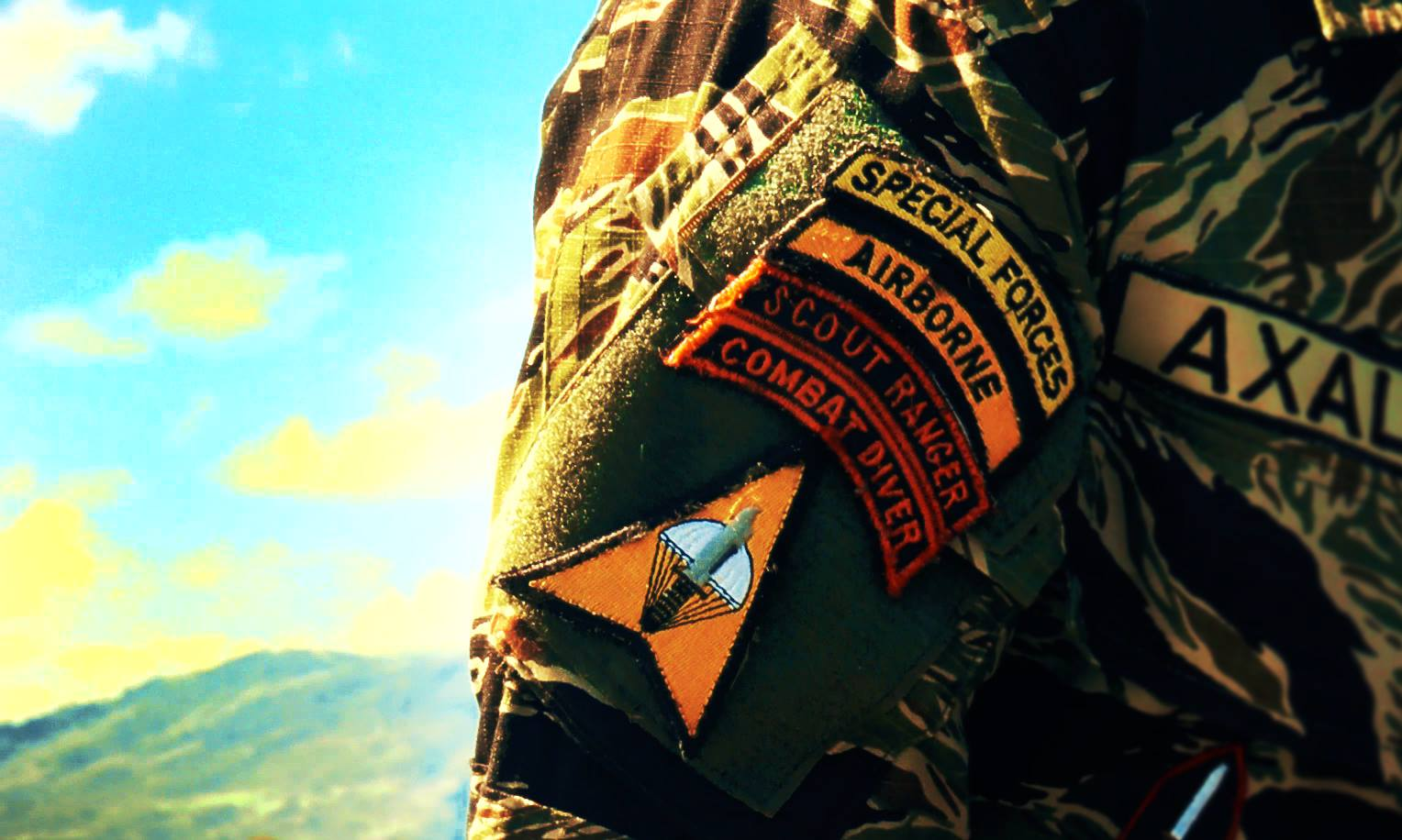
An SFR(A) operator wearing a stack of qualification tabs (Special Forces, Airborne, and Scout Ranger), as well as a Combat Diver qualification tab.

SFR(A) operators are eligible to wear the Special Forces Qualification Badge (SFQB). It comes in form of an oval shield which features three arrows, symbolizing their capability to be sent to fight at sea, air, and land, and a fully deployed parachute, distinguishing themselves to be the only unit in the entire Army establishment to be fully "Airborne-capable". It is either suspended on their General Office Attire (GOA) as a metal pin or stitched on their Battle Dress Uniform (BDU) as an embroidered patch (full-colored or subdued).

SFR(A) operators are also eligible to wear the "Special Forces", and the "Airborne" qualification tabs (similar to the Green Berets) on their BDUs. By default, they are worn in golden yellow color, marking their distinction and privilege among the entire Army establishment, but they can be worn in subdued green color when wearing other uniforms, particularly the PHILARPAT BDUs. When combined with the Scout Ranger tab, this stack of qualification tabs can be considered as the Filipino equivalent of the "tower of power" achieved by their American counterparts.

== Known personnel ==
- GEN Fidel Valdez Ramos, PA, former President of the Philippines; former Chief of Staff of the Armed Forces of the Philippines; dubbed as the "Father of Filipino Special Forces"
- LTGEN Eduardo Ramos Ermita, PA - former Deputy Chief of Staff, Armed Forces of the Philippines; former Executive Secretary, Arroyo Administration; former Representative, Batangas' 1st district
- MGEN Ferdinand B Napuli, PA - former Inspector General, Philippine Army; former Commander, Special Operations Command (Philippine Army)
