= Special Operations Command (Philippine Army) =

Special Operations Command, Philippine Army
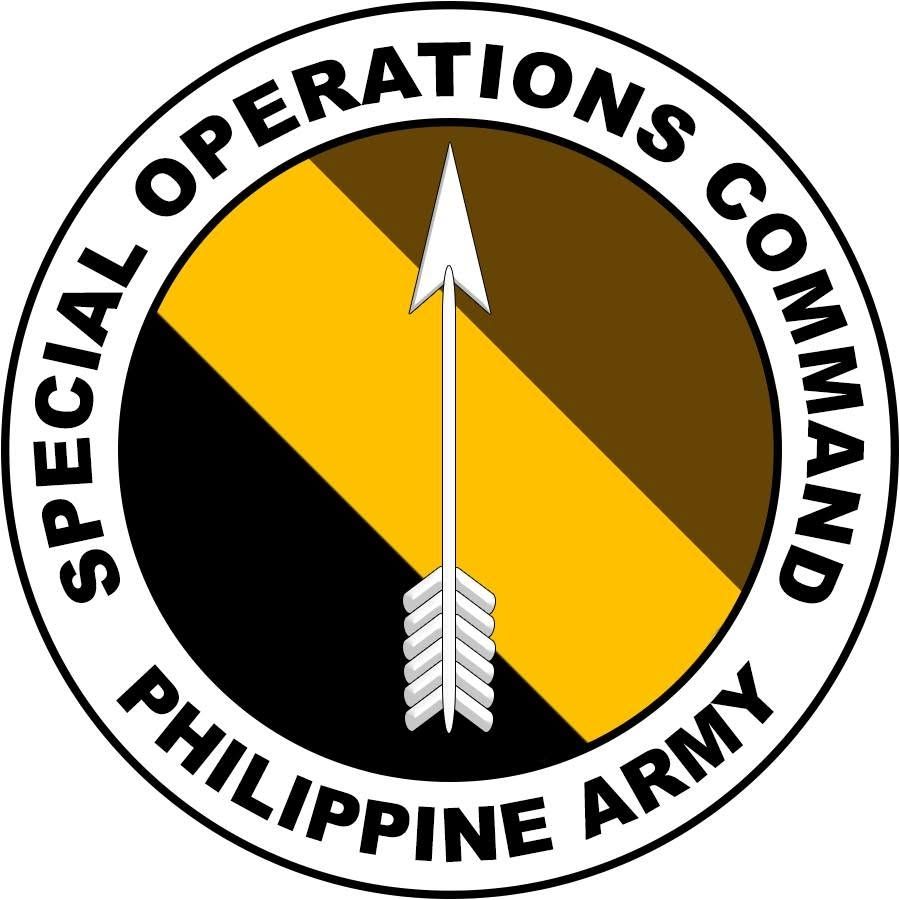
- Active: January 16, 1978 – May 28, 2025 (as AFP Special Operations Command); May 28, 2025 (as Special Operations Command, Philippine Army)
- Country: Philippines
- Branch: Armed Forces of the Philippines
- Type: Special Operations
- Size: Classified
- Garrison/HQ: Fort Ramon Magsaysay, Nueva Ecija
- Nicknames: SOCOM, PA
- Colors: Maroon, Gold and Black
- Anniversaries: January 16
- Decorations: Philippine Republic Presidential Unit Citation Badge; Presidential Streamer Award

Commanders
- Current Commander: MGEN Ferdinand Napuli, PA
- Notable commanders: COL David Abundo Jr., PA; LTGEN Francisco Ariel A Felicidario III, PA; GEN Hermogenes Esperon, PA; GEN Victor Ibrado, PA; LTGEN Arturo Ortiz, PA; LTGEN Danilo M. Pamonag, PA; GEN Dionisio Santiago, PA

The Special Operations Command (SOCOM) of the Philippine Army serves as the unified command of the Armed Forces of the Philippines' largest branch of service for special operations, consisting of three regiments with various specializations. It is responsible for planning, conducting, and supporting special operations missions.

== History ==
SOCOM traces its roots to the Army Special Warfare Brigade (ASWABde) that was organized in January 1978. The ASWABde was the first attempt to unify the specialties of two army units with the most highly trained personnel of the Armed Forces of the Philippines (AFP), the Special Forces and the Scout Rangers, and structure their collective efforts into a highly effective Army unit.

Disbanded in 1986, it was reactivated as the Philippine Army Special Operations Command (PA-SOCOM) in 1995. It has been headquartered in Fort Magsaysay, Nueva Ecija since its reactivation, and was expanded in 2004 to accommodate the then-newly activated Light Reaction Company.

On April 6, 2018, the PA-SOCOM was elevated to an Armed Forces combatant command and became the Armed Forces of the Philippines Special Operations Command (AFPSOCOM). This was done as part of lesson learned by AFP officers in the Zamboanga and Marawi sieges in 2013 and 2017. Its fourth anniversary was celebrated in 2022.

The AFP Joint Special Operations Group (AFP-JSOG) was also disbanded and its officers, enlisted personnel and units was transferred to form the core of the new command. The units transferred from the AFP-JSOG included not just the Light Reaction Regiment, but also the Naval Special Operations Group, now the Naval Special Operations Command (NAVSOCOM), and the 710th Special Operations Wing. The AFP-JSOG K-9 Platoon was also included into the new command.

On May 28, 2025, AFPSOCOM was disbanded, and was reactivated as the Special Operations Command. This came with the simultaneous activation of the Joint Special Operations Command (JSOC).

== Core capabilities ==
SOCOM, PA forces are employed based on the following core capabilities:

- Irregular Warfare
- Direct Action
- International and domestic Counter-terrorist Operations
- HVT Raids
- Humanitarian Assistance/ Disaster Response
- Sabotage
- Security Assistance
- Special Reconnaissance
- Unconventional Warfare

=== Training ===
SOCOM, PA's training regimen comprises various types of training. These training methods are employed to enhance the skills and abilities of the different units under the command.

- Basic Airborne Course
- Basic Naval Special Warfare Course
- Close Quarter Combat Training
- Combat Diver’s Course
- Jumpmaster Course
- Military Freefall Course
- Parachute Packing, Maintenance and Air Delivery Course
- Scout Ranger Target Interdiction Course

== Structure ==
The current SOCOM, PA is organized with the following units:

- Scout Ranger Regiment (FSSR) - Organizes, trains, equips and provides rapidly deployable forces and conducts special operations in support of SOCOM's mission. The unit was modeled after the intelligence-gathering American Alamo Scouts and the combat-ready US Army Rangers. FSSR's core capabilities are direct action, jungle warfare, special reconnaissance, and sniping operations against hostile positions.
- Special Forces Regiment (Airborne) (SFR[A]) - Organizes, trains, equips and provides rapidly deployable forces and conducts unconventional warfare in all types of operational environment in support of SOCOM's mission. They specialize in unconventional warfare, direct action; special reconnaissance; psychological warfare, and mass base operations.
- Light Reaction Regiment (LRR) - The premier counter-terrorist unit of the Philippine Army and the Special operations force of the Armed Forces of the Philippines. It was formerly known as the Light Reaction Battalion and the Light Reaction Company before finally being upgraded into a regimental unit. Due to its specialization in counter-terrorism operations and its formation with the assistance of American advisers, the LRR has been sometimes referred to as the Philippines' Delta Force.
