= Fort Magsaysay =

Military base and airport in Nueva Ecija, Philippines

Fort Ramon Magsaysay
- Fort Magsaysay Military Reservation (FMMR)
- Nueva Ecija, Philippines
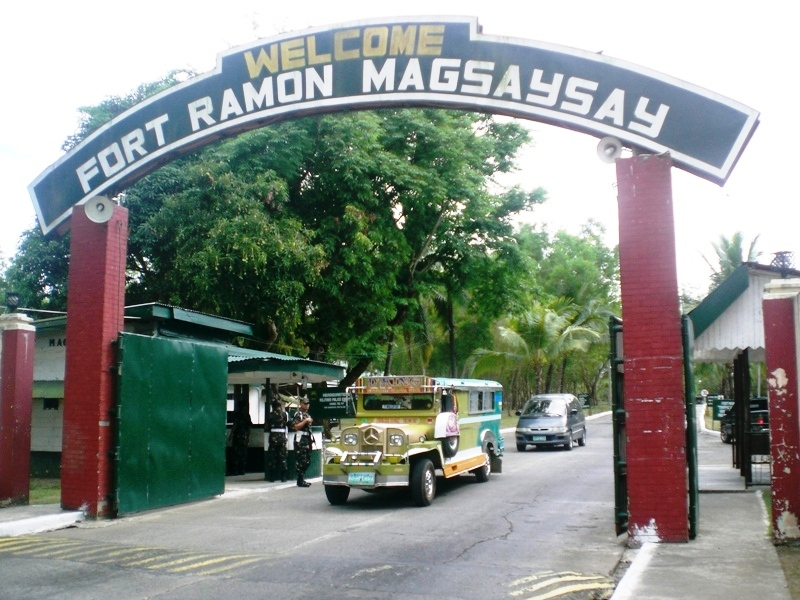
- Fort Ramon Magsaysay entrance gate

Site information
- Type: Military base
- Controlled by: Philippine Army; United States Army (under jurisdiction of Enhanced Defense Cooperation Agreement)

Location
- Location within Nueva Ecija Location within Luzon Location within Philippines
- Coordinates: 15°26′17″N 121°05′28″E

Site history
- Built: December 19, 1955
- In use: 1955–present
- Materials: Concrete, steel

Garrison information
- Garrison: 7th Infantry (Kaugnay) Division, Philippine Army; Aviation (Hiraya) Regiment, Philippine Army; Artillery Regiment, Philippine Army; Armed Forces of the Philippines Joint Special Operations Command (AFPJSOC); Light Reaction Regiment, Philippine Army; Special Forces Regiment (Airborne), Philippine Army; 99th Infantry “Hinalung” Battalion, Philippine Army; 1st Brigade Combat Team, Philippine Army

Fort Ramon Magsaysay, also known as the Fort Magsaysay Military Reservation (FMMR) and sometimes shortened to Fort Mag, is the largest military reservation in the Philippines and serves as a key training area for the Armed Forces of the Philippines (AFP). Fort Magsaysay spans the provinces of Nueva Ecija and Aurora, encompassing the city of Palayan and the municipalities of Santa Rosa, General Tinio, Laur, and Dingalan.

== History ==
=== Creation ===
On December 10, 1955, President Ramon Magsaysay enacted the 73,000 hectares (180,000 acres) base centered in Palayan City. The reservation covers the municipalities of Papaya (now General Tinio), Santa Rosa and Laur, all of the province of Nueva Ecija and portion of Aurora province. The reservation is used for military training and live-fire exercises.

In its infancy, Fort Magsaysay hosted the Army Training Command (ATC), which provided basic training for enlisted personnel and officers and advanced training in some specialties such as infantry and artillery.

As one of the main training grounds of the Philippine Army, Fort Magsaysay hosted the Training and Doctrine Command (TRADOC, now the Training Command (TRACOM)) a couple of times in its history. Currently, TRACOM is located in Camp O'Donnell, but majority of the field exercises are conducted in Fort Magsaysay.

=== Martial law ===
During martial law, Senators Jose W. Diokno and Ninoy Aquino were incarcerated in Fort Magsaysay for exactly thirty days after President Ferdinand Marcos declared martial law on September 21, 1972. It is now called the Aquino-Diokno Memorial and is home to the AFP Center for Human Rights.

=== Recent history ===
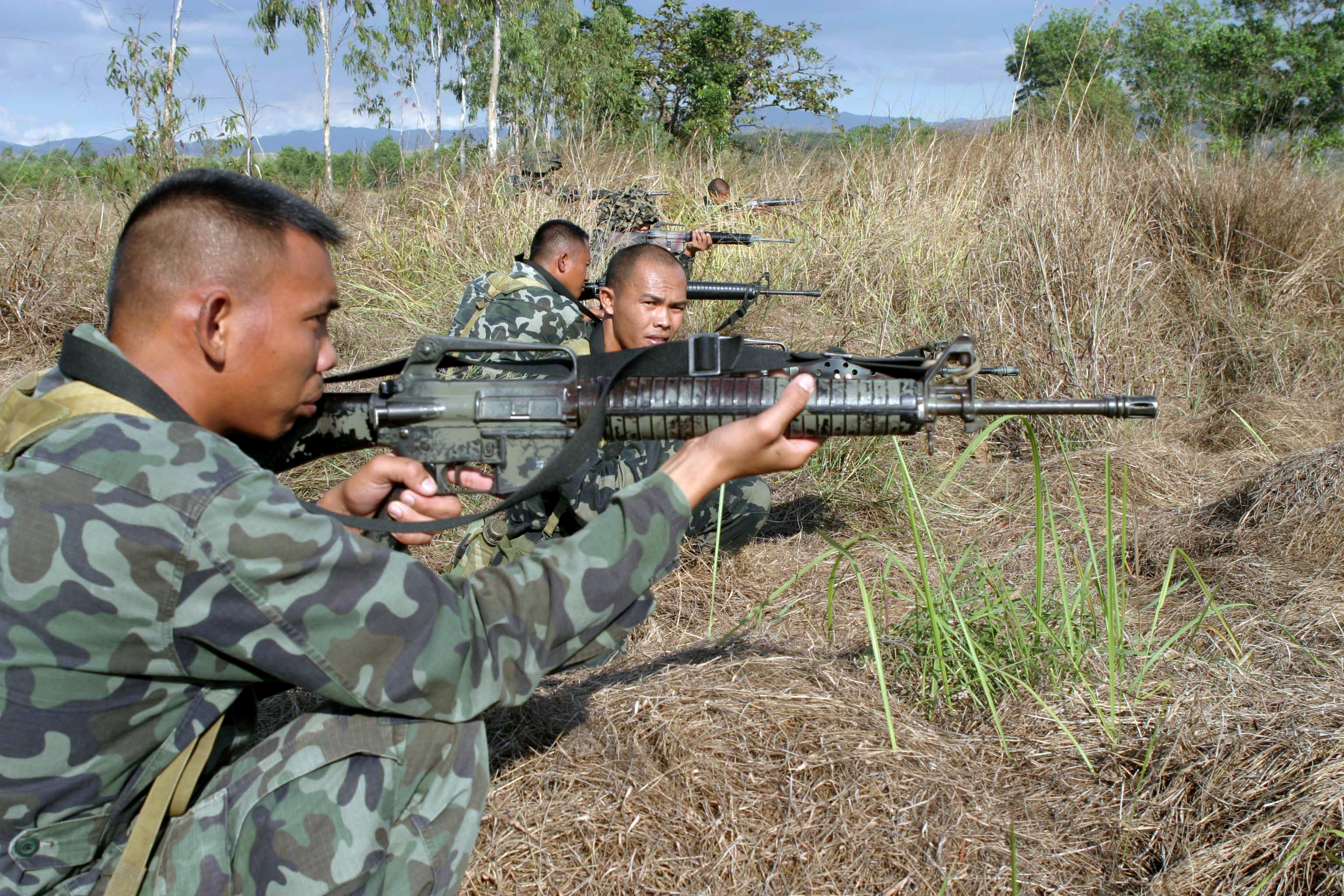
Philippine Marines armed with 5.56 mm M16A1 rifles set up an assault line, while participating in Tactical Recovery of Aircraft and Personnel (TRAP) training at Fort Magsaysay, Nueva Ecija during Exercise BALIKATAN 2004.

In 1991, Mount Pinatubo's eruption led to the Philippine government to relocate some of the residents of the volcano and Fort Magsaysay was one of the relocation sites. Almost two decades later, the Philippine Army remains in conflict with tenant farmers, as the latter have been ordered evicted from the military reservation.

Fort Magsaysay's vast tracts of land has time and again attracted a number of claimants, without escaping controversy. In some occasions, illegal loggers have found their way into the reservation.

On September 21, 2012, President Benigno Aquino III led the observance of the 40th anniversary of Martial Law under Ferdinand Marcos by opening the Aquino-Diokno Memorial, the Armed Forces of the Philippines (AFP) Center for Human Rights Dialogue inside Fort Magsaysay and the museum-replica of the 1973 detention facility of Ninoy (Codenamed: Alpha) and Diokno (Codenamed: Delta).

At present, Fort Magsaysay, along with the Crow Valley Range Complex in Tarlac, provides the Armed Forces of the Philippines and allied nations ample training grounds in modern jungle warfare in large unit formation. The RP-US 2009 Balikatan exercises commenced at Fort Magsaysay. The fort is one of the five bases where US troops and supplies could be stationed under a security deal with the Philippine and US governments.

Fort Magsaysay currently hosts the Mega Drug Abuse Treatment and Rehabilitation Center, which was donated by Chinese businessman Huang Rulun after the election of President Rodrigo Duterte in 2016. Portable modular buildings were used, with the DND allocating the land within Fort Magsaysay for the project. The rehab center which is designed to house 10,000 patients has received much criticism from the opposition and various sectors of society. By 2017, it had only received 311 patients. The Department of Health in July 2020 used the Mega Rehab Center as a quarantine facility for the COVID-19 pandemic.

In 2020, Fort Magsaysay received a budget of P273 million from the DND–DPWH Convergence Program on Strengthening and Expanding Military Readiness for National Security and Development otherwise known as Tatag ng Imprastraktura para sa Kapayapaan at Seguridad (TIKAS) (Stable Infrastructure for Peace and Security) program. This entails constructions, renovation, and refurbishment of facilities in military camps around the country. The project includes construction of a new headquarters for the 7th Infantry Division, a 7.3 km road, barracks and transient facilities for the Light Reaction Regiment and Special Forces units, as well as hangar facilities for the Army Aviation Battalion.

== Description ==
Fort Magsaysay can be reached through the Bangad–Fort Magsaysay Road or through the Santa Rosa–Fort Magsaysay Road.

The original 73,000-hectare military reservation has been reduced to 35,000 hectares after seven presidential proclamations. Despite this reduction, the sprawling base reaches all the way to the Pacific Ocean, over the Sierra Madre Mountains, with 12 kilometers of coastline.

Fort Magsaysay is also the only Philippine Army base that boast its own runway, apron, aircraft maintenance, and air control facilities. The Philippine Army operates Cessna CE172 Skyhawk and CE421 from Fort Magsaysay.

Fort Magsaysay also features a rest and recreation (R&R) facility known as the Pahingahan Complex (from the Filipino word pahingahan, meaning "a place of rest"). The complex is situated on the shores of a man-made lake within the base and offers recreational activities such as kayaking and hiking on nearby trails. Located in northwestern Luzon, near Manila, Fort Magsaysay is surrounded by agricultural areas that produce tropical fruits, rice, and other vegetation. Livestock, including chickens—some of which are used in cockfighting—are also present and contribute to the base’s food supply. Common modes of transportation in the area include jeepneys, tricycles, motor vehicles, and carabaos. The facility also serves as a hub for rest and recreational activities for military personnel.

== Modernization ==
The Department of National Defense's plans to expand and modernize the Philippine Army, Fort Magsaysay has been designated as the AFP's National Training Center (NTC). The NTC's mission is to upgrade and train at battalion level. In a period of 6 years, more than 72 Army Battalions and 12 Marine Battalions have gone through the NTC's program at Fort Magsaysay.

The fort acquired a fleet of trucks and ambulances worth P98.3 million on May 23, 2016.

== Facilities ==
Fort Magsaysay Airfield
- IATA: none; ICAO: RPLV

Summary
- Airport type: Military
- Operator: Philippine Army
- Location: Fort Ramon Magsaysay, Nueva Ecija, Philippines
- Elevation AMSL: 75.85 m (248.9 ft)
- Coordinates: 15°26′02″N 121°05′14″E

Map
- Location within Nueva Ecija Location within Luzon Location within Philippines

Runways
Direction	Length		Surface
Direction	m	ft	Surface
23L/05R	1,600	5,249	Asphalt

- Fort Magsaysay Airfield (ICAO: RPLV)
- Fort Magsaysay Army Station Hospital (FMASH)
- 650 m firing range
- 500 m firing range
- 150 m firing range
- 100 m firing range
- 1.6 km runway & apron
- Officer's Club
- Batis
- Church
- Headquarters
- Stockade
- Army Store
- R&R Facilities (Pahingahan Complex)
- Aquino Diokno Shrine
- Golf Course
- Pahingahan Dam
- Gym
- AFP Transient Facilities

== Gallery ==
Fort Magsaysay
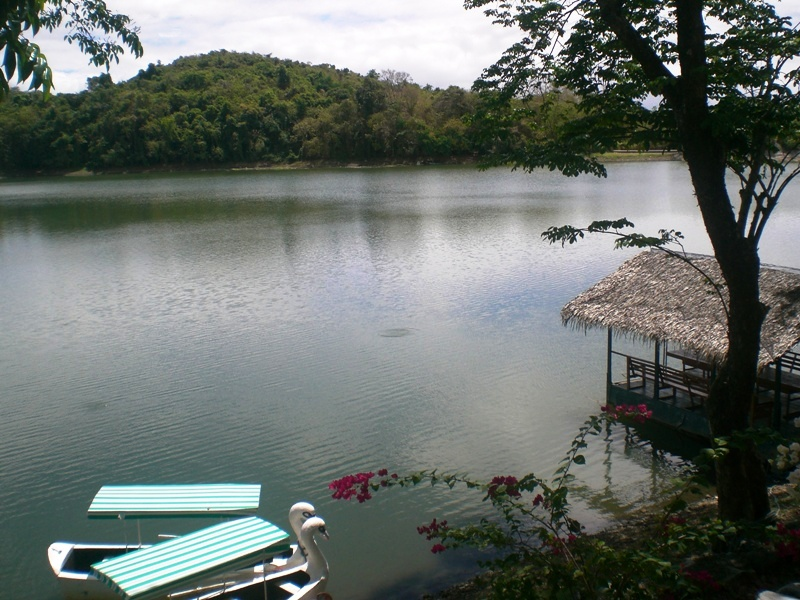
Man-made lake in Fort Magsaysay.

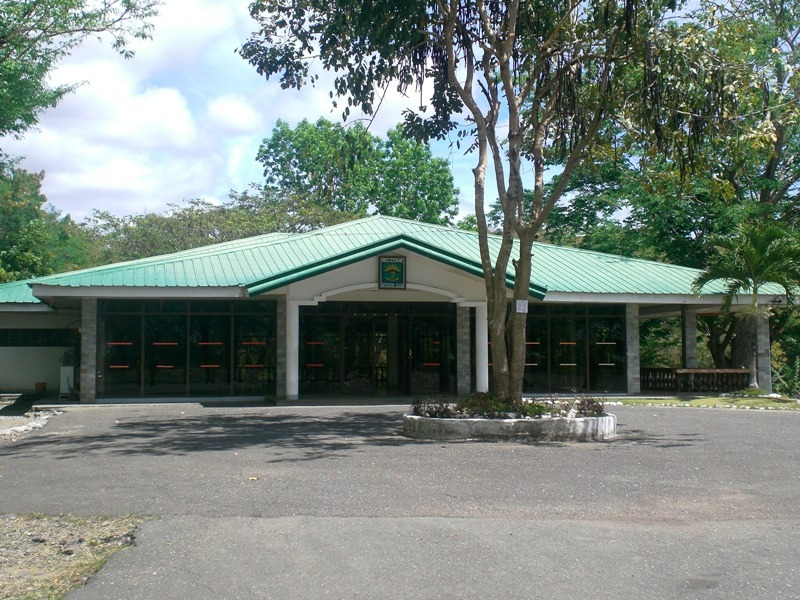
Facility building in Fort Magsaysay.

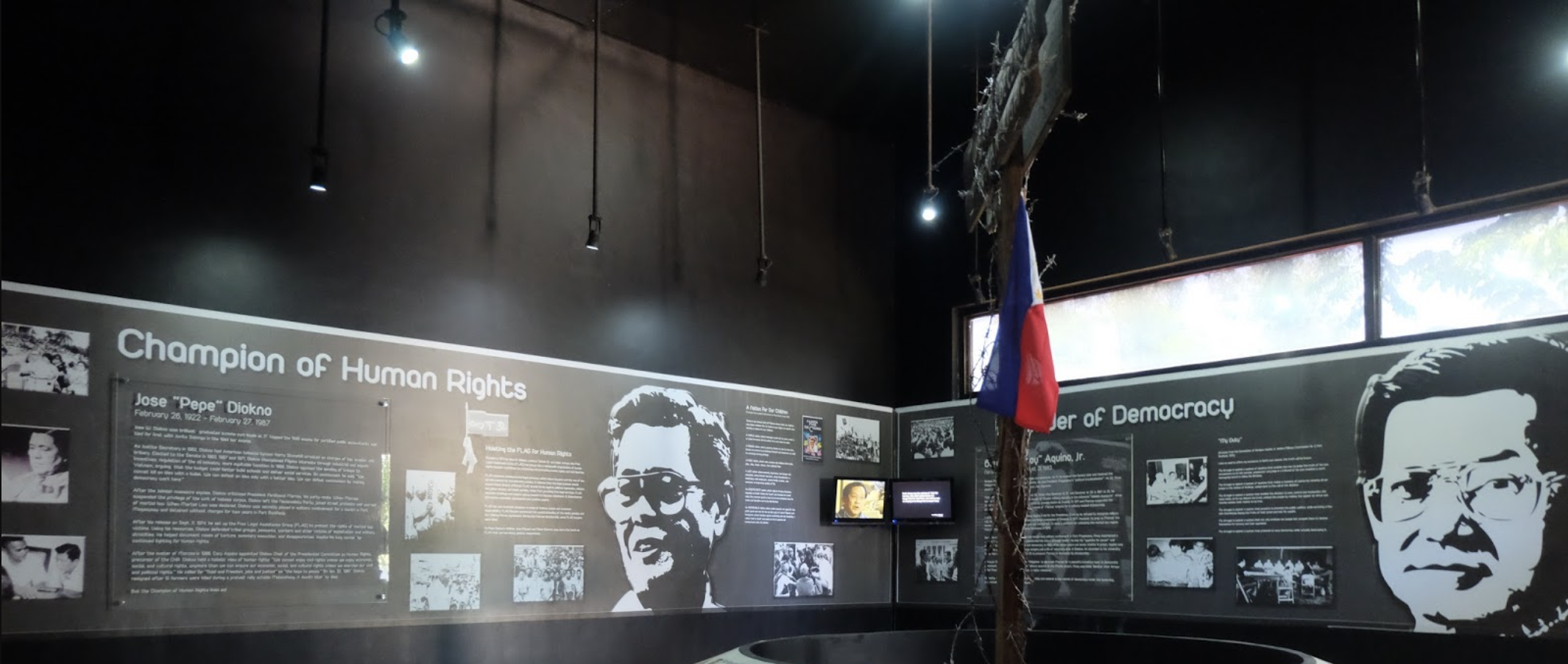
Aquino-Diokno Memorial

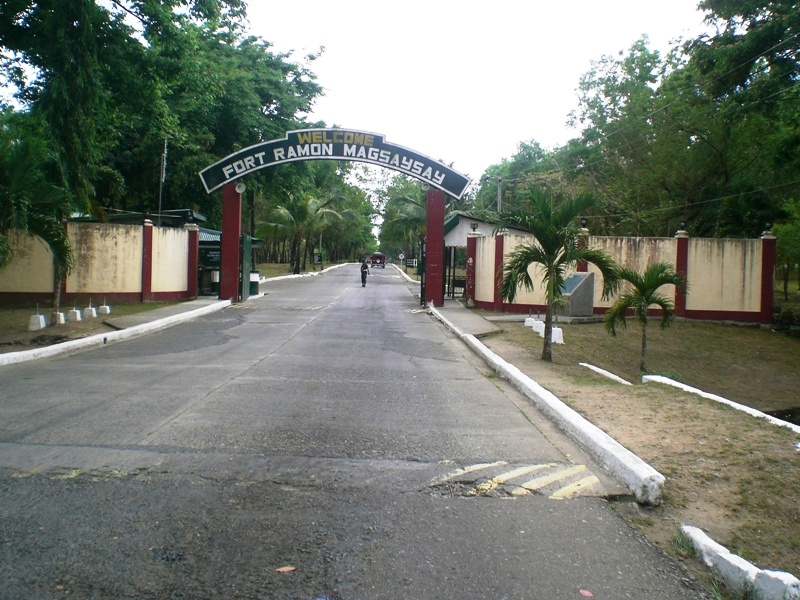
Facade of Fort Magsaysay.

== See also ==
- Crow Valley Range Complex
