= Arturo B. Ortiz =

Filipino lieutenant general

- Born: 13 November 1955 (age 70); Bautista, Pangasinan
- Military career
- Allegiance: Philippines
- Branch: Philippine Army
- Service years: 1979-2011
- Rank: Lieutenant General
- Service number: 0-7920
- Conflicts: Communist rebellion in the Philippines
- Awards: Philippine Medal of Valor; Military Merit Medal; Distinguished Service Star

Arturo B. Ortiz (born 13 November 1955) is a retired Filipino Lieutenant general who was the Commanding General of the Philippine Army from 2010 to 2011. He is a recipient of the Philippine Medal of Valor (the Philippine equivalent of the Medal of Honor), a four-time recipient of Distinguished Service Star and Bronze Cross Medals. Also he is a recipient of 21 Military Merit Medals and three Gold Cross medals.

== Biography ==
Ortiz was born in Bautista, Pangasinan. He graduated in from the Philippine Military Academy in 1979. In 1980 and 1981 he served at Special Warfare Brigade where he took basic courses in Airborne and Special Forces. He also took basic Armor Officer and civil-military operations course at the Training Command, Philippine Army four years later. A year later, he took courses in Civil Affairs, Instructor training, and Officer Qualification Record for becoming a member of Special Forces. All of those courses were taken in Fort Bragg, North Carolina. For his heroic actions on April 6, 1990, in a raid against the Communist New People's Army in Negros Occidental, he was awarded the Philippine Medal of Valor by President Corazon Aquino. In 1987, 1993 and 2006 he took Close quarter battle course for becoming a jumpmaster and during the same years took scuba diving course, all of which were taken in Special Forces School. Later on, he took General Staff course at Fort Leavenworth, Kansas in 2000. He was the 12th commander of the Special Operations Command where he served from November 3, 2008, to July 23, 2010. He went on to serve as the 53rd Commanding General of the Philippine Army

=== Medal of Valor citation ===
"By direction of the President, pursuant to paragraph 1-6a, Section II, Chapter 1, AFP Regulations G131-053, General Headquarters, Armed Forces of the Philippines, dated 1 July 1986, the MEDAL FOR VALOR is hereby awarded to:

CAPTAIN ARTURO B ORTIZ 0-9713
Philippine Army

"For acts of conspicuous courage, gallantry and intrepidity at the risk of life above beyond the call of duty during a fierce firefight with about 200 numerically superior rebels at Sitio Manipolun, Pandaran, Murcia, Negros Occidental on 6 April 1990, while serving as Commander of five joint teams of the 606th Special Forces Company, Philippine Army and elements of the Citizens Armed Forces Geographical Units.

Upon receiving information on the presence of a large communist terrorist camp in the hinterland of Murcia, CAPT ORTIZ initiated and planned a raid mission on the place. Under cover of darkness, he led his troops in a grueling 11-hour cross-country foot march and dangerously scaled a 1,000 foot steep cliff to infiltrate enemy territory. Faced with a formidable rebel force, outnumbering his troops by 4:1 ratio and compounded by a grim prospect that an enemy counterattack would force his troops to back off through the same fatally dangerous cliff where air or artillery fire support and troops in creeping to as close as 10 meters from the enemy, cautiously avoiding booby traps and claymore mines.

As he launched the surprise attack, the stunned rebels scampered for cover and fought back from their bunkers, behind tree trunks and felled trees, but he systematically orchestrated the momentum of the attack by sustained, accurate and controlled fires and maneuver. Disregarding personal safety, he darted from one team to another, encouraging his troops, directing their lines of fire and instructing them to spare the women and children huddled under a tree and instructed them to lie prone to avoid being hit. Leading his men in hot pursuit against the scampering rebels, the troops overwhelmed the enemy and completely overran the 28-hut NPA training camp.

The 2-hour gun battle resulted in 84 terrorist killed with 22 dead bodies counted, including 17 recovered on site, 8 captured, several others wounded, and 105 missing, as reported by the Negros Regional Party Committee monitored thru Negros Island command's Radio Monitoring System. Only one was wounded on the government side. Recovered from the enemy were 33 assorted firearms, 7 hand grenades 20 rifle grenades, 5 ICOM radios, 8 claymore mines, 30 electric blasting caps, explosives thousands of ammunition, surgical and medical equipment, voluminous documents, P 70,000.00 cash money and others. By the deploy of exceptional courage and a high degree of leadership. CAPTAIN ORTIZ distinguished himself in the field of combat in keeping with the highest tradition of the Armed Forces of the Philippines."

== Awards in military service ==
- Medal of Valor
- Philippine Republic Presidential Unit Citation
- Martial Law Unit Citation
- People Power I Unit Citation
- People Power II Unit Citation
- 4 Distinguished Service Stars
- 3 Gold Cross Medals
- 4 Bronze Cross Medal
- Officer, Philippine Legion of Honor
- 21 Military Merit Medals
- Military Commendation Medals
- Military Civic Action Medal
- Long Service Medal
- Anti-dissidence Campaign Medal
- Luzon Anti-Dissidence Campaign Medal
- Visayas Anti-Dissidence Campaign Medal
- Mindanao Anti-Dissidence Campaign Medal
- Disaster Relief and Rehabilitation Operations Ribbon
- Combat Commander's Badge
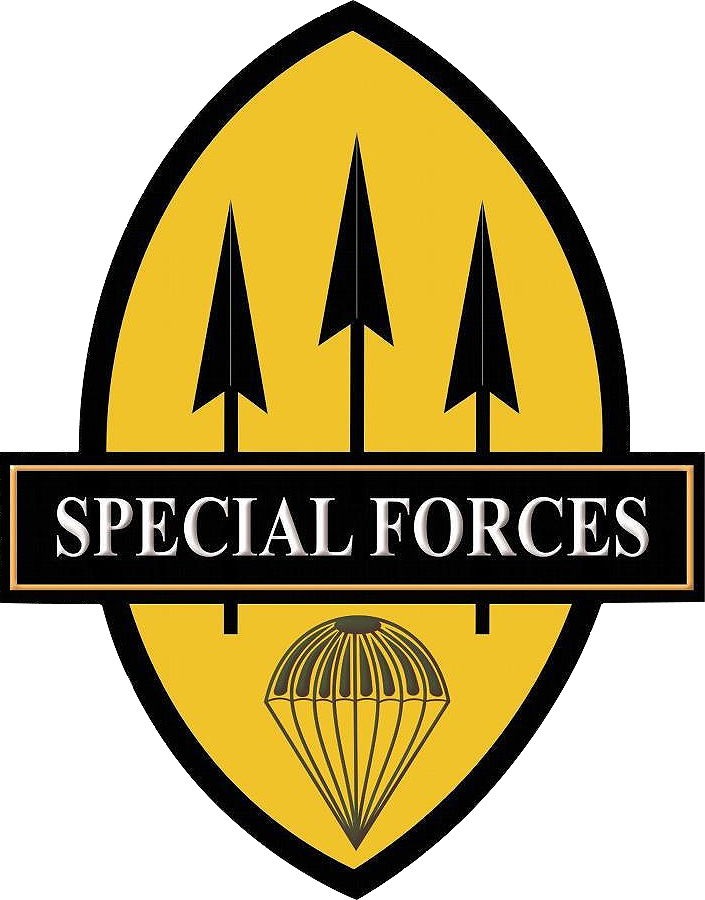
- Special Forces Qualification Badge
- AFP Parachutist Badge
- Philippine Army Command and General Staff Course Badge
- PMA Cavalier Award - for outstanding performance in army operations (1991)
- PMAAAI Alumni Association Award (1996)

== Personal life ==
He is married to Cynthia C. Abogado, a native of Cagayan de Oro, and they have 7 sons.
