= Philippine Navy Special Warfare Force =

Military unit of the Philippines Navy

Special Warfare Force
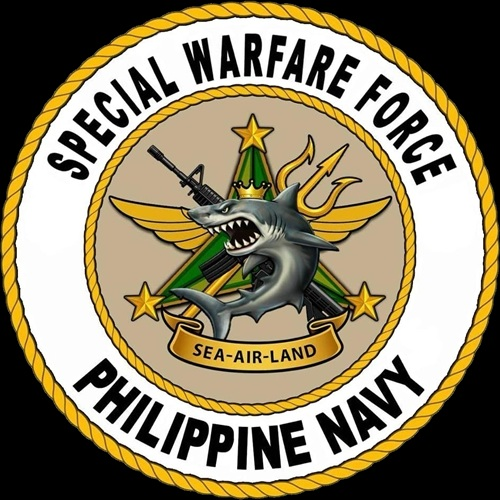
- Unit Insignia (sewn on chest pocket of the operator's BDU)
- Active: November 5, 1956 - Present
- Country: Philippines
- Branch: Philippine Navy
- Type: Special Operations Forces
- Garrison/HQ: Naval Base Heracleo Alano, Sangley Point, Cavite City, Province of Cavite
- Nicknames: Palaka (Frog) (stands for PAndagat, LAngit, at KAti; Sea, Air, Land)
- Colors: Sand Brown
- Mascots: Shark, Frog
- Anniversaries: November 5
- Engagements: Communist Insurgencies; Islamic Insurgencies; Battle of Zamboanga; Anti-guerrilla operations against NPA; Anti-guerrilla operations against MILF; Moro conflict; Operation Black Archer (joint op with U.S. Navy SEALs); War on ISIL; Security for APEC Philippines 2015; Operation Enduring Freedom: Philippines; Anti-guerrilla operations against Abu Sayyaf; Anti-guerrilla operations against ISIL; War on ISIL: 2017 Marawi siege; Operations in Lake Lanao; Joint Operation Haribon (joint operations with the Light Reaction Regiment, Philippine Army)
- Decorations: Philippine Republic Presidential Unit Citation Badge; Presidential Streamer Award

Commanders
- Current commander: COMMO Jim P Razo, PN

The Special Warfare Force (SWF) is a separate type command of the Philippine Navy, which specializes in special operations, sabotage, psychological and unconventional warfare, and direct action. They are heavily influenced by the United States Navy SEALs. SWF is headquartered at Naval Base Heracleo Alano Sangley Point, Cavite City. It has eleven units located across the Philippines, from Naval Operating Base San Vicente at Santa Ana, Cagayan in the north, to Naval Station Zamboanga in the south.

== History ==
The predecessor unit to the SWF is the Underwater Operations Team (UOT), was activated on 5 November 1956 as a special operations unit of the Philippine Navy. Patterned after the US Navy Underwater Demolition Teams and the Italian Decima Flottiglia MAS with modifications for Philippine conditions, the UOT was charged with conducting underwater operations in waterways, beach areas and harbors in support of Philippine naval operations. These operations included underwater explosive disposal, mine countermeasures, salvage and search and rescue. In 1959, the UOT was expanded and redesignated the Underwater Operations Unit (UOU), then as the Underwater Operations Group (UOG).

The UOG was then renamed Special Warfare Group (SWG) in 1983, then Naval Special Warfare Group (NSWG/PN SWAG), and later on as the Naval Special Operations Group (NAVSOG) on May 30, 2005.

On 7 July 2020, the unit became the Naval Special Operations Command (NAVSOCOM) when it was separated from the Philippine Fleet. Among the changes included the name change from the Naval Diving Unit (NDU) to the Naval Diving Group (NDG).

On August 20, 2022, the Philippine Navy made NAVSOCOM a regular combat support command with Commodore Alfonspin Tumanda Jr as the commanding officer.

On June 19, 2024, a SEAL operator lost his thumb during fights with Chinese Coast Guard officers after their ships conducted an interception operation at the Second Thomas Shoal.

On August 8, 2025, NAVSOCOM changed its name to the Naval Special Warfare Force (NSWF). It later dropped the "Naval" from its nomenclature to be simply called the Special Warfare Force (SWF) to comply with the Philippine Navy's Comprehensive Archipelagic Defense Concept and modernization strategy by streamlining the names of its commands, and units due to its shift of focus to external territorial defense.

== Role ==
The unit specializes in Sea (Combat Diving, VBSS, Sea to Land) Air (Combat Parachuting HALO/HAHO, Air to Sea, Air to Land) Land (Jungle and Urban Warfare) (SEAL) operations ranging from reconnaissance, close combat, demolition, intelligence and underwater operations in support of overall naval operations.

The unit gained prominence in a number of counter-terrorism operations, most notably against the Abu Sayyaf Group and is known for its highly demanding physical training program which is based on the United States Navy SEAL program.

=== Training ===
The SWF, PN's training program is known as Basic Naval Special Operations Course (BNSOC). The program is physically and mentally demanding and is regarded as one of the toughest military selection programs around the world. Candidates have to swim 3 kilometers and run 10 kilometers every day.

Furthermore, they must swim 14.6 nautical miles from Roxas Boulevard in Manila to Sangley Point, Cavite City without any rest. They also undergo "Hell Week", considered as the most demanding week of BNSOC training. Candidates have to carry out demanding physical team events with their boat crews without any sleep at all for an entire week. In one BNSOC class, only 21 students remained from 79 applicants who originally started the BNSOC training program. These are only the common and basic training phases of BNSOC, with further evolutions of the training (including interrogation resistance) remaining highly classified.

Under Filipino law, women can apply to become SEALs, but thus far none have.

On November 16, 2025, SWF, PN formally launched its Naval Special Warfare Reservist Orientation Training, allowing Navy Reservists to experience the same rigid training that the SWF operators undergo, and to serve as complementary forces (force multipliers) for the entire Navy organization. Notable inaugural Naval Special Warfare Reservists include actor and musician PO2 Jong Cuenco, and radio DJ PO2 Megan Sebastian-Du.

== United States influence ==
There are similarities between the SWF, PN, and the U.S. Naval Special Warfare Command. SWF, PN's operators are trained and operate in a manner similar to, and with the U.S. Navy SEALs. They also wear a qualification badge that is similar to the "Trident" badge of their U.S. Navy counterparts, which the SWF operators can also earn and wear simultaneously.

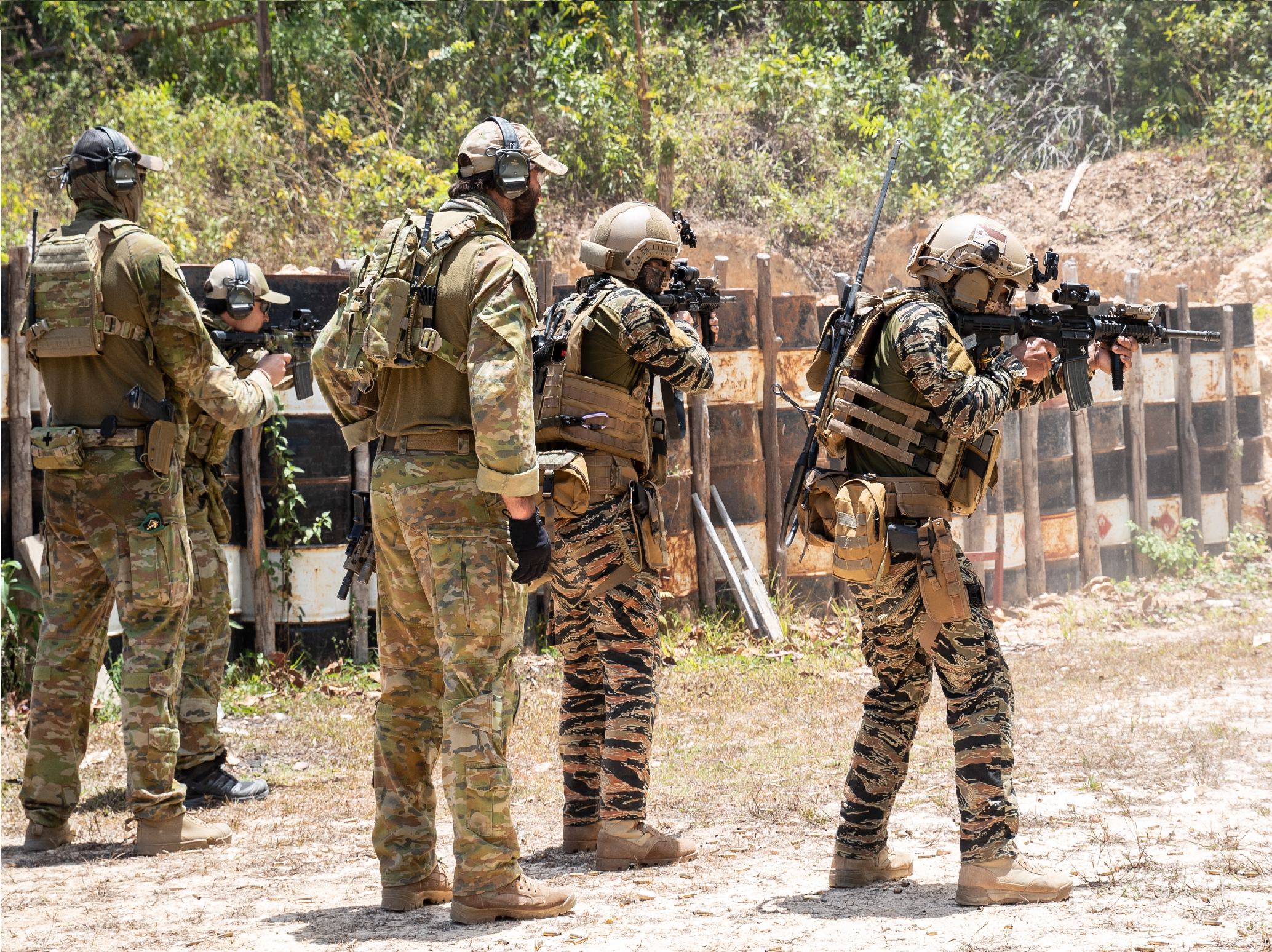
SWF, PN (then NAVSOCOM) Operators (Aiming) with counterparts from Australian Special Forces during Balikatan 2019

The Filipino counterpart of the U.S. counterterrorist United States Naval Special Warfare Development Group (DEVGRU; SEAL Team 6) is the Philippine Naval Special Reaction Group (SRG), which operates under the direction of Naval Intelligence.

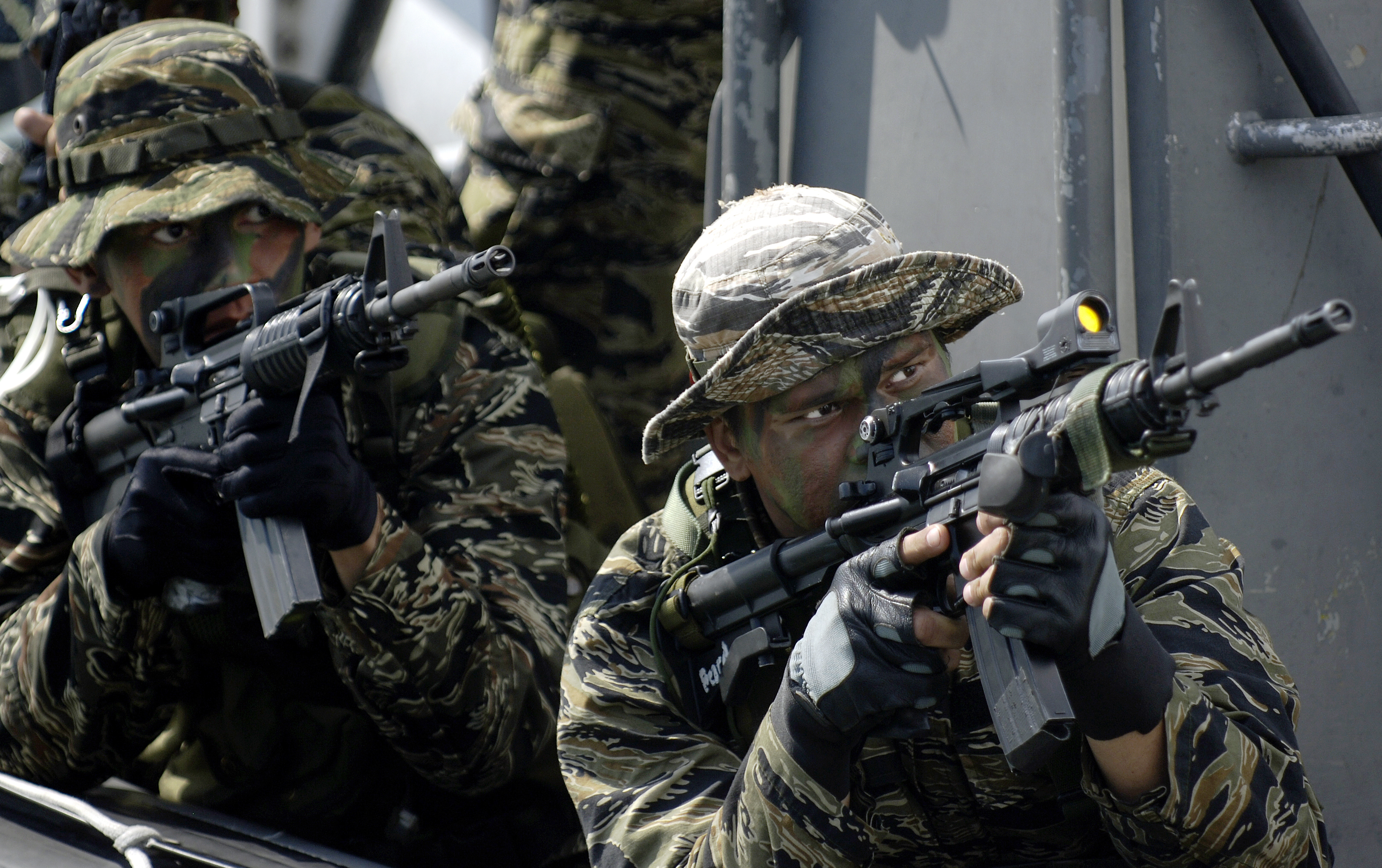
A Philippine Navy SEAL Team demonstrates their capabilities to the 74th Joint Civilian Orientation Conference in Manila, Nov. 8, 2007

Alongside their American counterparts, the SWF also train and operate alongside the Philippine Marine Corps and the various units of the Philippine Army's Special Operations Command, such as the Light Reaction Regiment.

== Units ==
SWF, PN is composed of the following units as of 2020:

=== Organizations ===
Special Warfare Force (SWF, PN) - Headquarters

- SEAL Group (SEALG)
- Special Boat Group (SBG)
- Naval Diving Group (NDG)
- Naval Explosive Ordnance Disposal Group (NEODG)
- Combat Service Support Group (CSSG)
- NAVSPECOPNS Training and Doctrine Center (NSOTDC)

=== Naval Special Operations Units (NAVSOUs) ===
Each unit is made up of 3 to 6 special operations and support teams, each of which have 8 sailors (1 officer, 7 enlisted).

- Naval Special Operations Unit 1 (NAVSOU1)
- Naval Special Operations Unit 2 (NAVSOU2)
- Naval Special Operations Unit 3 (NAVSOU3)
- Naval Special Operations Unit 4 (NAVSOU4)
- Naval Special Operations Unit 5 (NAVSOU5)
- Naval Special Operations Unit 6 (NAVSOU6)
- Naval Special Operations Unit 7 (NAVSOU7)
- Naval Special Operations Unit 8 (NAVSOU8)
- Naval Special Operations Unit 9 (NAVSOU9)
- Naval Special Operations Unit 10 (NAVSOU10)
- Naval Special Operations Unit 11 (NAVSOU11)

== Equipment ==
SWF operators are known to use the HK416, M4 assault rifles, M60E5/E6 GPMG and M110A2 sniper rifle and night vision PVS-14s and PVS-31s, while some SEALs have been seen with Elbit Systems XACT NVGs.

10 fast boats were acquired by the unit in December 2020.
