= Light Reaction Regiment =

Philippine Army counter-terrorist unit

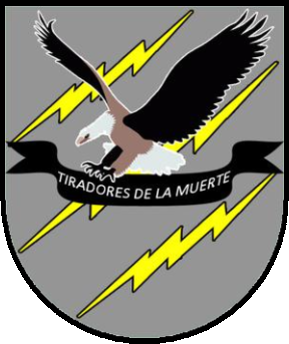
- Regiment Insignia, with the famous moniker of the Luna Sharpshooters (Spanish: Tiradores de la Muerte) as motto.
- Active: 1 February 2004 – present
- Country: Philippines
- Branch: Philippine Army
- Type: Special Operations Forces Special Missions Unit
- Role: Counter Terrorism; Direct Action; Special Reconnaissance; Special Operations
- Size: Classified
- Part of: AFP Special Operations Command
- Garrison/HQ: Fort Ramon Magsaysay, Nueva Ecija
- Nicknames: "LRR", "Philippines' Delta Force"
- Motto: "Tiradores de la Muerte" (Marksmen of Death)
- Engagements: Operation Enduring Freedom - Philippines; Trojan Horse Operations; Communist Insurgencies; Islamic Insurgencies; Anti-guerrilla operations against NPA; Anti-guerrilla operations against MILF; Moro conflict; Manila Peninsula siege; Zamboanga crisis; APEC Philippines 2015 Security; 2017 Marawi crisis; Joint Operation Haribon with NAVSOG during Marawi siege
- Decorations: Philippine Republic Presidential Unit Citation Badge; Presidential Streamer Award

Commanders
- Current commander: BGen Jose Jesus C. Luntok, PA
- Notable commanders: Jose Luntok, Lawrence San Juan, Alexander Macario, Danilo Pamonag

Insignia
- AFP Master Parachutist Badge

- Scout Ranger Qualification Badge

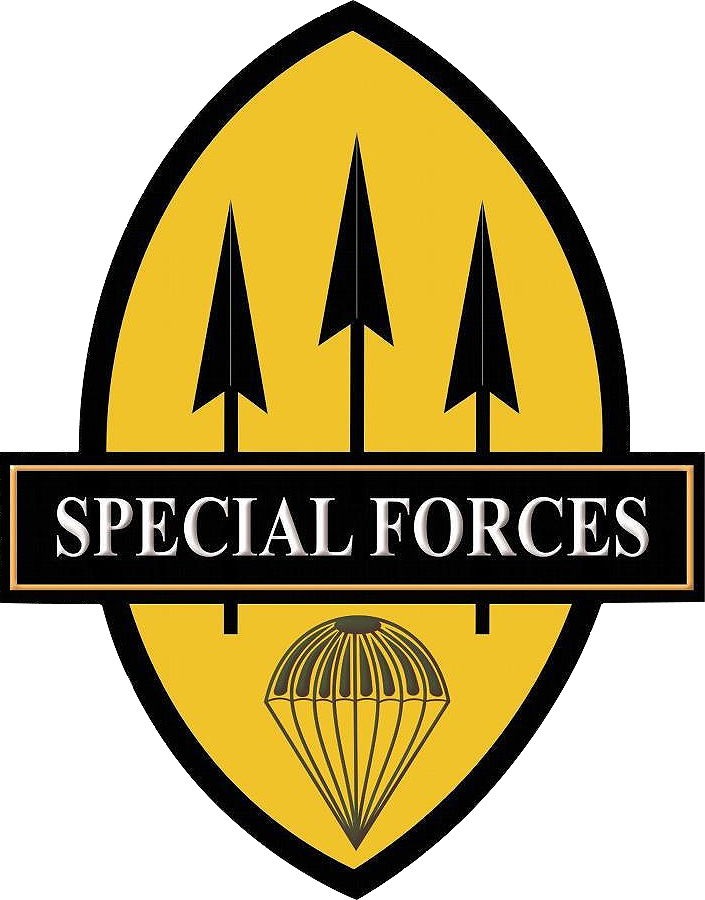
- Special Forces Qualification Badge

The Light Reaction Regiment (LRR) is a special operations unit under the jurisdiction of the Philippine Army's Special Operations Command. It is tasked to conduct rapid response missions, including counter-terrorism.

The unit is sometimes referred to as the Filipino counterpart of 1st Special Operations Detachment.

== History ==
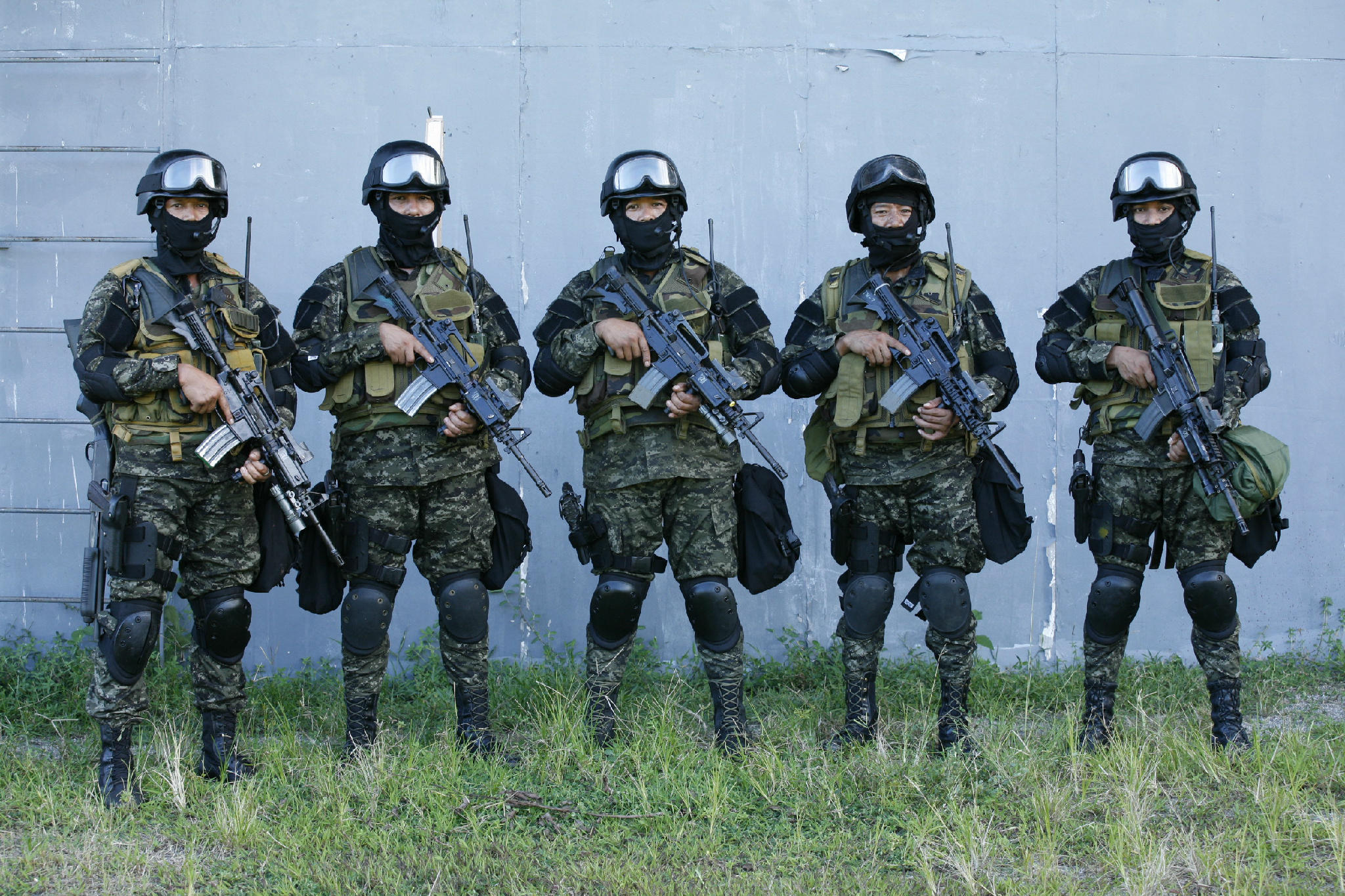
Then LRB commandos in 2012 posing with their combat gear.

The LRR's history began in August 1995 when the Armed Forces of the Philippines established an anti-terrorist unit within the ranks of the Philippine Army, known as Alpha Two Zero (A-20). It consisted of 20 SFR operators, placed into two 4-man assaulter teams, two 2-man sniper/observer teams, two 2-man breaching teams and a four-man C2 group.

In May 1996, 16 A-20 opearators graduated from the Special Action Force's Special Anti-Terrorist Course (SATC) at Subic Bay, Zambales. The unit became the 33rd Special Forces Company (33rd SFC) and was placed under the control of Task Force Aduana, which was set up under Executive Order No. 196, s. 2000 under the administration of former President Joseph Estrada to be deployed in anti-smuggling operations and other types of fraud committed by organized crime.

A-20 was seen as an interim solution as its size was too small to be deployed to combat terrorist threats in the Philippines. The 33rd SFC merged with the Anti-Crime Task Force.

Former Operational Detachment Alpha Team Leader Major Joseph H. Felter, who had previously been deployed to Mindanao in the 1990s, had the idea of creating a counter terrorism special operations unit in the Philippines. Felter spoke to Michael A. Sheehan on creating a counter-terrorism unit in the AFP. In September 2000, Admiral Dennis C. Blair went to the Philippines with a United States Pacific Command (USPACOM) team alongside Special Operations Command Pacific (SOCPAC) personnel, Joint U.S. Military Assistance Group (JUSMAG) officers and 1st Special Forces Group (United States) operators in a meeting with AFP officers and Philippine officials to plan for organizing and equipping the unit under Title 22 Chapter 22 (Mutual Security Assistance) authorities.

Felter met with Major Teodoro A. Llamas, then AFP-SOCOM Assistant Chief-of-Staff for Training. and Major Angel Adrien Sievert II, then AFP-SOCOM Assistant Chief-of-Staff for Operations prior to his meeting with Sheehan.

After years of training under American instructors, the Light Reaction Company (LRC) was officially activated on 1 February 2004 and was tasked to be deployed in Mindanao in order to combat Abu Sayyaf Group terrorists responsible for abducting several foreign hostages, with the unit conducting an operation to rescue Gracia Burnham from Abu Sayyaf terrorists alongside the Scout Rangers and Special Forces Regiment. Further exercises had been conducted during the 2006 Balikatan exercises. The LRC had been involved in a rescue operation conducted on a kidnapped Italian priest named Giancarlo Bossi by armed men from a rogue MILF group in 2007.

The unit was involved in the aftermath of the Manila Peninsula rebellion, where they had been deployed to Manila to deter any other Coup d'état attempts. LRC forces have been deployed to Mindanao to conduct anti-terrorist operations in the region. The unit changed its name to the Light Reaction Battalion (LRB) in 2008.

50 members of the unit, including 3 officers, were suspended on 9 February 2008, when elements of the LRB came under investigation for the alleged possible killing of innocent civilians on 4 February 2008 during operations in Mindanao against the MILF, known as the Ipil Incident. The unit was cleared of any wrongdoing since the investigation subsequently linked the killings to misinformation provided by an unreliable informant, who was involved in a clan feud and wanted to use the operation to get rid of a rival clan.

All three companies were deployed to Zamboanga City in September, 2013 and led the over 3,000 soldiers and police deployed in the siege. The terrain proved tough for the other units used to fighting rebels in the jungles and remote, uphill areas. The unit was undermanned throughout the operation, only being at 40% strength and had to be augmented by 45 SEALs from the Navy's Naval Special Operations Group. Despite the setbacks, the operation was a success, but it cost the lives of 9 LRB soldiers with a further 37 wounded.

LRB's elevation to a full regiment was formally sanctioned by Defense Secretary Gazmin on 16 January 2014, now renamed as the Light Reaction Regiment (LRR). A further three companies have been authorized to be added to the three currently operational, bringing the total end strength of the regiment up to 600 soldiers.

In 2014, the LRR conducted a trojan horse operation at a drag race to either kill or capture Abu Sayyaf target Sihata Latip, who was wanted for kidnapping 21 people in Malaysia in 2000. He went on to conduct a string of kidnappings in the Philippines over subsequent years, but as the Philippines got better at counter terrorism operations, the Islamists were cut off from overseas international terror-finance networks, particularly the ones originating in Saudi Arabia and in order to make up for this loss in income, they engage in kidnapping for ransom. The 24 LRR soldiers trained for a week to execute the mission. They dressed up as if going to a Muslim wedding, rented local jeeps and decorated it. Some soldiers dressed up as women to avoid raising suspicion. One soldier with a M249 light machine gun dressed as a pregnant woman, but forgot to shave on the day of the operation and had to loan a hand fan from one of the female soldiers on the base to cover his goatee. On the way to the drag race one of the jeeps broke down. The commander of the operation decided to go on with the mission with only one jeep and 13 men. When they arrived at the drag race, the LRR operators identified their High Value Target from about 50 civilians and terrorists, approached and drew weapons. A firefight ensued in which the target was killed, but at the loss of a LRR operator who got shot in the neck. The operators loaded up the two bodies and made their getaway, while being shot at by Abu Sayyaf and Moro Islamic Liberation Front.

In May 2017, the regiment spearheaded the army's counter terrorism effort in the Marawi crisis, clearing out the enemy house by house.

=== Support ===
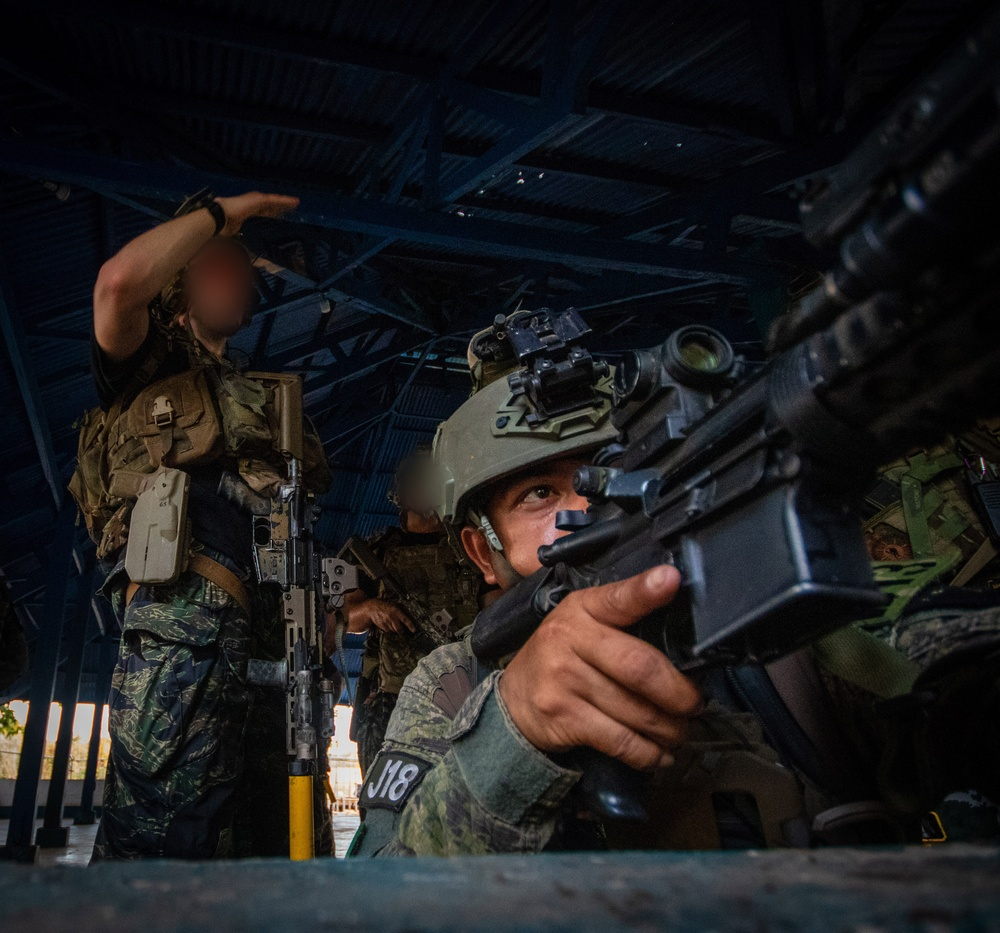
A Green Beret from the 1st Special Forces Group (1SFG) works with a LRR operator in Balikatan 24.

On 4 September 2018, the U.S. Counterterrorism Train and Equip Program provided more than 5 million rounds of ammunition worth Php117.4 million ($2.2 million), most of them being used by the LRR.

On 4 May 2020, Col. Monico E. Abang was appointed as the LRR's commander, taking over from Brig. Gen. Monico S. Batle.

On 14 February 2022, Lt. Gen. Romeo Brawner Jr. vowed to provide more support to the unit during his visit in Nueva Ecija.

== Structure ==
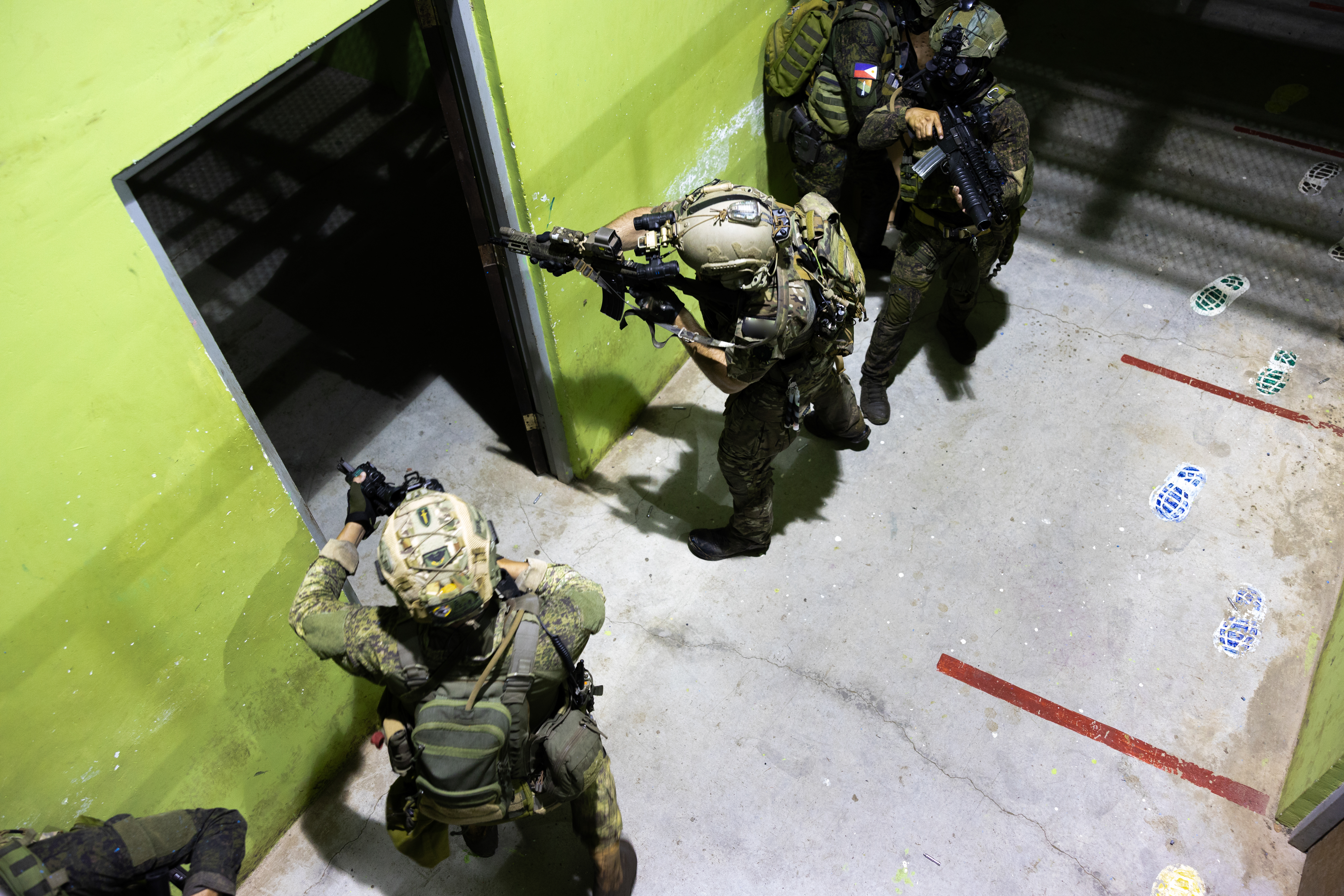
Light Reaction Regiment Assaulters during a low-light Close-Quarters Battle (CQB) Training alongside U.S. Special Operations Command Pacific operators.

The LRR is a regiment-size special operations unit with two Light Reaction Battalions (LRBs) consisting of a Headquarters, Higher Headquarters Company, a Military Police Unit, and Seven Light Reaction Companies (LRCs).

- Headquarters Company - Activated on 29 April 2004. It is the overall governing body of the Light Reaction Regiment, Responsible for Heading, Planning, and Executing Operations.
  - 1st Light Reaction Company "Eximius Ferratus" (1LRC) - Activated on 4 July 2001 after a rigorous 4-Month long training course patterned from JFKSWCS’ SFARTAETC and facilitated by instructors from 1st Special Forces Group’s C/1-1 Company. 1LRC is the Armed Forces of the Philippines' first Counter-Terrorist (CT) Qualified Unit.
  - 2nd Light Reaction Company "Nasiglat" (2LRC) - Activated on 19 August 2003. 2LRC Became the Philippines' Second CT-Qualified Unit.
  - 3rd Light Reaction Company "Wa’y Kurat" (3LRC) - 3LRC is Reported to be the Company in the LRR with the Highest amount of experience in fighting against lawless and renegade forces. The unit was activated on 11 December 2003.
  - 4th Light Reaction Company "Perdigones" (4LRC) - Operational by January 2015. It was deployed as security during the visit of Pope Francis in the Philippines.
  - 5th Light Reaction Company "Mandaragit" (5LRC) - The 5th Operational LRC. It went active by October 2015 and was deployed as security during the APEC Summit.
    - Light Reaction Sniper Task Group (LRR-STG) - Also known as "Maligno Sa Tulay" (Filipino: Boogeyman on the Bridge). A 16-man ad-hoc unit that wreaked havoc among the ranks of pro-Islamic State insurgents that attacked Marawi in 2017.
  - 6th Light Reaction Company "Dares Against Odds" (6LRC) - Operational by 5 January 2017. 6LRC was deployed in countless operations, including the Marawi Siege.
  - 7th Light Reaction Company "Molon Labe" (7LRC) - Not much is known about the existence of 7LRC. It is believed to be the newest and smallest Light Reaction Company.

The Activation of the 4LRC, 5LRC, and 6LRC was done subsequently after a General Order from the President was ordered which authorized the activation of the Light Reaction Regiment and the creation of its three additional Light Reaction Companies.

Light Reaction School (LRS) - Formerly called as the Counter Terrorist Development and Training School (CTDTS). It is responsible for Recruiting, Selection and Training of Candidates of the Counter Terrorist Course (CTC).

Light Reaction Regiment Military Police - The Light Reaction Regiment has its own Military Police unit for supporting other Light Reaction Companies.

== Counter Terrorism Course (CTC) ==
Prior to being qualified for the Light Reaction Regiment's selection and assessment, a candidate must be a graduate of either or both the Scout Ranger Course (SRC) or the Special Forces Operations Course (SFOC) with at least three (3) years' worth of combat experience. Given these qualifications, the LRR source their operators from the First Scout Ranger Regiment (FSSR), and/or the Army's Special Forces Regiment (Airborne) (SFR[A]).

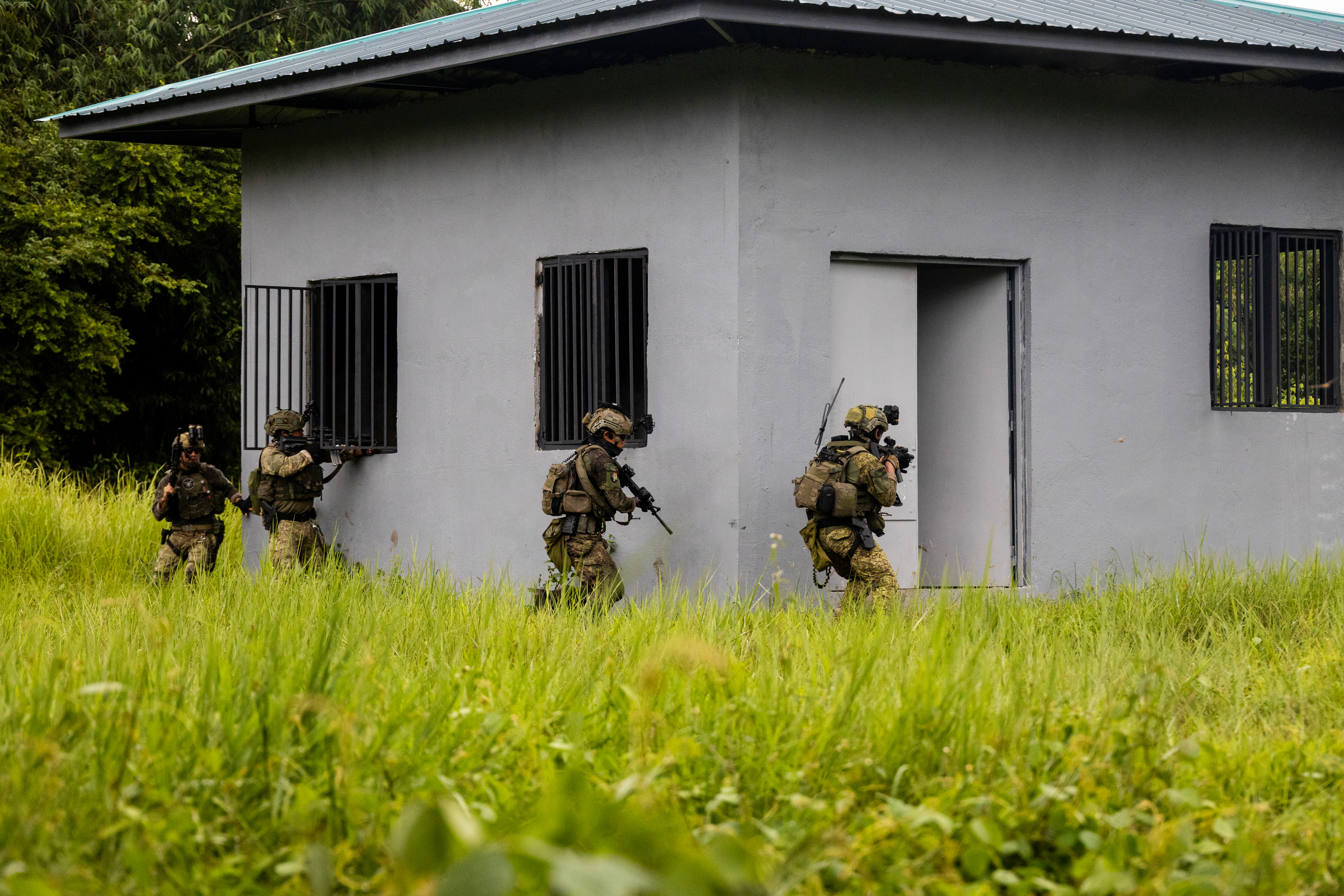
Light Reaction Regiment Assaulters participating in a Close-Quarters Battle (CQB) Exercise with U.S. Special Operational Detachment Alpha operators in Fort Magsaysay, Philippines.

Once qualified, the operators undergo an intense Physical Fitness Test (PFT), a series of land navigation exercises, and panel interviews with the Regimental Commander, assistant Chiefs of Staff, the Regimental Sergeant Major, and other line company commanders. Completing these steps only then the operators can undergo the Counter Terrorism Course (CTC).

The CTC is a four-month long course that embodies the most complex training program in the entire Army establishment, and most probably, the Armed Forces of the Philippines. It consists of multiple phases that includes:

  - Tactical Combat Casualty Care (T3C)/Combat Life Saver (CLS) Phase
    - A three-week module that teaches operators the "middle ground" between Combat First Aid, and Advanced Combat Life Support (ACLS)
  - Basic Pistol/Rifle Marksmanship Phase
    - a crash course for operators to further enhance their marksmanship skills, in preparation for more intense modules about handling firearms in high-pressure situations
    - Involves a graded marksmanship test using an M4 rifle with only iron sights, and an M1911 pistol
  - Combat Marksmanship Phase
    - A module unique only to the LRR as it teaches operators to shoot, move, and communicated in a dynamic combat environment. Given its uniqueness, little is known about this phase of the training course.
  - Close-Quarters-Battle (CQB) Phase
    - The longest module of the entire CTC, spanning two months. The CQB Phase teaches operators how to conduct surgical operations on urban terrain, from mission planning to proficient execution of the operation.
    - Involves a whole-day pass/fail culminating event, testing candidates through a series of simulated events. Those who fail will be "recycled" on the next CTC.

=== Light Reaction Sniper Course ===
This is the latest addition to the many qualification training courses LRR operators have to undergo, thanks to the unit's invaluable experiences during the Marawi Siege. This course focuses on long-range shooting using high-tech equipment privy only to LRR operators, as well as advanced shooting using a variety of rifles. This is formerly referred to as the Special Operations Target Interdiction Course (SOTIC).

=== Joint Training ===
The LRR conducts training with American special forces personnel via bilateral exercises. The LRR has also been training with the Australian SASR and SOCOM units since at least 2013, in exercises Dusk Caracha held in Australia, and Dawn Caracha held in Fort Magsaysay.

The unit has trained with British, Indonesian and Malaysian special forces units.

=== Light Reaction School ===
The Light Reaction School (Formerly known as Counter-Terrorist Development & Training School) is patterned after the John F. Kennedy Special Warfare Center and School's SFARTAETC, a CT program that is outside of the 1SFOD-D's Operator's Training Course, ran by the 1st Special Warfare Group at Fort Bragg.

The LRS was based on the Selection and Training Detachment (SATD), composed of USSF instructors with graduates of Counter Terrorist Class One assisting instructors, created in 2002 in order to make way for the future training requirement of the Counter Terrorist Course Class Two and Three. On 15 July 2004, it was replaced by the Selection & Training Platoon, a platoon under the LRB's HQ company.

Due to the increase of instructors, on 1 July 2012, the Selection & Training Platoon was deactivated and replaced by a company-sized SATD separate from the HQ company. As the LRB was activated as a regiment-wide unit, on 1 January 2014, the SATD was renamed CTDTS to meet the expansion which is approved by the LRR'S HHC.

== Equipment ==
=== Weapons ===
Assault Rifles
| | United States | Remington R4A3 | Standard assault rifle of the Philippine Army. |
| | United States | Colt M4A1 | Standard assault rifle of the LRR. Originally exclusively had 10.3" CQBR rifles in inventory, but was later supplemented by more 14.5" rifles. |
| | Germany | HK416A5 | Seen used in small numbers by LRR's primary assault units. |
| | Germany | G36 | Seen in small numbers with the LRR. |
Sidearms
| | Philippines | Rock Island Armory TAC Ultra .45 | Acquired during the 2017 Marawi Siege on the instructions of former president Rodrigo Duterte to include them. |
| | Austria United States | Glock 17 Gen 4 | Standard handgun of the Philippine Army. |
| | Germany | HK45 | Seen used by a Lieutenant Colonel from the LRR-STG during the 2017 Marawi siege. |
Subcompact Weapons
| | Germany | MP5A3 | Seen used with suppressors during the early days of the LRR. |
| | Belgium | FN P90 | Seen on at least one LRR member during the early 2010s. |
Shotguns
| | United States | Remington 870 Tac 14 | Standard breaching shotgun before 2023. |
| | Philippines | ARMSCOR PF14 | Standard breaching shotgun since 2023. |
Machine Guns
| | South Korea | Daewoo K3 | Standard issue machine gun of the LRR. |
| | Belgium | FN Minimi | Procured to replace the old Daewoo K3s in service. |
Sniper Rifles
| | United States | Remington M24 | Standard issue sniper rifle of the LRR. |
| | United States | KAC SR25 | Standard suppressed sniper rifle of the LRR. |
| | United States | Barrett M95 | Standard anti-materiel rifle of the Philippine Army. |
| | United States | Mk.13 Mod 7 | Loaned by the LRR-STG from MSOT 8123 during the 2017 Marawi Siege to help bridge a range gap that some rifles couldn't reach. |
| | United States | SIG 716G2 | Recently seen in limited numbers to supplement the LRR's sniper rifles. |
Night Vision Devices
| | United States | AN/PVS-31A | Procured to replace aging PVS-7Bs. |
| | United States | AN/PVS-14A | Used by the 5th Light Reaction Company during their sniper interdiction missions in Marawi. |
| | United States | AN/PVS-7B | Given by the United States during the conception of the LRR. Was used until the early 2020s when the LRR started procuring binocular night vision systems. |
Red Dot Sights
| | United States | Trijicon ACOG RX01 | Donated by the United States during the formation of the LRR. |
| | United States | Trijicon MRO HD | Procured by the LRR during the 2020s from local Trijicon retailer, UDMC. |
| | United States Philippines | SIG Romeo 5 | SIG Romeo 5 red dot sights, manufactured in the Philippines. Are used by the LRR in training exercises as of 2022. |
colspan="4 |Infrared Aiming Devices
| | United States | L3Harris AN/PEQ-15 | At least 2,300 units were acquired by the Army in two batches between 2008 and 2011. |
| | United States | Beamshot Trizm-G | Seen on several rifles during the 2017 Marawi Siege. |
| | United States | Insight AN/PEQ-2 | One of the primary Laser Aiming Modules used by the LRR, which were donated by the US. |
| | United States | Insight PAQ-4C | Used in the 2000's before being phased out in favor of newer lasers. |

== Bibliography ==
- Villanueva, Francis (2020). Tiradores: Missions and the Men of the Philippine's Light Reaction Regiment. CreateSpace. ISBN 978-1727153507.
