= 710th Special Operations Wing =

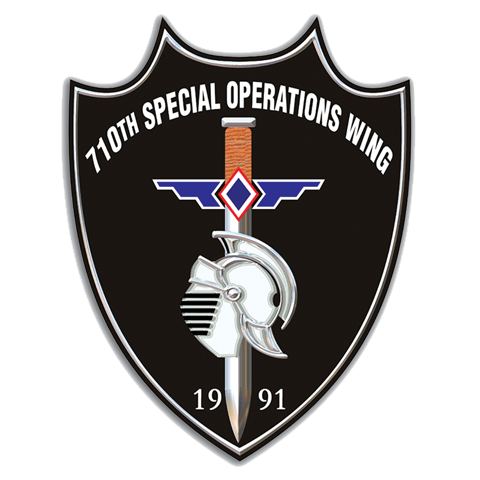
- Official insignia of the 710th Special Operations Wing
- Active: July 2, 1991 - Present
- Country: Philippines
- Branch: Philippine Air Force
- Type: Rapid deployment force Special Forces
- Size: unknown
- Part of: Special Operations Command (Philippines)
- Garrison/HQ: Colonel Ernesto Rabina Air Base
- Nickname: 710 SPOW
- Mottos: Train hard, Fight to win
- Mascots: Knights Helm & Sword
- Anniversaries: July 2
- Engagements: Anti-guerilla operations against the New People's Army and the Moro Islamic Liberation Front Anti-terrorist operations against the Abu Sayyaf; Operation Enduring Freedom - Philippines; Battle of Marawi

Commanders
- Current commander: BGen. Romell Allan P Genete, PAF
- Notable commanders: MGen Ruben L Carandang AFP; BGen Paulino P Porquez Jr AFP; BGen Ralph L Flores AFP
- EOD Qualification Badge

The 710th Special Operations Wing (710th SPOW) is the rapid deployment force of the Philippine Air Force (PAF), which is divided into ten-man airborne attack teams as most of its members are airborne qualified. The unit works closely with the 15th Strike Wing.

The unit is based at Colonel Ernesto Rabina Air Base.

== History ==
The 710th SPOW was established in 1991.

On November 6, 2013, the PAF drew up a plan to transfer the 710th SPOW away from Clark Air Base due to concerns that Clark Development Corp may not have enough land to lease to investors.

On March 14, 2023, the unit received a close air support trainer classroom and debriefing facility from the Australian government at Col. Ernesto Ravina Air Base in Capas, Tarlac.

=== Operations ===
In 2005, total of 13 detachments of Explosive Ordnance Disposal (EOD) personnel from the 710th responded to bomb threats at the request of concerned citizens from Angeles City to as far as Jolo, Sulu.

In February 2005, the wing also conducted Interoperability operations with the elements from 202nd Bde and 15th Strike Wing last February, in the First District of Batangas. In the same month, personnel from the 750th Combat Group conducted a joint ACTAF, NAKTAF, PACER and NCRPO in Cubao, Quezon City which resulted in the rescue of kidnap victim Kenshi Yu, and the apprehension of Mitchelle Yap Gumabao a.k.a. Dennis Roldan.

The 710th SPOW Combat Groups have been involved in environmental protection operations through the conduct of anti-illegal logging operations within the AORs (areas of responsibility) of Batangas, Cavite and Quezon provinces.

The unit also conducts civil-military and humanitarian operations. During the unit's 13th Foundation Anniversary on 2 July 2004 the wing conducted Military Civic Action Activities which included administering anti-polio vaccines to 65 children in Brgy. Calumpang, Mabalacat, Pampanga and medical and dental civic action program (MEDCAP) for the 1,628 residents of Calaca, Batangas. Other civil-military operations which benefited thousands of residents from different areas in the country were also conducted earlier that year. These operations bring the Wing closer to the people, and helps build trust and confidence and respect for the AFP as a whole.

The 710th SPOW was involved in responding to the Manila Peninsula Mutiny after being called in to rein in renegade soldiers led by Antonio Trillanes IV.

The unit participated in Exercise Haribon Tempest 2013 and in the 2021 Balikatan exercises.

The 710th SPOW was involved in combat operations in the Siege of Marawi.

=== Accidents ===
On April 7, 2016, a 710th SPOW operator was killed in an accident during Operation BALIKATAN 2016, which was due to failure to execute proper water landing procedures and failure of coordination and compliance in accordance with the Pacific Air Forces (PACAF) Commander memorandum.

=== Controversy ===
On December 5, 2018, an investigation was approved to look into allegations that 710th SPOW operators were involving in harassing Aeta people due to creating permanent structures under areas certified under Certificate of Ancestral Domain Claims (CADC).

== Tasks ==
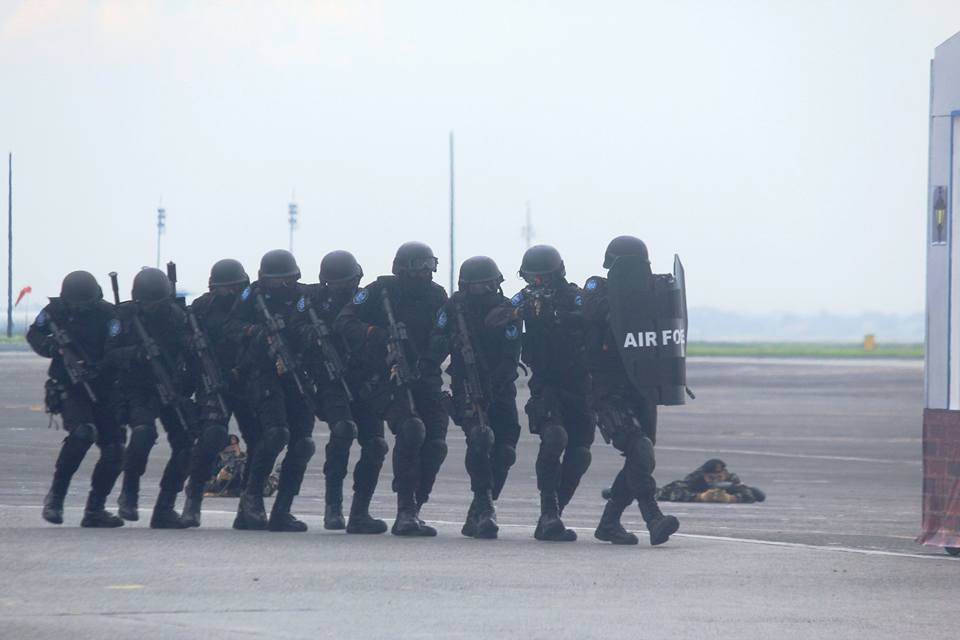
710th SPOW element practices anti-hijacking drill.

The mission of the 710th Special Operations Wing include the following:

1. Conduct contingency operations against hostile elements and civilian mass actions.
2. Coordination of air strikes.
3. Explosive Ordnance Disposal operations; K-9 and handler training on explosives and bomb detection
4. Civil disturbance control
5. Honor/ceremonial functions of the Philippine Air Force.

== Organization ==
The following are under the command of the 710th SPOW with a Special Operations Group, a Civil Security Group, a Combat Group, a Mission Support Squadron, and a Special Operations Combat Support Group.

=== Units ===
- 720th Special Operations Group
- 721st Special Operations Squadron
- 722nd Special Operations Squadron
- 723rd Special Operations Squadron
- 724th Special Operations Squadron
- 730th Combat Group
- 740th Combat Group
- 750th Combat Group
- 760th Combat Group (Said to be disbanded)
- 770th Special Operations Combat Support Group
- 772nd Explosives Ordnance Disposal Squadron
- 773rd K-9 Squadron
