= Philippine Division =

Philippine Division can refer to the Philippine Division (United States), or various divisions of the Philippine Army

- 1st Infantry Division (Philippines)
- 2nd Infantry Division (Philippines)
- 3rd Infantry Division (Philippines)
- 4th Infantry Division (Philippines)
- 5th Infantry Division (Philippines)
- 6th Infantry Division (Philippines)
- 7th Infantry Division (Philippines)
- 8th Infantry Division (Philippines)
- 9th Infantry Division (Philippines)
- 10th Infantry Division (Philippines)
- 11th Infantry Division (Philippines)
- Armor "Pambato" Division
