= DXJT =

- Jolo; Philippines
- Broadcast area: Sulu
- Frequency: 99.3 MHz
- Branding: 99.3 FM

Programming
- Languages: Tausug, Filipino, English
- Format: Community radio

Ownership
- Owner: Joint Task Force Sulu

History
- First air date: May 11, 2017
- Call sign meaning: Joint Task Force

Technical information
- Licensing authority: NTC
- Power: 1,000 watts

DXJT (99.3 FM), simply known on-air as 99.3 FM, is a radio station owned and operated by the Joint Task Force Sulu. The station's studio is located in Camp Asturias, Brgy. Asturias, Jolo, Sulu.
