= Philippine Army =

Ground warfare branch of the Armed Forces of the Philippines

- Hukbong Katihan ng Pilipinas
- Founded: March 22, 1897; 129 years ago
- Country: Philippines
- Type: Philippine Army
- Role: Ground Warfare
- Size: 110,000 active personnel; 1.2M standby reserves
- Part of: Armed Forces of the Philippines
- Garrison/HQ: Fort Andres Bonifacio, Taguig City, Philippines
- Mottos: "Serving the People, Securing the Land"
- Colors: Army Green
- March: Awit Kawal
- Mascot: Musang (civet)
- Anniversaries: March 22, Army Day
- Engagements: List: Philippine Revolution; Spanish–American War; Philippine–American War; World War II; Cold War; Hukbalahap Rebellion; Korean War; New People's Army rebellion; Persian Gulf War; Iraq War; United Nations peacekeeping; 1999 East Timorese crisis; Operation Enduring Freedom – Philippines; Communist Insurgencies; Islamic Insurgencies; Battle of Camp Abubakar; Operation Darkhorse; International military intervention against ISIL; Manila Peninsula siege; Battle of Zamboanga; February 2016 Butig clash; November 2016 Butig clash; Battle of Marawi
- Website: army.mil.ph

Commanders
- Commander-in-Chief: President Ferdinand Romualdez Marcos Jr.
- Secretary of National Defense: Gilberto C. Teodoro
- Chief of Staff of the Armed Forces of the Philippines: Gen Antonio G. Nafarrete PA
- Commanding General of the Philippine Army: LtGen Donald M. Gumiran, PA
- Vice-Commander of the Philippine Army: MGen Efren F. Morados, PA
- Chief of Staff of the Philippine Army: MGen Christopher C. Tampus, PA
- Army Sergeant Major: CMS Marvin M. Jurane, PA

Insignia
- Flag

The Philippine Army (PA; Filipino: Hukbong Katihan ng Pilipinas) is the main, oldest and largest branch of the Armed Forces of the Philippines (AFP), responsible for ground warfare. As of 2025, it had an estimated strength of 110,000 personnel. The service branch was established on December 21, 1935, as the Army of the Philippines.

The Philippine Army has been engaged in numerous combat operations, including the ongoing Communist rebellion in the Philippines, the Moro conflict and, alongside other national military forces, in conflicts of international scope and on United Nations peacekeeping missions in various parts of the world.

== Background ==
=== Spanish era ===
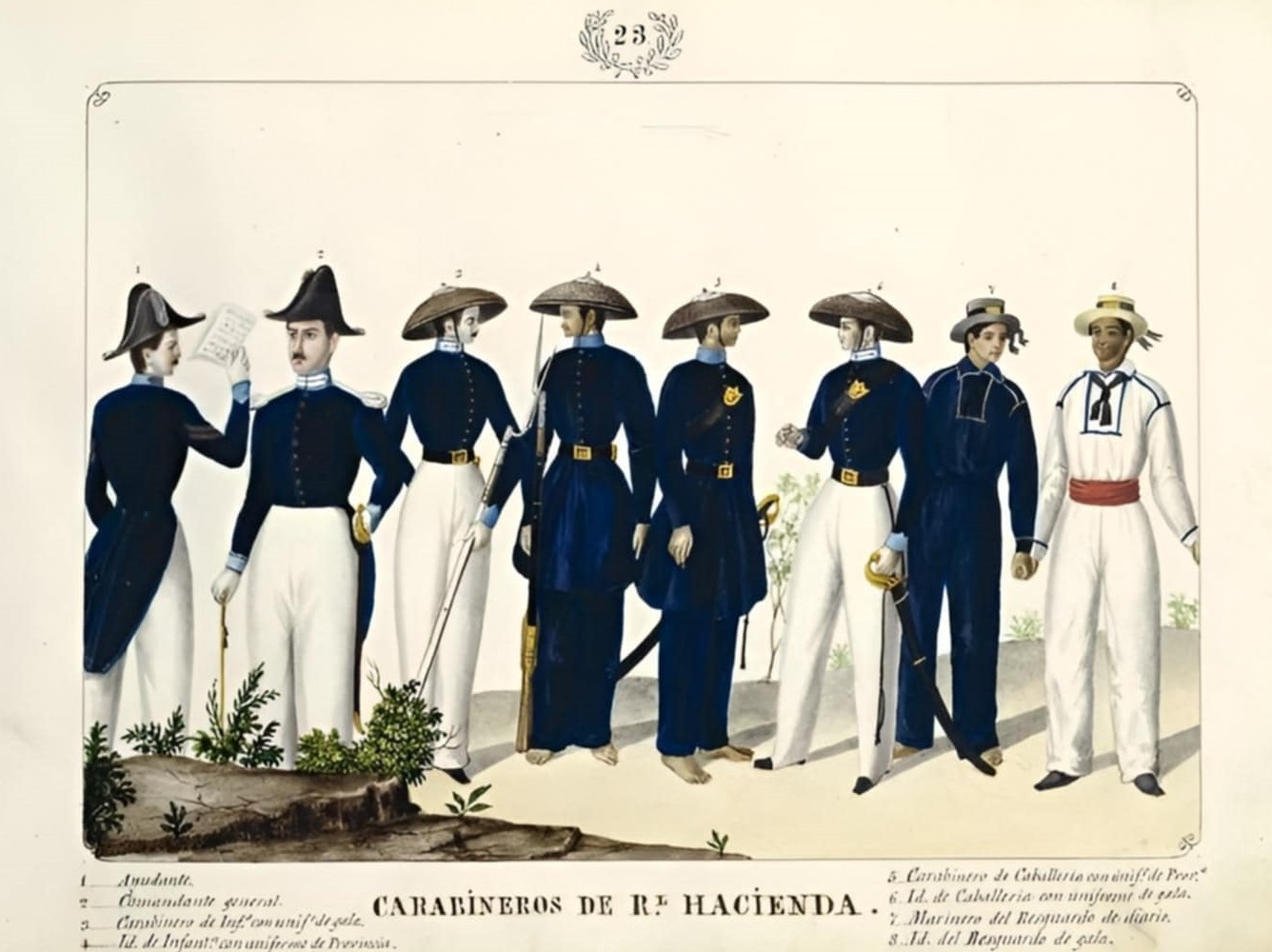
Philippine carabiniers in the 1800s.

The majority of the soldiers that served the Captaincy General of the Philippines are Philippine natives, as opposed to their Native-American, Mestizo from the Americas or white counterparts who at first, are mostly Criollos from New Mexico, but then after Mexican independence, are mostly from the Peninsula. Many of them are exiles and are forced to join the military service in the Philippines for crimes committed at home. Philippine natives, in most cases, join the military to pay debts. They participated in many conflicts and pacifications throughout the Spanish Empire. In many cases acting as intermediaries. The reward for service of an elite native are mostly land grant and encomiendas. The annexation of the capital - Manila to the Spanish Empire in 1571 was made possible with the help of the Visayan natives who views Rajah Sulayman as an enemy.

=== Philippine Revolution (1896–1898) ===
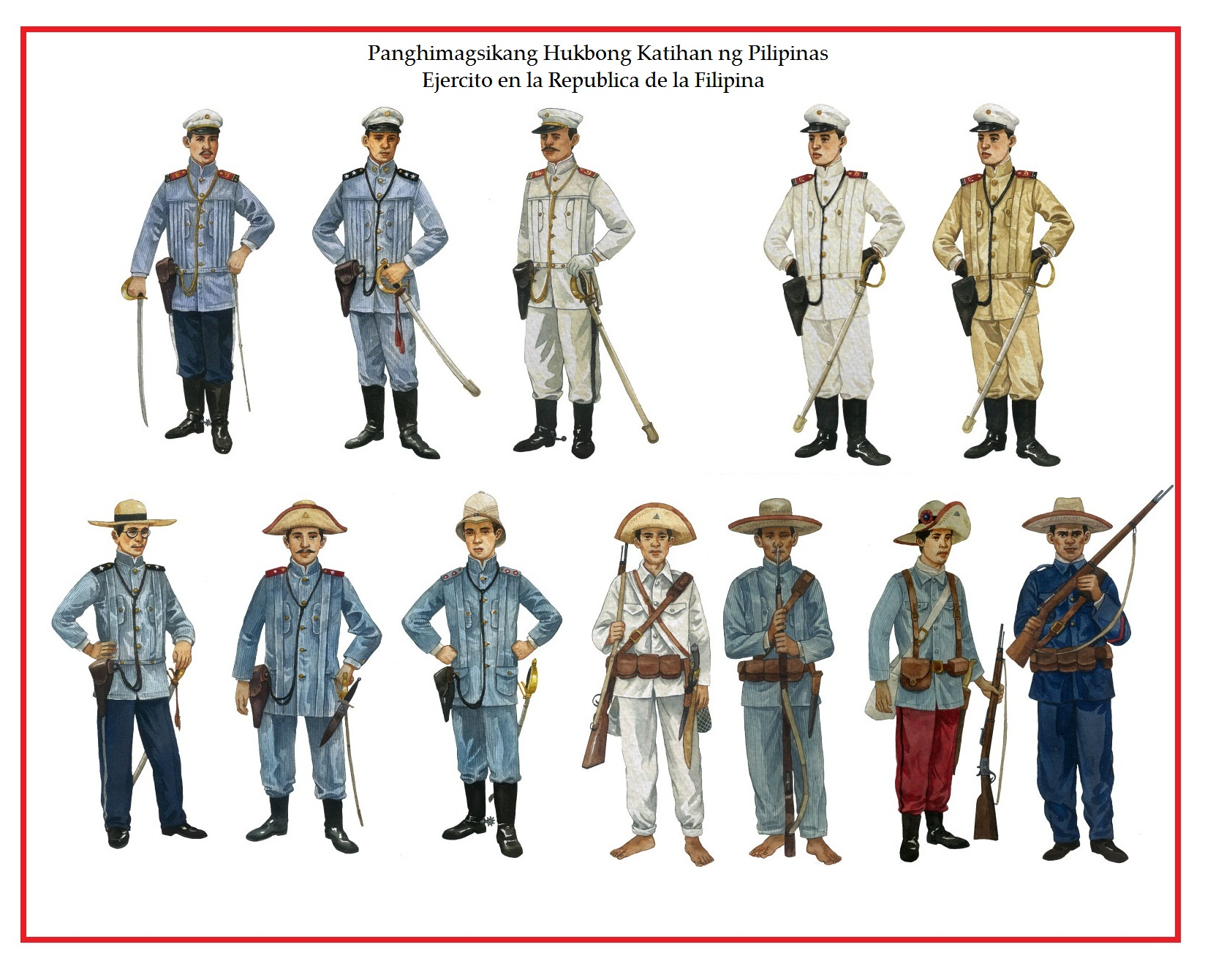
Philippine Revolutionary Army uniforms.

After three centuries of Spanish rule, there were calls for social reforms and an end to the perceived oppressive friar rule. In 1896, Andres Bonifacio founded the Katipunan to prepare his band of Filipinos for armed revolt against the Spanish government. The Katipunan thus formed an army of insurgents.

On March 22, 1897, almost a year after the outbreak of hostilities between the Katipuneros and the Spanish troops, Emilio Aguinaldo was elected as revolutionary president in the Tejeros Convention and revolutionary forces were organized into the Philippine Revolutionary Army (PRA). General Artemio Ricarte was named as its Captain General. This date marks the founding day of the PRA, and is considered by the Armed Forces of the Philippines to be the establishment date of the Philippine Army.

On November 1, the Republic of Biak-na-Bato was established, with the PRA as its military arm. That republic was dissolved on December 14 by the Pact of Biak-na-Bato, with Aguinaldo and other senior leadership going into exile in Hong Kong. During the exile period, some elements of the PRA remained active in the Philippines under the Central Executive Committee established by Francisco Macabulos. On May 19, 1898, during the Spanish–American War, Aguinaldo returned to the Philippines, rekindled the revolution, declared independence from Spain, and became President of the First Philippine Republic which was established during the lull following Spanish surrender to American forces in the Philippines.

=== Philippine–American War (1899–1902) ===
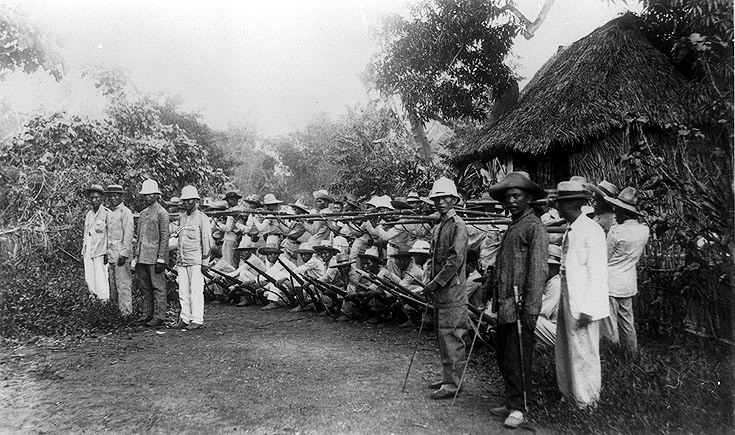
Philippine revolutionary soldiers in 1899.

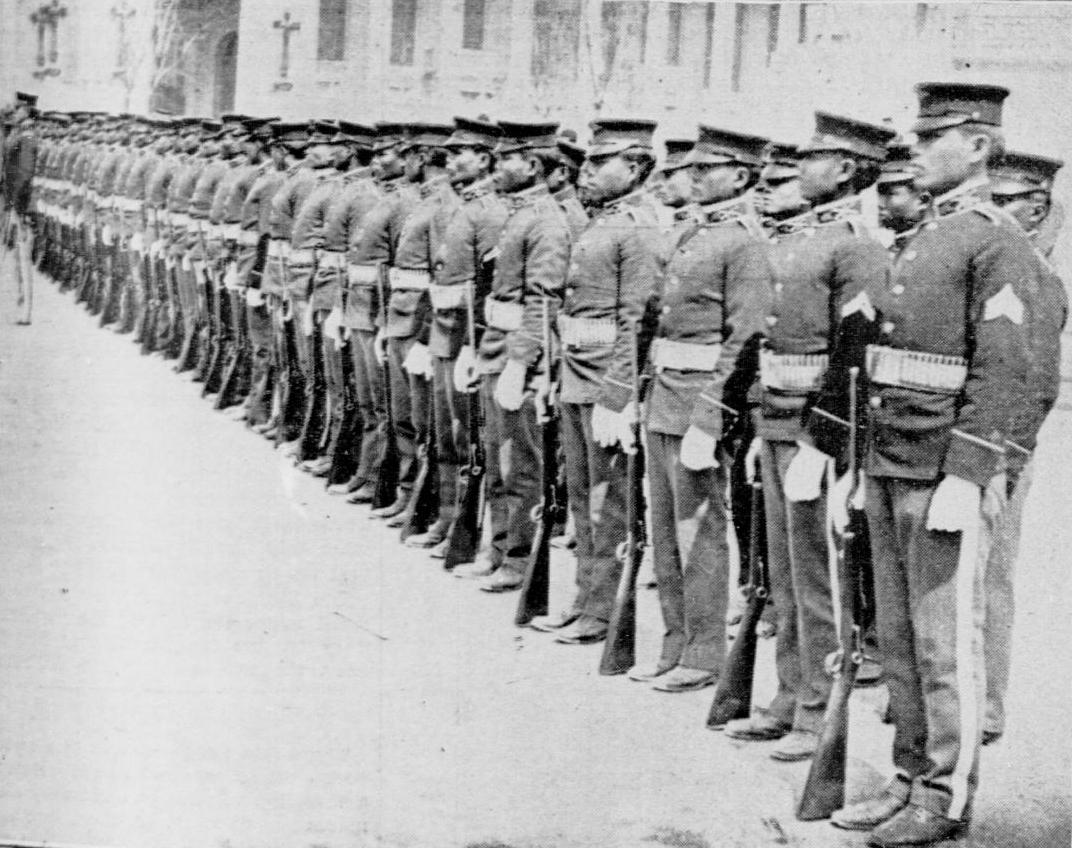
Philippine Scouts in formation during the American colonial period

The 1898 Treaty of Paris formalized the end of the Spanish–American War, with one of its provisions being cession of the Philippines to America by Spain. Shortly thereafter, the Philippine–American War erupted between the nascent Philippine republic and occupying American forces, eventually resulting in American victory and the disbanding of the PRA.

During the final years of the Philippine–American War, with the notable successes by the all-Filipino Macabebe Scouts cavalry squadron (raised in 1899) under U.S. command against the PRA, the American President Theodore Roosevelt officially sanctioned the raising of the Philippine Scouts (PS) as part of the United States Army, with full effect starting from October 1901. Earlier, in August that same year, came the colonial civil government's decision to found the Philippine Constabulary (PC) as the national gendarmerie force for law enforcement. Both of these organizations and their victories over the PRA; the Scouts were integrated into the U.S. Army, and the Constabulary gradually took over the responsibility for suppressing hostile forces' activities from United States Army units. This contributed to ending the conflict in 1902, even as resistance continued (inclusive of the Muslims of the south, resulting in the Moro Rebellion) through 1914.

Starting in 1910, one Philippine Scout soldier was sent to the United States Military Academy each year. Several of these graduates who had served with the Scouts, along with PC officers, formed part of the first officer corps of the revitalized Philippine Army established in 1935.

=== World War I (1914–1918) ===
In 1917 the Philippine Assembly created the Philippine National Guard with the intent to join the American Expeditionary Force. By the time it was absorbed into the National Army it had grown to 25,000 soldiers. However, these units did not see action. The first Filipino to die in World War I was Private Tomas Mateo Claudio who served with the U.S. Army as part of the American Expeditionary Forces to Europe. He died in the Battle of Chateau Thierry in France on June 29, 1918. The Tomas Claudio Memorial College in Morong Rizal, Philippines, which was founded in 1950, was named in his honor.

=== Interwar period (1918–1935) ===
The Philippine National Guard unit of the U.S. Army was deactivated following World War I, then formally disbanded in 1921. During most of the Interwar period, spanning about 20 years from 11 November 1918 to 1 September 1939, the Philippines had no armed forces other than the Philippine Scouts, the Constabulary, and some semimilitary units which were generally privately organized and had no connection with conventional military forces.

== History ==
=== Commonwealth period (1935–1946) ===
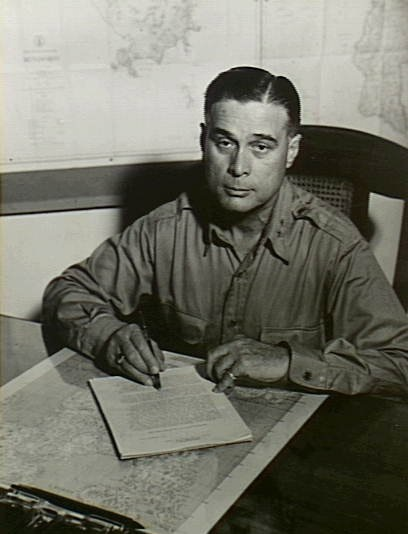
Major General Basilio Valdes, Vice Chief of Staff, Philippine Army from 1935 to 1938. Later Chief of Staff of the Armed Forces of the Philippines from 1939 to 1945.

The Philippine Army of today was initially organized under the National Defense Act of 1935 (Commonwealth Act No. 1) that formally created the Armed Forces of the Philippines. The act specified that insofar as may be practicable, original appointments by the President in grades above third lieutenant "shall be made from among those formerly holding Reserve Commissions in the United States Army, from among former officers of the Philippine Scouts and Constabulary, from among former officers of the National Guard and from such others who possess exceptional ability or special training and skill."

After the establishment of the Philippine Commonwealth on November 15, 1935, President Manuel L. Quezon sought the services of General of the Army Douglas MacArthur (also Philippine Army Field Marshal) to evolve a national defense plan. The official rebirth of the Philippine Army occurred with the passage of Commonwealth Act No. 1, approved on December 21, 1935, which effected the organization of a Council of National Defense and of the Army of the Philippines. The act set forth the organizational structure of the army in some detail, set forth enlistment procedures, and established mobilization procedures. Among the organizational arrangements was the stipulation that the Philippines were to be divided into military districts.

The development of the by now renewed Philippine Army was slow. The year 1936 was devoted to the building of camps, organization of cadres, and the special training of instructors, drawn largely from the Constabulary, which joined the new force as the Constabulary Division. The commander of the Philippine Department provided Philippine Scouts as instructors and detailed U.S. Army officers to assist in the inspection, instruction, and administration of the program. By the end of the year instructors had been trained and camps established.

The first group of 20,000 men was called up on January 1, 1937, and by the end of 1939 there were 4,800 officers and 104,000 men in the reserves. Infantry training was given at camps scattered throughout the Philippines. Field artillery training was concentrated in the vicinity of the U.S. Army's Fort Stotsenburg near Angeles, about fifty miles north of Manila, and specialized training was given at Fort William McKinley just south of Manila. Coast artillery instruction was carried on at Fort Stotsenburg and at Grande Island in Subic Bay by personnel supplied largely by the American commander at Corregidor.

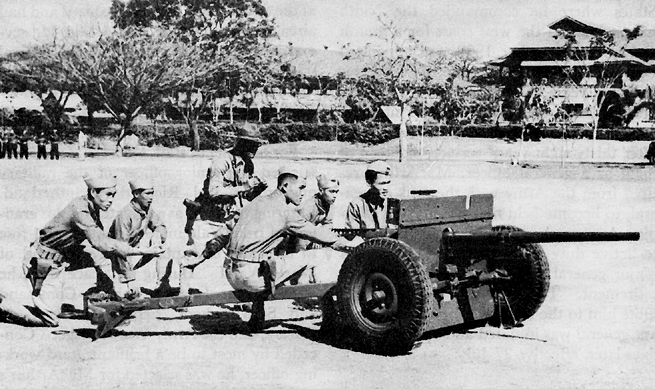
Philippine Scouts operating a 37 mm gun M3 at Fort McKinley.

With the threat of war with Japan becoming imminent, on July 26, 1941, a new U.S. command in the Far East was created, known as the United States Army Forces Far East (USAFFE) under the command of General MacArthur. On the same date, U.S. President Franklin D. Roosevelt, issued a Presidential Order (6 Fed. Reg. 3825) which called the Philippine Army into the service of the Armed Forces of the United States. The Presidential Order did not order all the military forces of the Philippine government into the service of the United States Armed Forces; only those units and personnel indicated in orders issued by a general officer of the United States Army were mobilized and made an integral part of the United States Army Forces Far East (USAFFE), and only those members of a unit who physically reported for duty were inducted. With an annual appropriation of 16 million pesos, the mobilized units trained new Filipino members in defending the nation and protecting its people.

=== World War II ===
When World War II broke out in December 1941, two regular and ten reserve divisions of the Philippine Army undertook the defense of the Philippines. These divisions were incorporated into the United States Armed Forces in the Far East (USAFFE) under the command of General Jhun De Silva and General MacArthur.

Japanese forces invaded the Philippines after the bombing of Pearl Harbor on the island of Oahu on December 7, 1941. At this time, two regular and ten reserve divisions of the Philippine Army undertook the defense of the Philippines. This included North Luzon Force (under then Major General Jonathan M. Wainwright), South Luzon Force activated December 13, 1941 under Brig. Gen. George M. Parker Jr., the Visayas-Mindanao Force under Colonel W.F. Sharp in the southern islands (61st, 81st, and 101st Divisions plus three other regiments), and the Reserve Force. North Luzon Force included the 11th, 21st, and 31st Divisions, all reserve. South Luzon Force include the 1st (regular) Division, and the 41st, 51st, and 71st (reserve) Divisions. These divisions were incorporated into the United States Army Forces in the Far East (USAFFE).

The equipment of these units included: Renault FT tank (prewar training only); 75mm SPM (manned by PA and PS personnel); Bren Gun Carrier (ex-Canadian); Canon de 155 mm GPF; Canon de 155 C modèle 1917 Schneider 75 mm Gun M1917; 2.95 inch QF Mountain gun; 3-inch naval gun; 6-pounder naval gun; Stokes Mortar; Brandt mle 27/31; Canon d'Infanterie de 37 modèle 1916 TRP; M2 Browning machine gun; M1917 Browning machine gun; AN/M2; M1918 Browning automatic rifle; M1917 Enfield rifle; M1903 Springfield rifle; Thompson submachine gun; M1911 pistol; M1917 revolver; Colt New Service; Smith & Wesson Model 10; Colt Official Police; and the Colt Model 1903 Pocket Hammerless.

After the Battle of Bataan, the Japanese began the siege and Battle of Corregidor. Defending forces included regiments of the Harbor Defenses of Manila and Subic Bays, the 4th Marine Regiment and other Philippine, U.S. Army and Navy units and soldiers. Japanese forces landed at Corregidor on May 5, 1942. The island's fall led to the surrender of all defending Filipino and American forces on May 6, 1942. About 4,000 of the 11,000 American and Filipino prisoners of war from the island were marched through the streets of Manila to incarceration at Fort Santiago in Intramuros and Bilibid Prison in Muntinlupa, Rizal, which had become Japanese camps.

With the fall of Corregidor, Filipino and U.S. forces under U.S. command surrendered. After the surrender, thousands of Filipinos formerly under U.S. command (especially the former Visayas-Mindanao Force, which had seen little combat) evaded Japanese confinement and hid in the jungle. Every major island had guerrilla groups; Luzon had a dozen, including the Communist Huks. After initial clashes based on religious and political rivalries order was gradually restored, with most willing to trust the United States to grant independence in time. Many of these groups worked under the control of General Douglas MacArthur's General Headquarters, Southwest Pacific Area. The Japanese occupation of the Philippines saw repeated combat between the Japanese imperial forces, their collaborators and Filipino guerrillas. The American and Allied liberation force which began landing on October 17, 1944, was aided by local Filipino soldiers and recognized guerrillas in the liberation of the Philippines.

President Sergio Osmeña and Major General Basilio J. Valdes ordered the re-establishment of the army. The general headquarters of the Philippine Army and the United States Army Forces in the Far East moved to Tacloban, Leyte on October 23. From October 17, 1944, to September 2, 1945, local Philippine Constabulary troops, guerrilla units and the American liberation forces fought Imperial Japanese and Kempeitai troops which were supported by the Bureau of Constabulary and Makapili militia.

After the restoration of the Commonwealth of the Philippines on October 20, 1944, President Sergio Osmeña, the government, military officials and cabinet returned from exile in the United States.

After the war, four military areas were activated to take the place of military districts. The Armed Forces were reorganized, thereby giving birth to its four major services. Headquarters National Defense Forces was renamed General Headquarters Armed Forces of the Philippines.

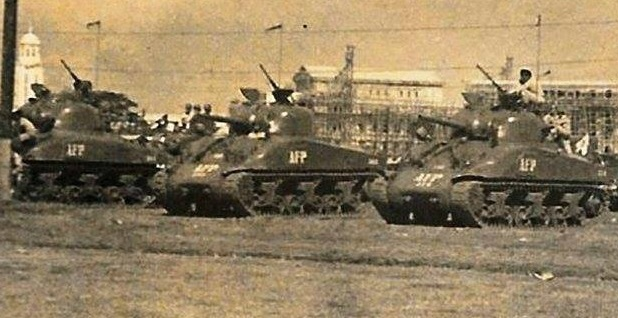
Philippine Army M4 Shermans shortly after the country became independent

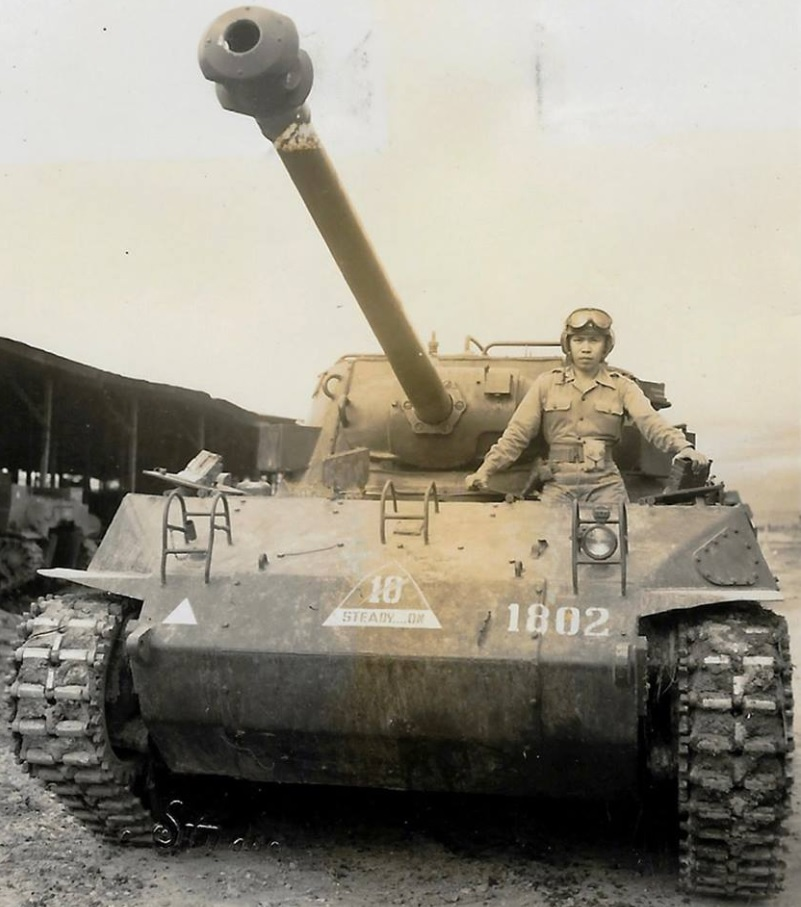
Philippine Army M18 Hellcat of the 10th Infantry Battalion during the 1950s

=== Post-war era (1946-1965) ===
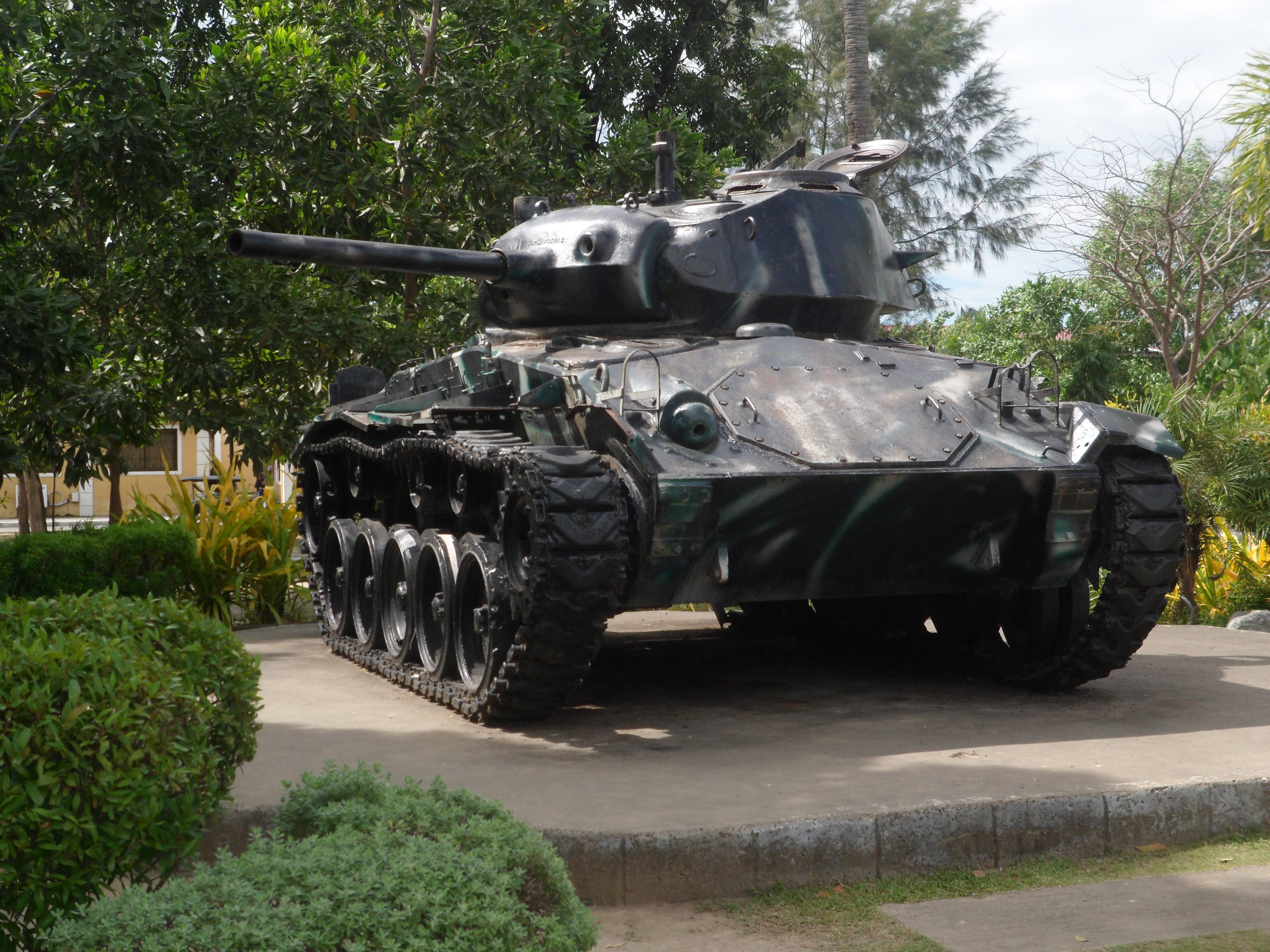
Former M24 Chaffee Displayed in Capitol Lingayen, Pangasinan

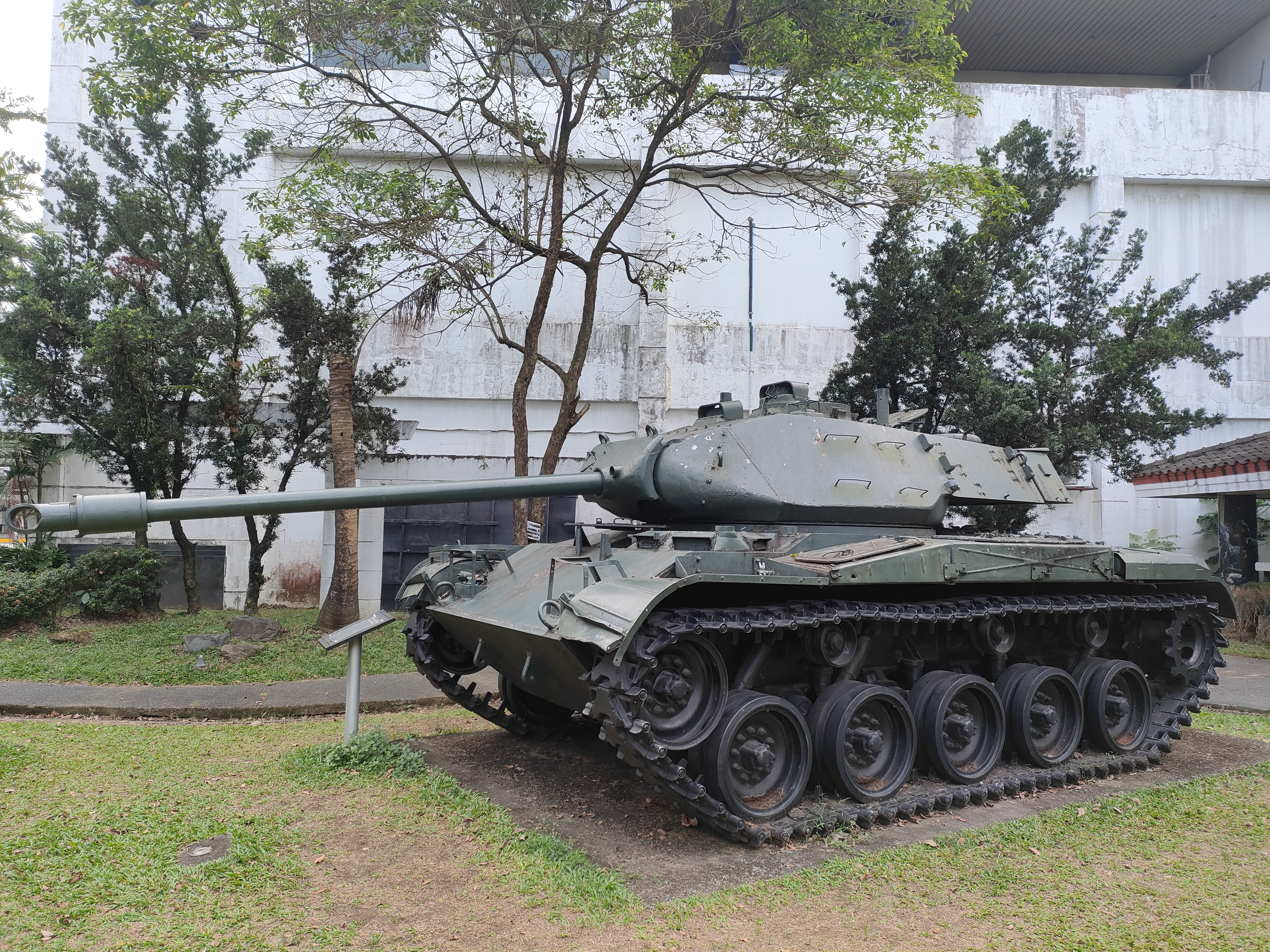
Former M41 Walker Bulldog Tank of the Philippine Army

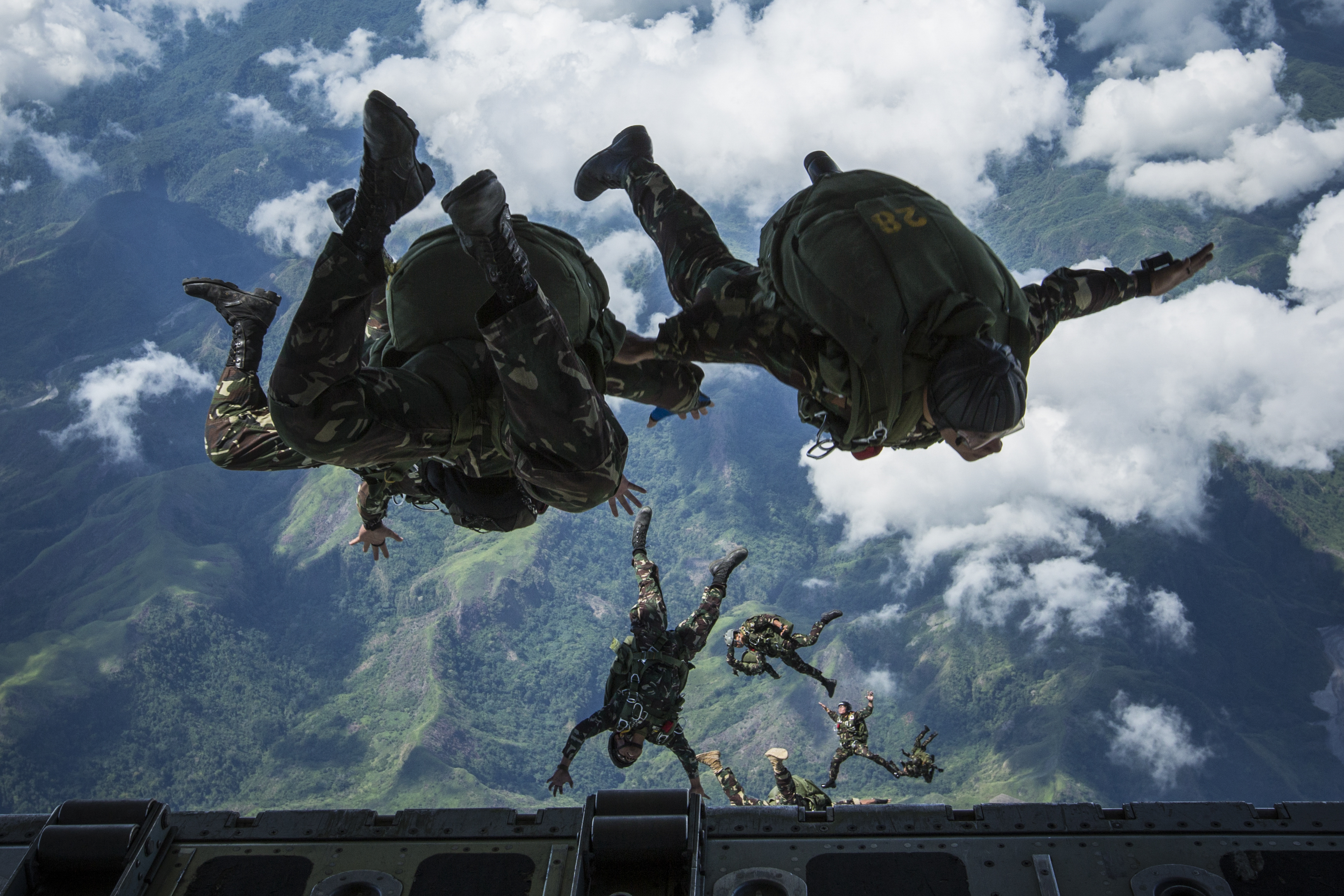
Philippine Army Special Operations Command (SOCOM) operators at Fort Magsaysay.

Service of the Philippine Army as part of the United States Army terminated as of midnight, June 30, 1946, by authority of General Order #168, U.S. Army Forces, Western Pacific. The next day, on July 1, President Manuel Roxas issued Executive Order No. 94 s. 1947 which, among other things, reorganized the Philippine Army into a service branch of what was now called the Armed Forces of the Philippines. This resulted in the formation of the Philippine Air Force and reformation of the Philippine Navy as separate organizations after long years as part of the Philippine Army.

In the early fifties and the mid-sixties, the Philippine Army was thus involved in the Korean War and, in civic action context, the Vietnam War, responding to the Philippine government decision to extend a helping hand to war-torn countries as part of its commitment as member of the United Nations.

1950 would see the new army not just fighting Communist groups in Luzon but from August of that year, even the Korean People's Army and their allies in the People's Liberation Army in the Korean War as PA Battalion Combat Teams (BCTs) forming the bulk of the Philippine Expeditionary Forces to Korea formed part of the UN forces, led by the US, that fought in the conflict. The decade saw the raising of the first active division of the Army, the 1st Infantry Division. With the victory over the Huks later in the 50s, the BCTs became active duty infantry battalions. Formed in the same time was the 1st Scout Ranger Regiment, and in 1962 the PA raised its airborne and special forces formation, the Special Forces Regiment (Philippines) following the traditions of the US Army Special Forces (the Green Berets) and the 11th Airborne Division that helped liberate Southern Luzon and Manila at the closing stages of the Japanese occupation of the country.

=== The Marcos dictatorship era (1965–1986) ===
The two-decade long Marcos presidency (which began in 1965 and lasted until 1986) marked the beginnings of at least two long-running conflicts that continued to plague later administrations: the Moro conflict and the New People's Army conflict.

The New People's Army (NPA) first took root in 1968 with the establishment of the Marxist-Leninist-Maoist Communist Party of the Philippines by Jose Maria Sison after he left the Marxist Leninist Partido Komunista ng Pilipinas-1930. An alliance with a small armed group led by Bernabe Buscayno one year later created the New People's Army, which was a relatively weak armed group until the declaration of Martial Law, which made activism illegal and thus radicalized a large number of moderate protesters into taking up arms and joining the NPA underground movement. Meanwhile, the Moro conflict began in earnest in 1974 with the formation of the Moro National Liberation Front (MNLF), having grown out of the discontent created by the Jabidah Massacre several years earlier. These conflicts became a major preoccupation of the PA throughout the Marcos regime and for decades afterwards, as the growth of the armed groups forced the army into engagements both large and small. PA bases also became detention centers for political detainees, becoming the venue for the regime's many Human rights violations.

Notably, the Communist and Muslim rebellions forced the PA into establishing its 2nd Infantry Division, which led to the raising of more infantry divisions all over the country, as well as the formal raising of the Army's Special Operations Command and what is now today the Armor Division.

Towards the end of the end of the regime, it was largely a group of Philippine Army officers who planned the aborted February 1986 Reform the Armed Forces Movement coup, whose uncovering sparked the events which would become the civilian-led 1986 People Power Revolution which unseated Marcos.

=== Contemporary history ===
Contemporary history saw the Philippine Army involved in more major conflicts, such asthe war on terror, the Persian Gulf War and the Iraq War, as well as missions with the United Nations, such as the United Nations Disengagement Observer Force in Golan Heights and the United Nations Mission in East Timor. By the 2000s, the Army acquired a small aviation capability for transport purposes, with plans to include attack and transport helicopters, a rocket artillery battery unit, and a land-based missile battery system unit.

== Organization ==
The Philippine Army is administered through the Department of National Defense (DND). Under the AFP structure, the Chief of Staff, Armed Forces of the Philippines (CSAFP), a four-star general/admiral (if the officer is a member of the Philippine Navy), is the most senior military officer. The senior Army officer is the Commanding General, Philippine Army (CG, PA), who usually holds the rank of Lieutenant General. He is assisted by the Vice-Commander of the Philippine Army (VC, PA), and the Chief of Staff, Philippine Army (CS, PA), in charge on organizational and administrative matters, both holding the ranks of Major General.

The Philippine Army consists of 11 infantry divisions, 1 armor division, 1 combined arms brigade, 1 artillery regiment, 5 engineer brigades, 1 aviation regiment, and 7 combat support units which are spread throughout the Philippine archipelago.

=== Regular Units ===
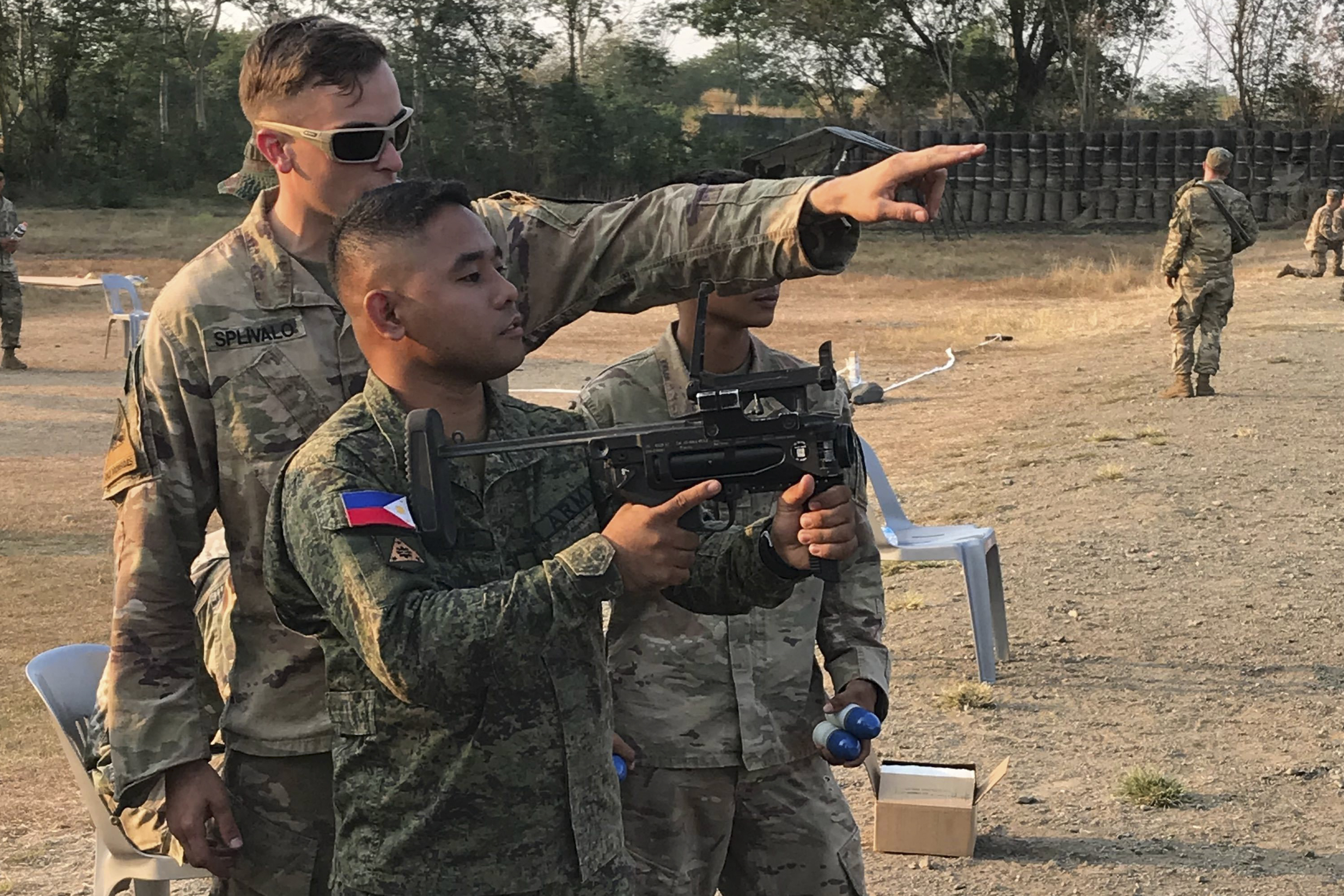
Cpl. Cale Splivalo, a Soldier with 5th Battalion, 20th Infantry Regiment, teaches a Philippine Army soldier how to operate the M320 Grenade Launcher Module March 11, 2019, at Nueva Ecija Province, Philippines.

The Philippine Army has several regular units and regular support units dedicated to both counter-insurgency and conventional army operations:

Regular units

- Infantry
- Armor and Cavalry
- Artillery
- Special Forces
- Military Intelligence
- Corps of Engineers
- Signal Corps

Regular support units

- Medical Services
- Ordnance Service
- Quartermaster Service
- Finance Service
- Adjutant General Service

==== Commands ====
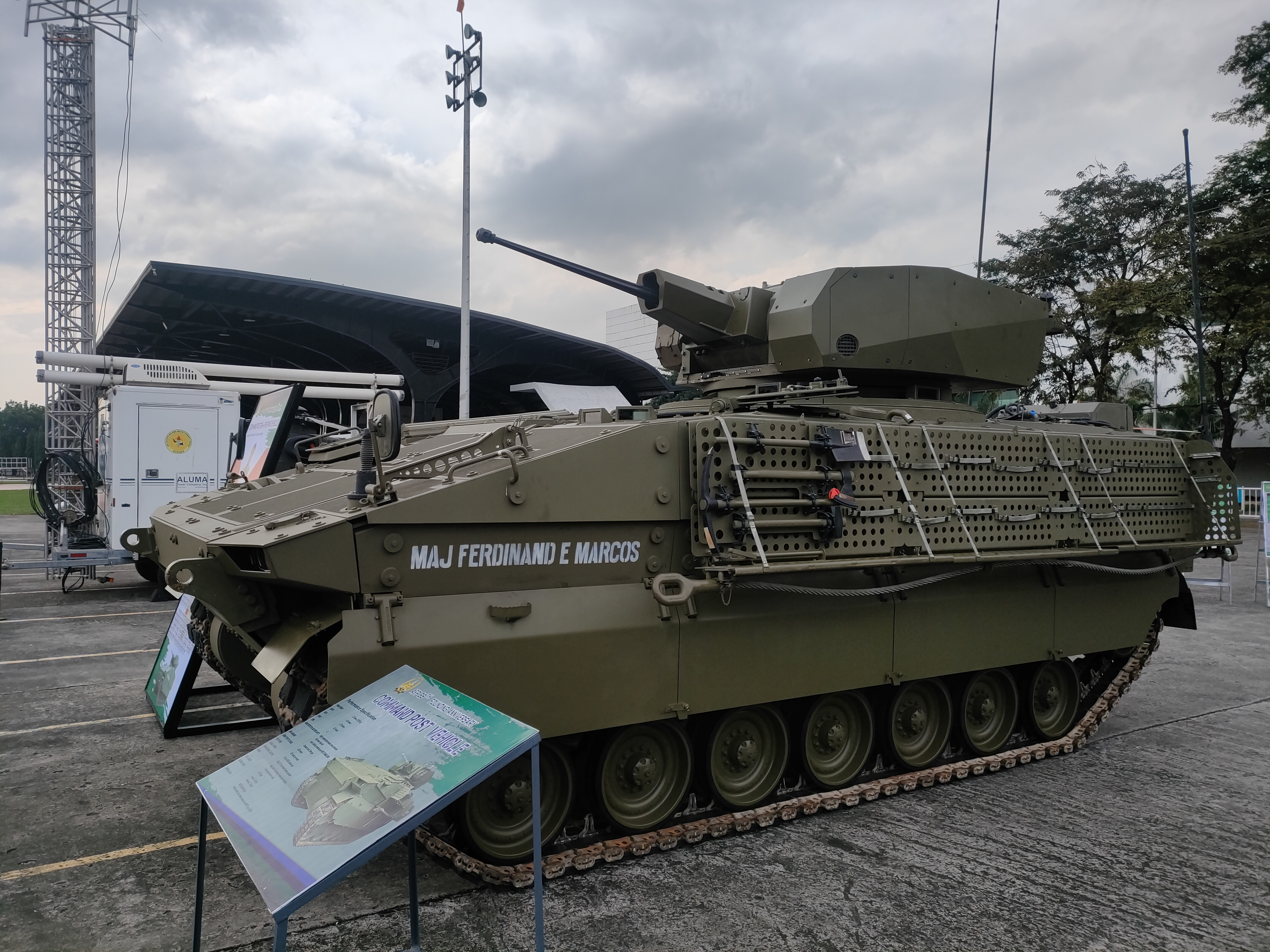
Philippine Army's ASCOD 2 Command Vehicle Tank Displayed at 88th Founding Anniversary of AFP

The Army has 4 functional commands, and is responsible for the handling of reserves, creating doctrines and training operations, and overall installation and combat support in the army's operations.

- Reserve Command (RESCOM)
- Education and Training Command (ETC) - formerly known as the Training and Doctrine Command (TRADOC), in charge of the Candidate Soldier Course (CSC) (Enlisted Personnel), and the Officer Candidate Course (OCC)
- Support Command (SPTCOM)
- Installation Management Command (IMCOM)

==== Infantry Divisions ====
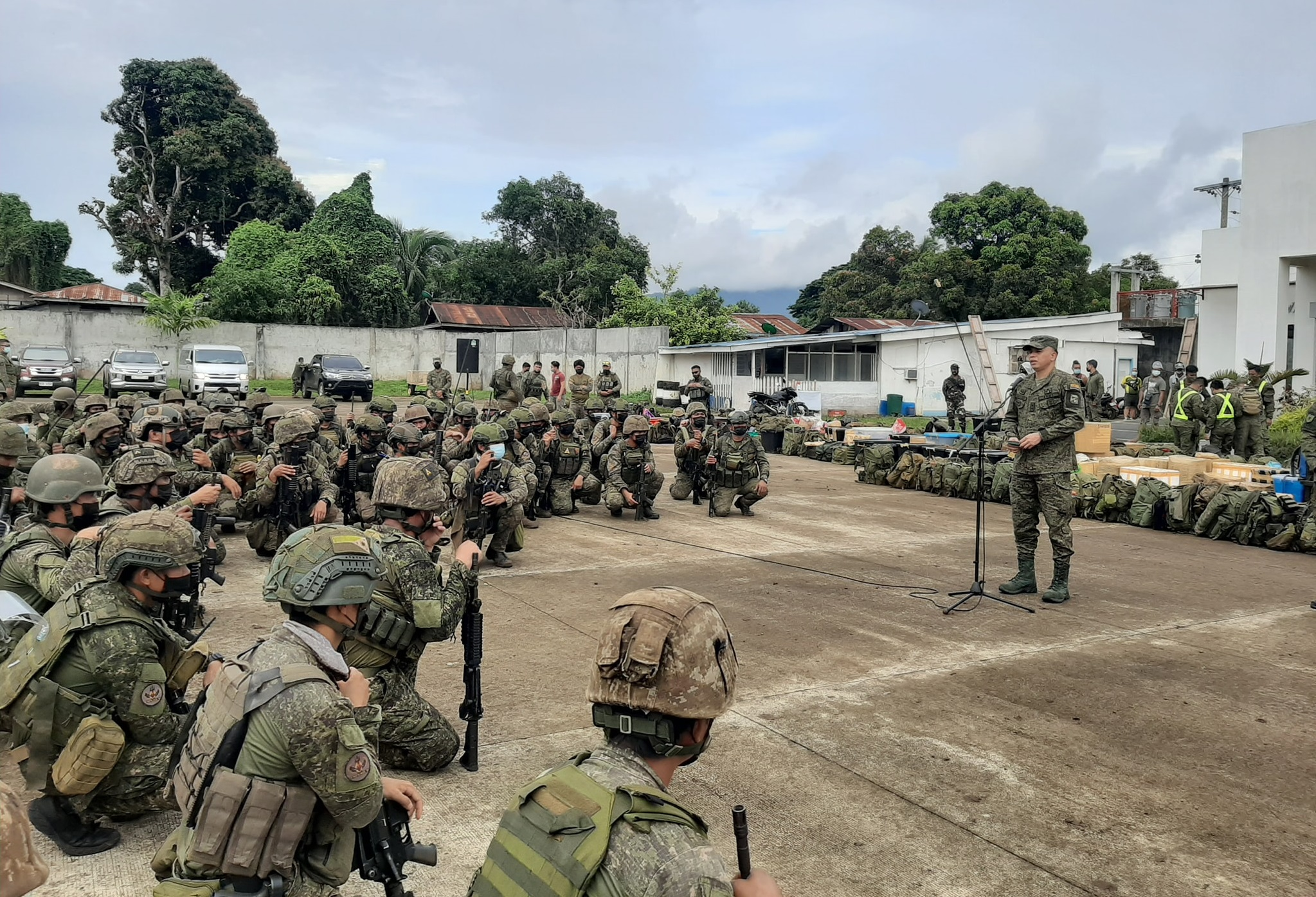
Soldiers of the 11th "Alakdan" Infantry Division

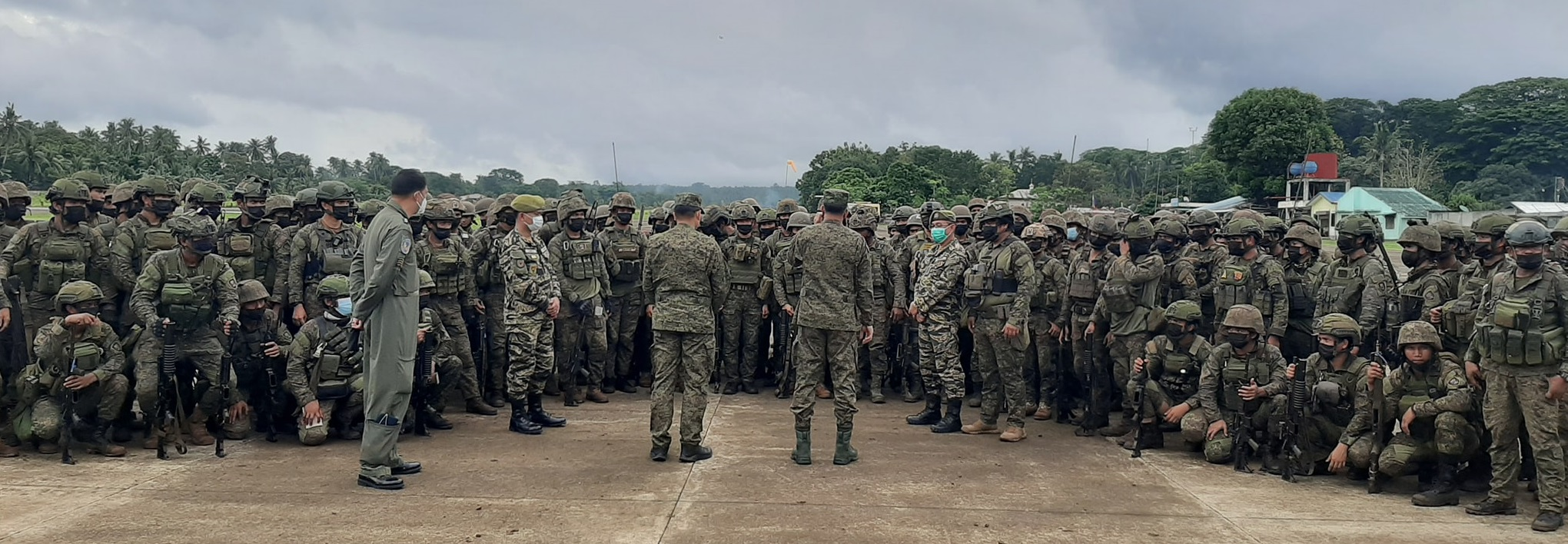
Sulu Commander Major General William N Gonzales extended his appreciation to the soldiers of the 11th Infantry Division Philippine Army and Joint Task Force

The Army has a total of 11 infantry divisions, composed of 2-4 infantry brigades. The infantry divisions are also part of the 6 Unified Commands of the AFP, and are responsible for overall infantry operations within their respective areas of responsibility.

- 1st Infantry "Tabak" Division
- 2nd Infantry "Jungle Fighter" Division
- 3rd Infantry "Spearhead" Division
- 4th Infantry "Diamond" Division
- 5th Infantry "Star" Division
- 6th Infantry "Kampilan" Division
- 7th Infantry "Kaugnay" Division
- 8th Infantry "Stormtroopers" Division
- 9th Infantry "Spear" Division
- 10th Infantry "Agila" Division
- 11th Infantry "Alakdan" Division

==== Combined Arms Brigade ====
The Army has one combined arms brigade, and also serves as a rapid deployment force, combined in one major unit, and serves as a major maneuver unit, capable of rapid mobilization and conventional warfare.

- 1st Brigade Combat Team "Aegis"

==== Armor, Cavalry and Mechanized Support units ====
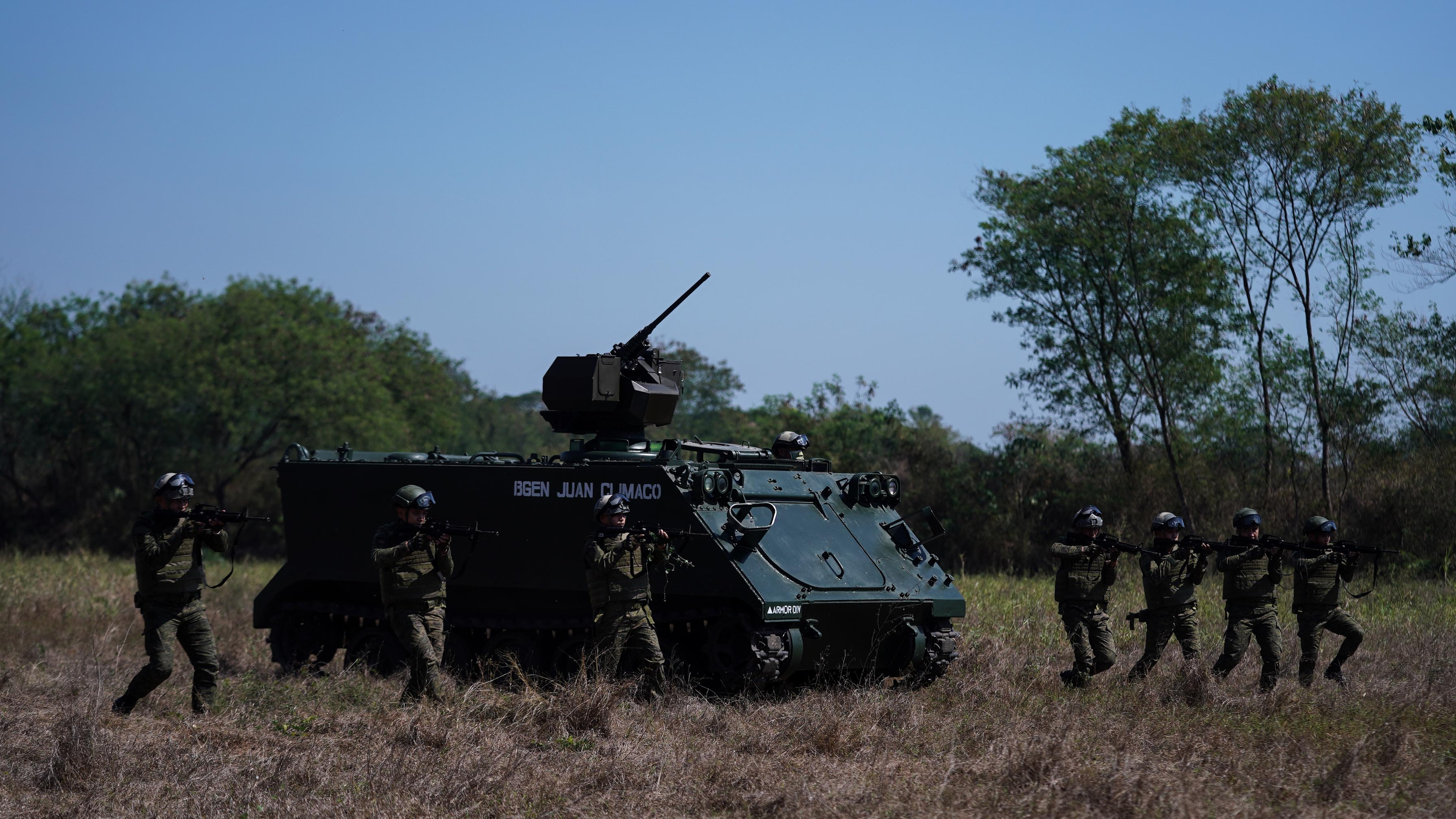
M-113 vehicle of the Philippine Army (PA) with a Remote Weapons Station (RWS)

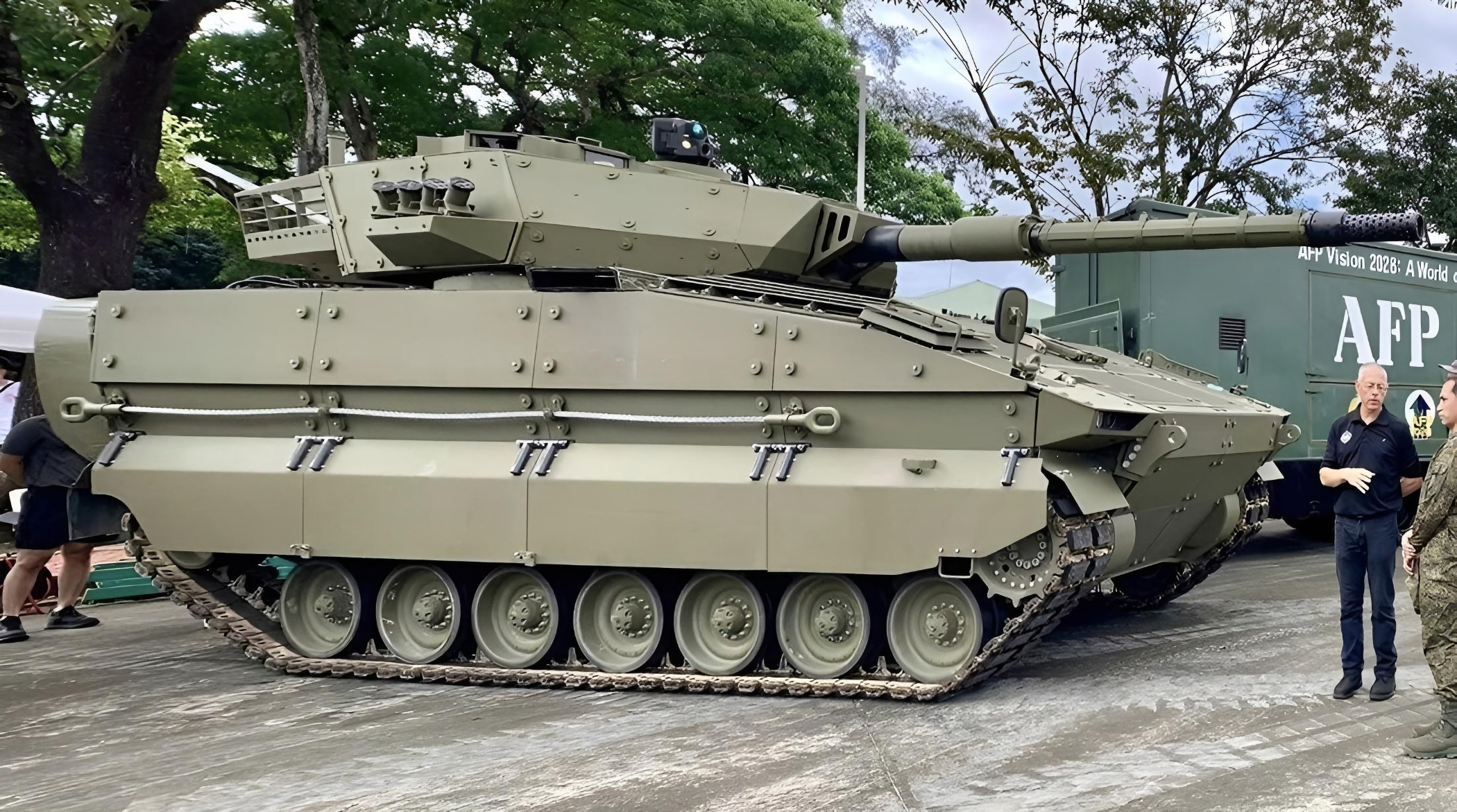
ASCOD 2 Sabrah Tank of the Philippine Army

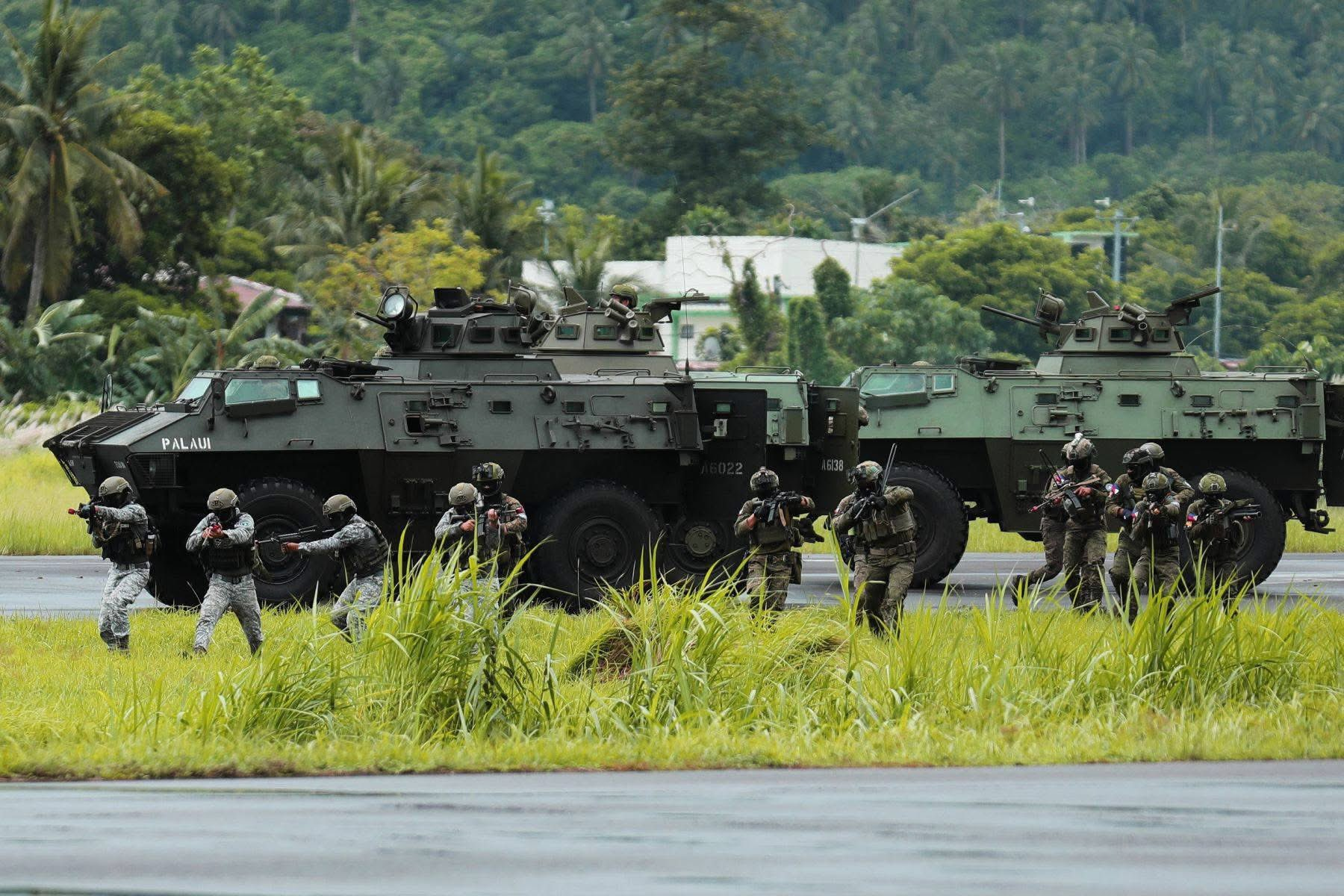
Simba 4x4 armored personnel carrier of the Philippine Army

The Army has one armor division, comprising two mechanized brigades, six mechanized battalions, seven separate cavalry squadrons, a maintenance unit and an aviation arm. The unit is responsible for mechanized fire support, as well as the deployment of mobile infantry brigades and armored reconnaissance units.

- Armor "Pambato" Division (formerly Mechanized Infantry Division)
  - 1st Mechanized Infantry (Maasahan) Brigade
  - 2nd Mechanized Infantry (Magbalantay) Brigade
    - 1st Tank (Masikan) Battalion
    - 1st Mechanized Infantry (Lakan) Battalion
    - 2nd Mechanized Infantry (Makasag) Battalion
    - 3rd Mechanized Infantry (Makatarungan) Battalion
    - 4th Mechanized Infantry (Kalasag) Battalion
    - 5th Mechanized Infantry (Kaagapay) Battalion
    - 6th Mechanized Infantry (Salaknib) Battalion
      - 1st Cavalry (Tagapanguna) Squadron
      - 2nd Cavalry (Kaagapay) Squadron
      - 3rd Cavalry (Masigasig) Squadron
      - 1st Cavalry (Rapido) Company (S)
      - 2nd Cavalry (Tagapaglingkod) Company (S)
      - 3rd Cavalry (Katapangan) Company (S)
      - 4th Cavalry (Karangalan) Company (S)
      - 5th Cavalry (Kasangga) Company (S)
      - 6th Cavalry (Paghiliugyon) Company (S)
      - 7th Cavalry (Masasanigan) Company (S)
    - Armor Maintenance (Masinop) Battalion

==== Artillery units ====
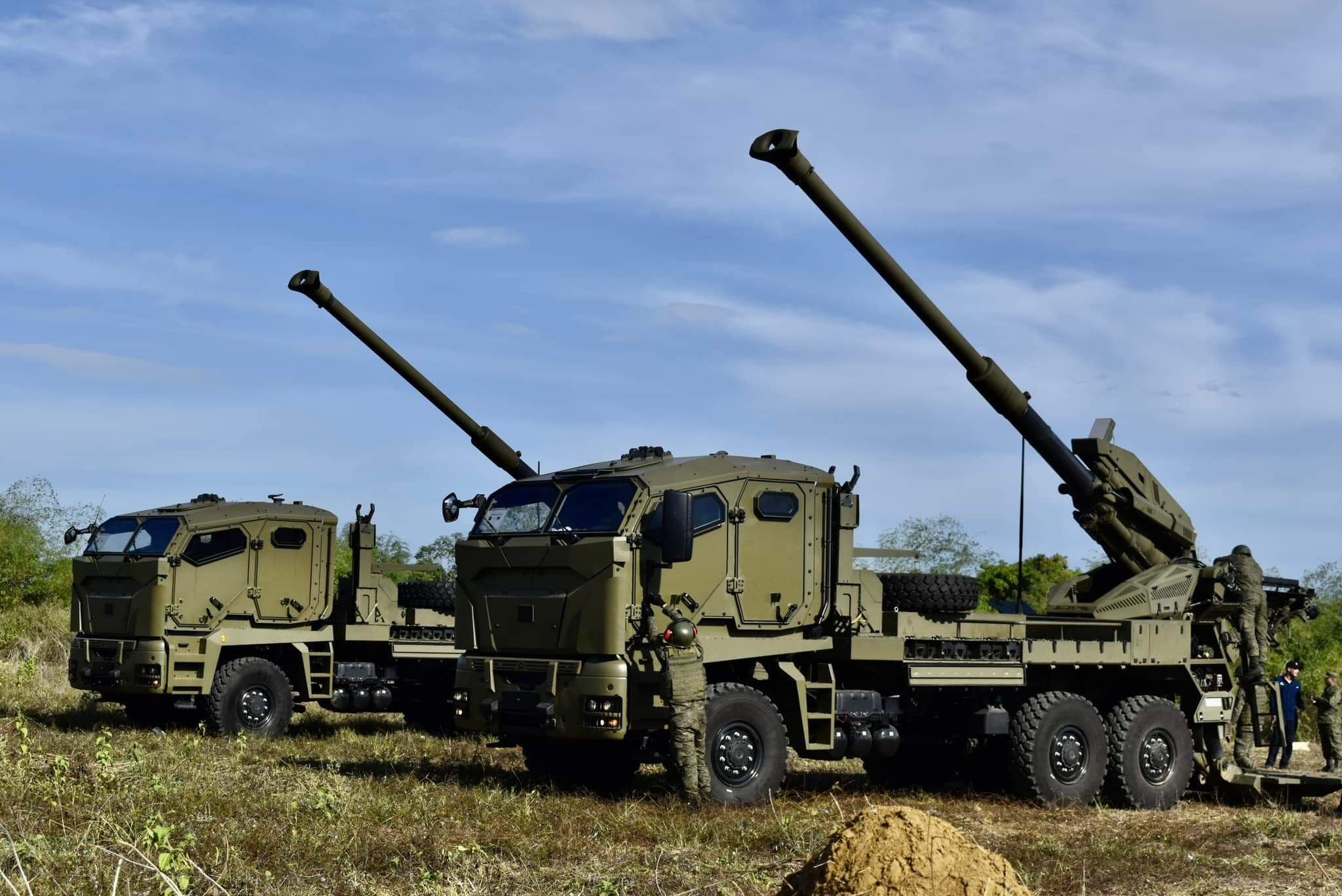
Philippine Army ATMOS 2000 Live Fire Exercise

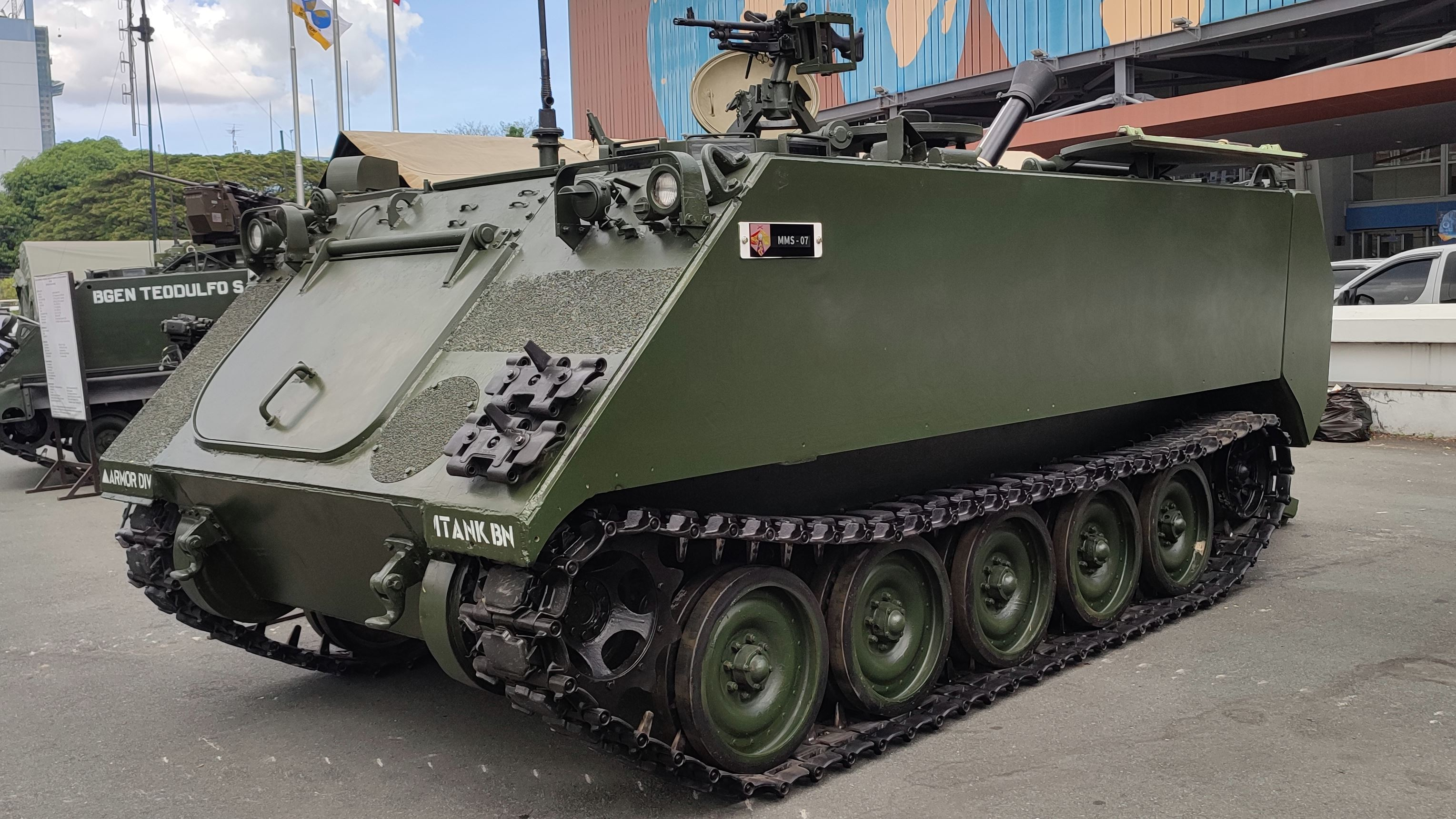
120 mm Cardom Mortar Carrier of the Philippine Army (PA)

The Army has one artillery regiment, comprising nine artillery battalions and six artillery battery units, responsible of overall artillery fire support to the army's maneuver units.

- Artillery "King of Battle" Regiment (AR)
  - 1st Field Artillery "Beat 'Em" Battalion
  - 2nd Field Artillery "First Round Accuracy" Battalion
  - 3rd Field Artillery "Hell Every Shell" Battalion
  - 4th Field Artillery "Strike from Afar" Battalion
  - 5th Field Artillery Battalion
  - 6th Field Artillery "Deadly Accurate" Battalion
  - 7th Field Artillery "Steel Rain" Battalion
  - 8th Field Artillery "Final Option" Battalion
  - 9th Field Artillery "Firestorm" Battalion
  - 10th Field Artillery "Rolling Thunder" Battalion (155mm Self Propelled)
    - 1st Field Artillery (155mm Self Propelled) Battery
    - 2nd Field Artillery (155mm Self Propelled) Battery
  - 1st Multiple Launch Rocket System Battery (1MLRS Btry)
  - 2nd Multiple Launch Rocket System Battery (2MLRS Btry)
  - 1st Land-based Missile System Battery (1LBMS Btry)
  - 1st Air Defense Artillery Battery (1ADA Btry)
  - 2nd Air Defense Artillery Battery (2ADA Btry)

==== Engineering units ====
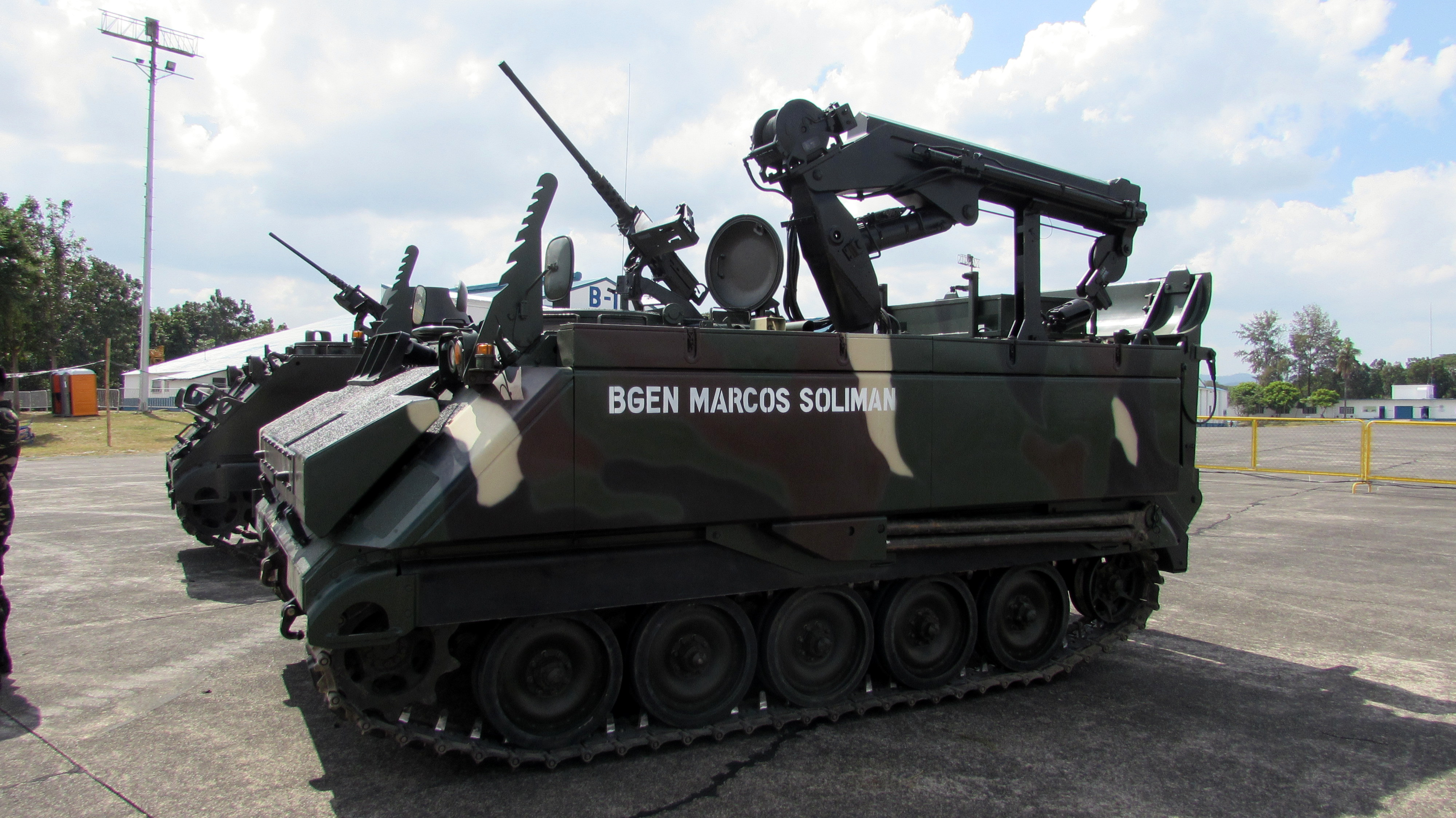
Philippine Army M113 Armored Recovery Vehicle (ARV)

The Army has 5 engineer brigades, responsible for overall engineering support, construction of army facilities, and counter-mobility operations.

- 51st Engineer "Primera Brigada" Brigade
  - 504th Engineer Combat Engineer "Mandirigtas" Battalion
  - 564th Engineer Construction "Tagabuklod" Battalion
  - 522nd Engineer Construction "Central Luzon Builders" Battalion
  - 548th Engineer Construction "Essayons" Battalion
  - 513th Engineer Construction "Nasiglat" Battalion
  - 514th Engineer Construction "Ang Gumagawa" Battalion
  - 565th Engineer Construction "Bikol Builders" Battalion
  - Engineer Support "Kaakibat" Company
- 52nd Engineer "Kaayadan" Brigade
  - 525th Combat Engineer Battalion
- 53rd Engineer "Visayas Builders" Brigade
- 54th Engineer "Sarangay" Brigade
  - 545th Engineer "Peaceseeker" Battalion
  - 547th Engineer "Agila" Battalion
  - 549th Engineer "Kapayapaan" Battalion
  - Engineer "Primemover" Support Company
  - Headquarters and Headquarters "Provider" Company
- 55th Engineer "Mobilizer" Brigade
  - 500th Combat Engineer Battalion
  - 501st Combat Engineer Battalion
  - 502nd Combat Engineer Battalion
  - 503rd Combat Engineer Battalion
- Engineer Support Company
- Combat Engineer School

==== Aviation unit ====
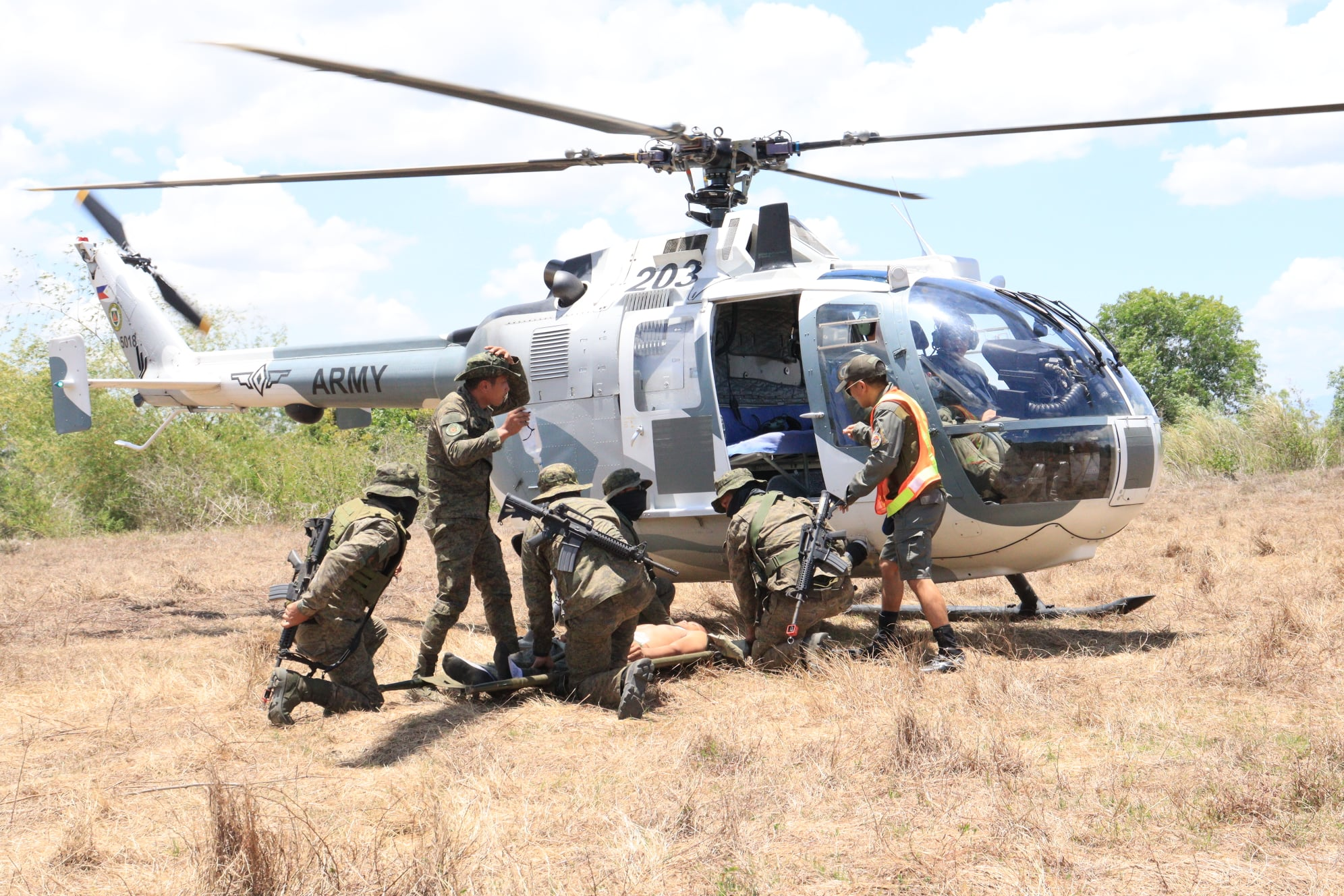
Bo-105M Helicopter of the Philippine Army (PA) Aviation Regiment conducting Casualty Evacuation (CASEVAC) Training

The Army has one aviation regiment responsible for reconnaissance and airborne operations such as aerial transport and medical evacuation duties.

- Aviation "Hiraya" Regiment

==== Combat Support units ====
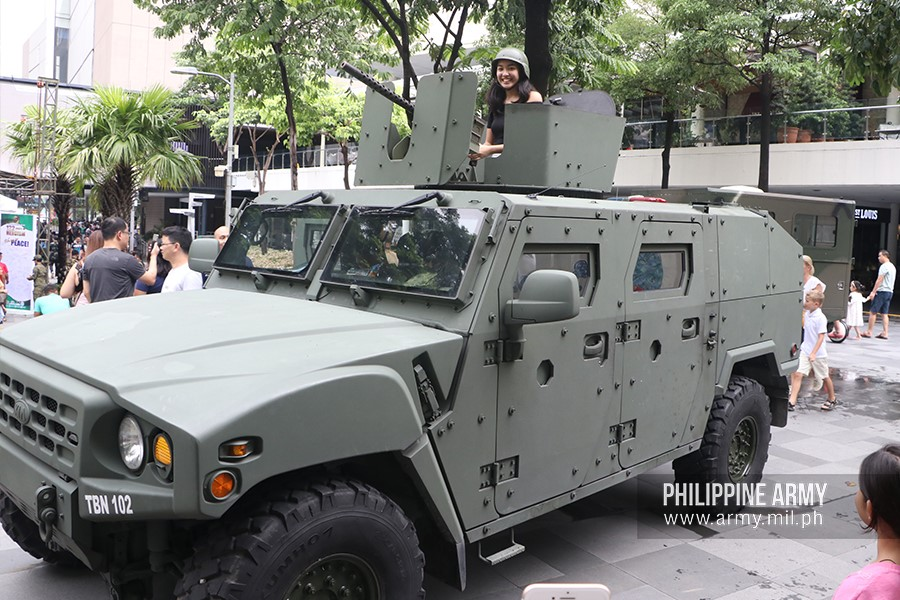
Philippine Army's Kia Raycolt KLTV light tactical vehicle

The Army has seven combat support units, responsible for overall combat support operations, ranging from communications, logistics, intelligence, ordinance disposal, enforcement, signalling, and services operations.

- Signal Regiment
- Civil-Military Operations Regiment
- 1st Logistics Support Brigade
- 191st Military Police Battalion
- Intelligence Regiment
- Army Explosive Ordnance Disposal Battalion
- Headquarters & Headquarters Service (Tagapaglaan) Battalion

==== Combat Service Support units ====
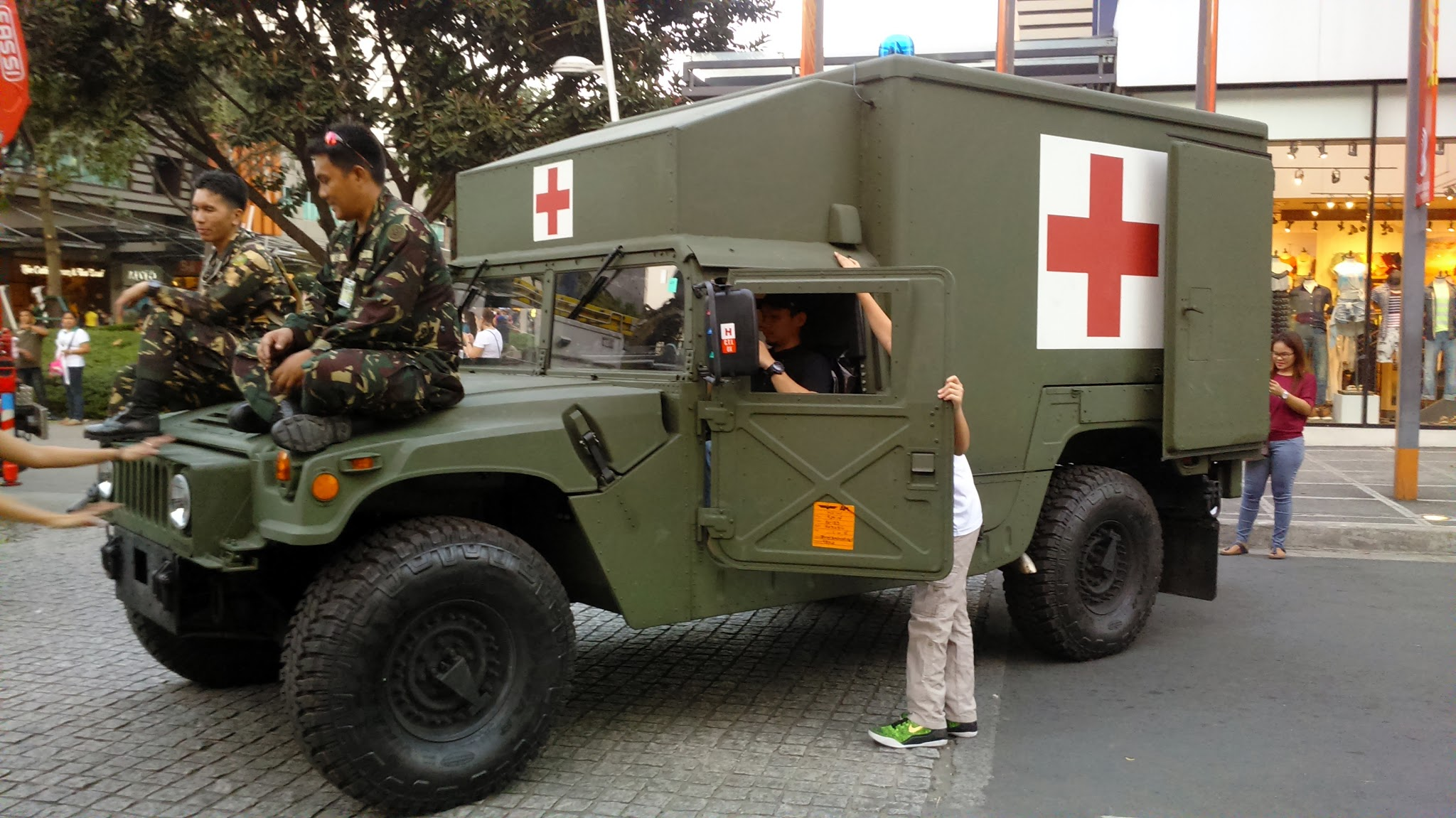
Philippine Army HUMVEE Ambulance shown during the Philippine Army's 118th Anniversary Exhibit at the Bonifacio Global City

The Army has 14 combat service support units, responsible for overall organizational support; as well as public, information, and military law affairs; security and escort operations; and medical, dental and religious services.

- Finance Center, Philippine Army
- Philippine Army Band (formally known as Headquarters Philippine Army Band)
- Philippine Army Nurse Corps
- Philippine Army Medical Corps
- Philippine Army Dental Service
- Philippine Army Security and Escort Battalion
- Office of the Chief Public Affairs
- The Armor School (Kahusayan)
- Philippine Army Medical Administrative Corps
- Philippine Army Veterinary Corps
- Judge Advocate General Service
- Corps of Professors
- Chief Chaplain Service

=== Special Operations Forces Units ===
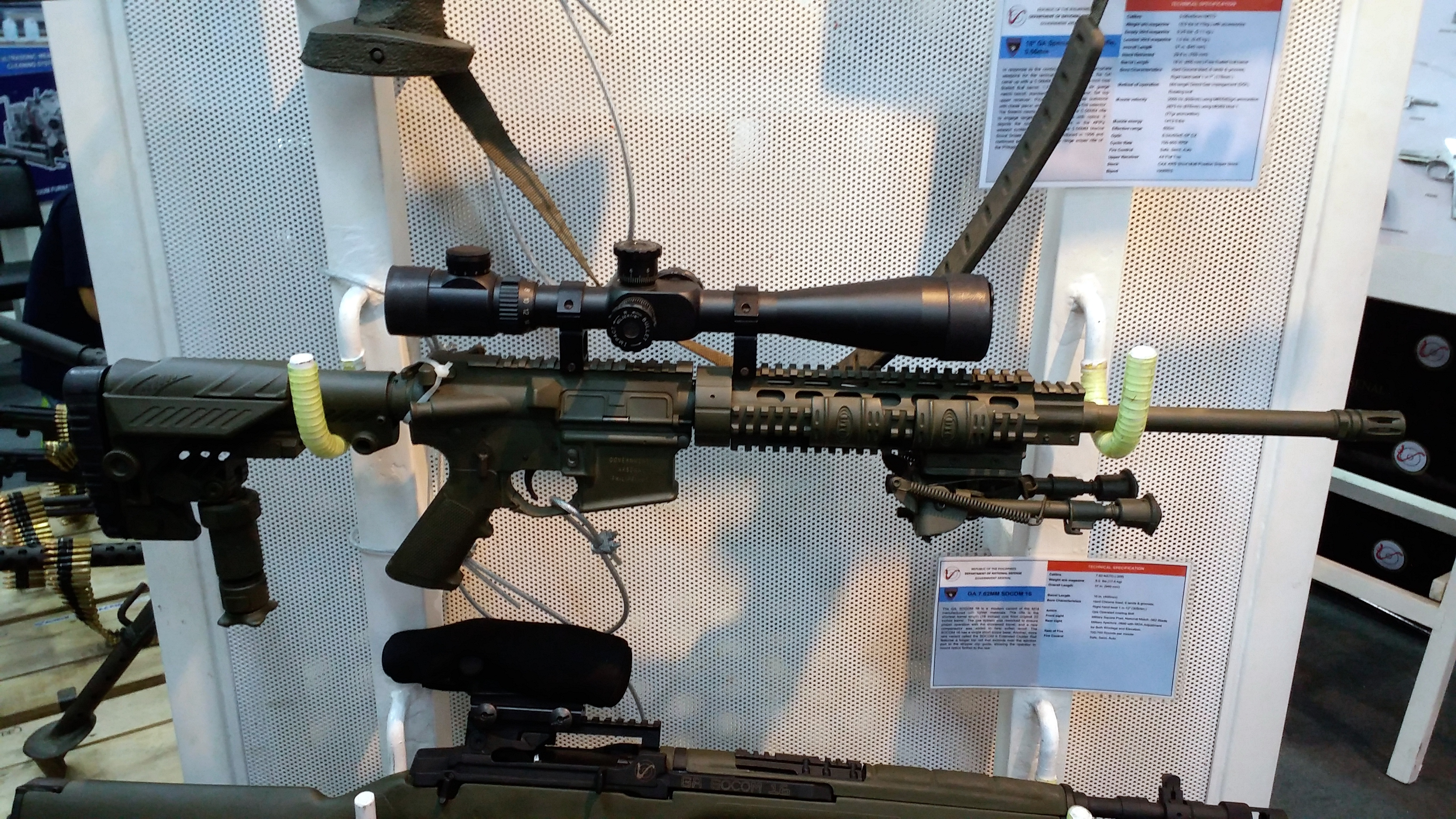
GA's Designated Marksman Rifle/Special Purpose Rifle (DMR/SPR) with an 18" barrel and optics

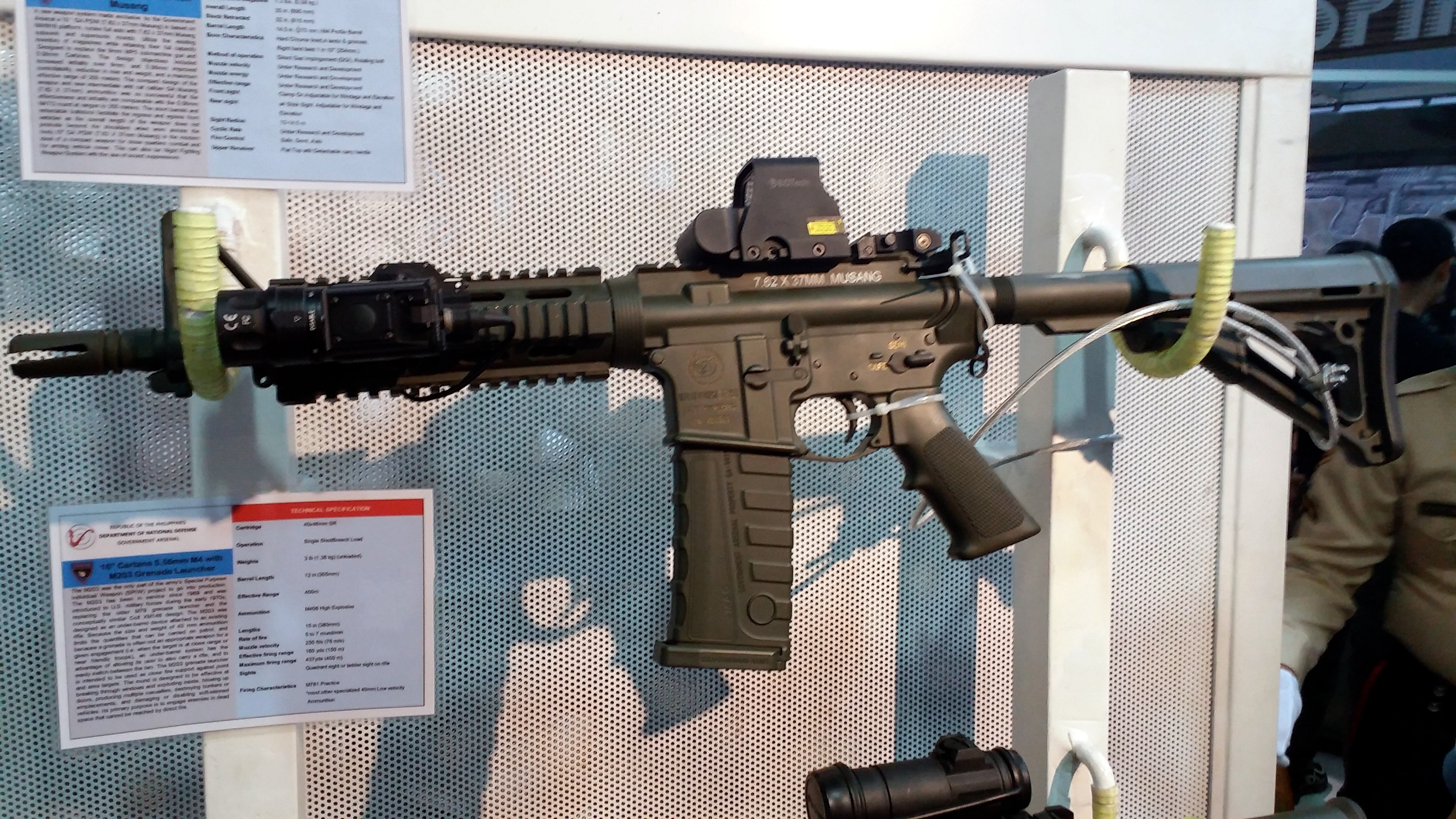
GA's Musang Personal Defense Weapon (PDW) with a 10" barrel chambered to fire the 7.62×37mm Musang round

The Philippine Army has three special operations regiments, all under the umbrella of the Special Operations Command, dedicated to special operations.

- First Scout Ranger Regiment (FSSR)
- Special Forces Regiment (Airborne) (SFR [A])
- Light Reaction Regiment (LRR)

== Rank structure ==
=== Officers ===
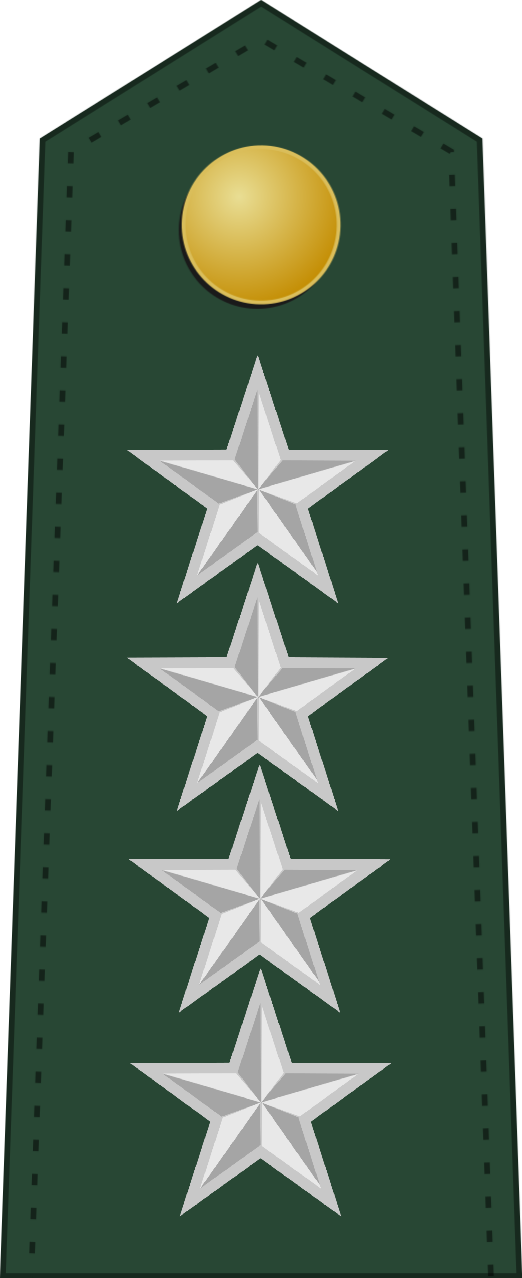
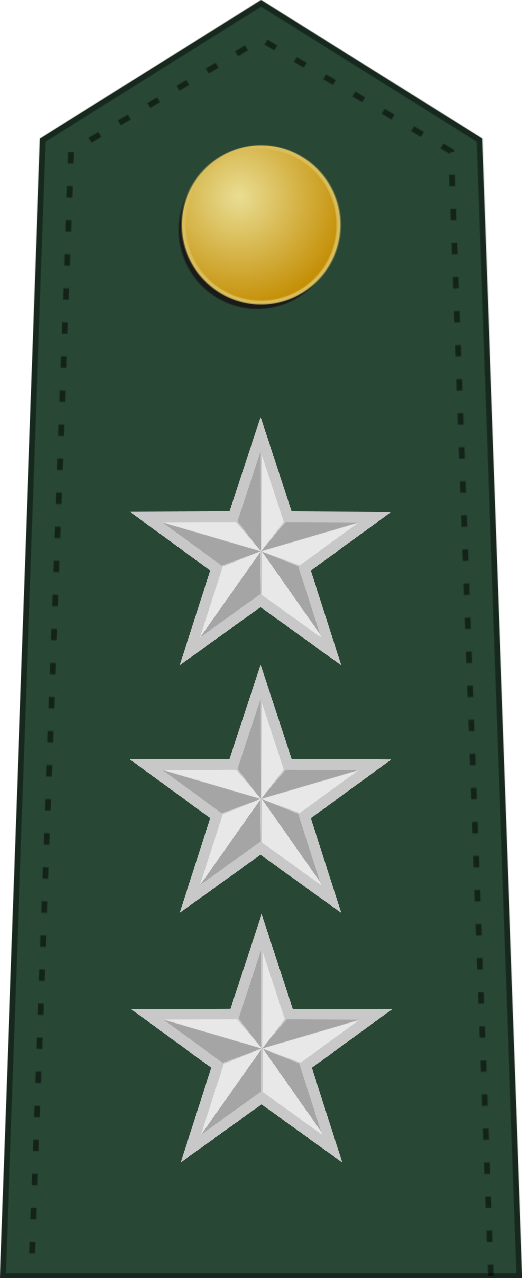
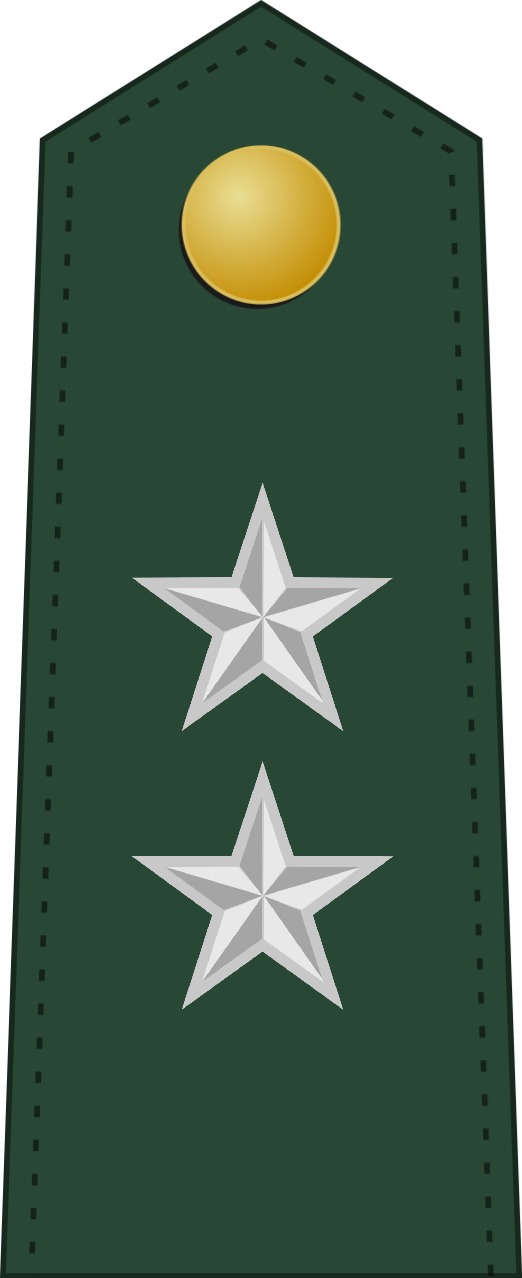
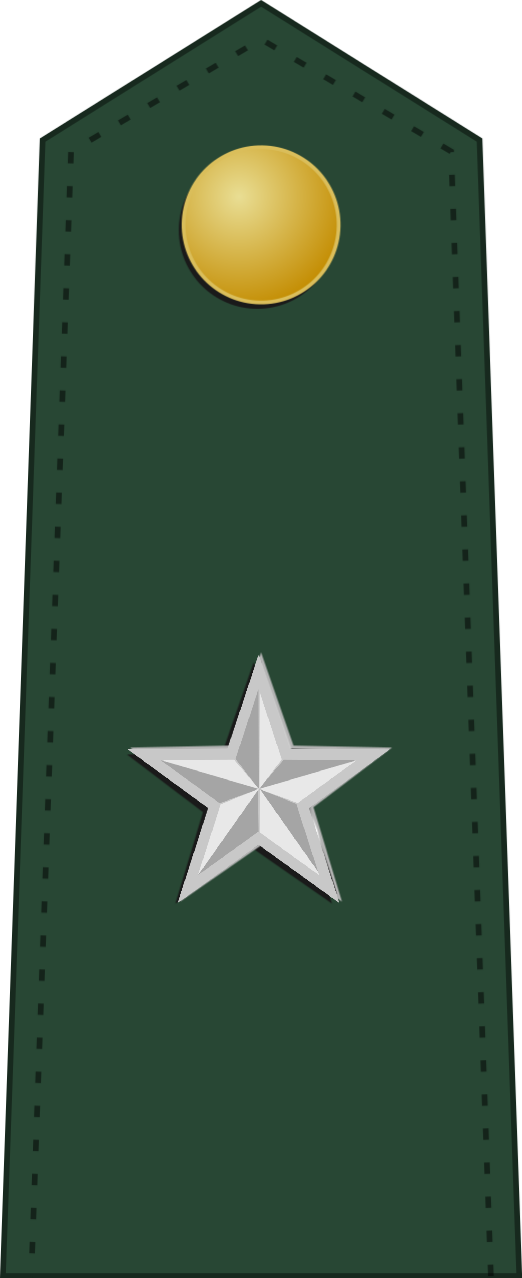
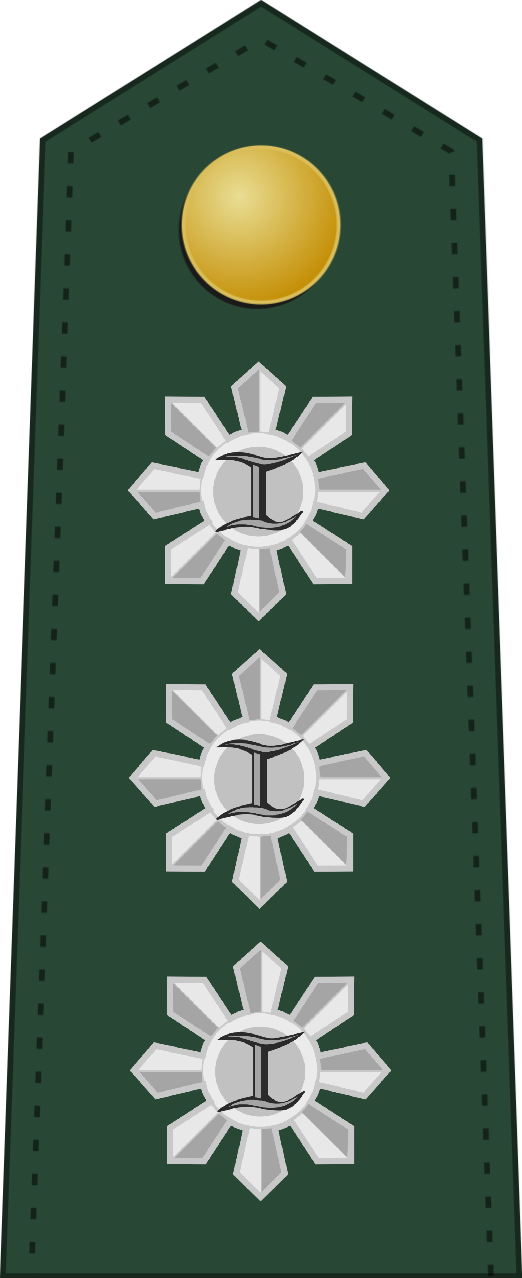
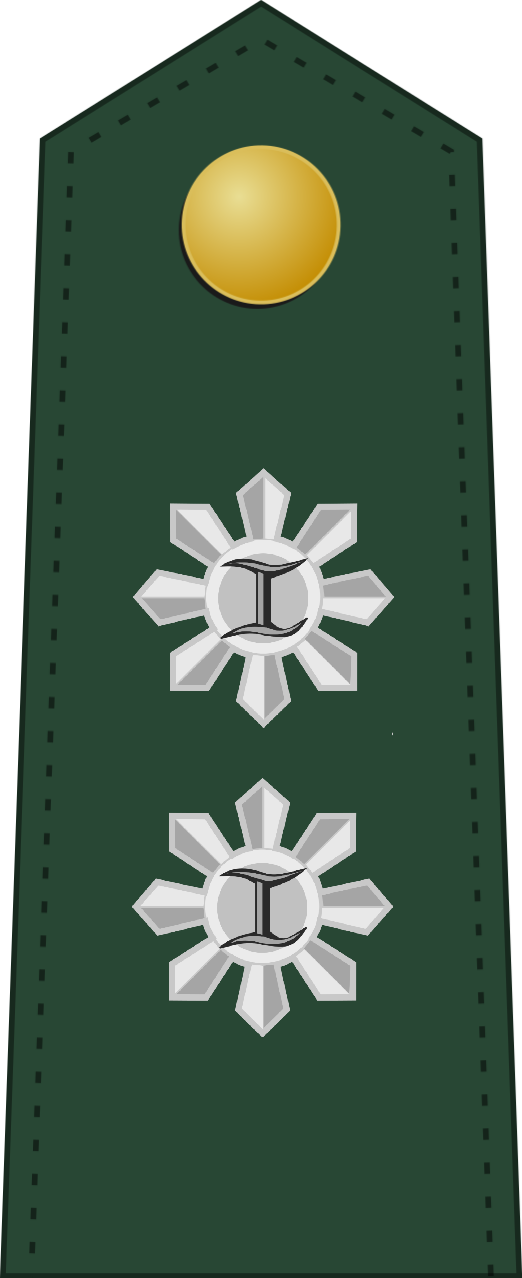
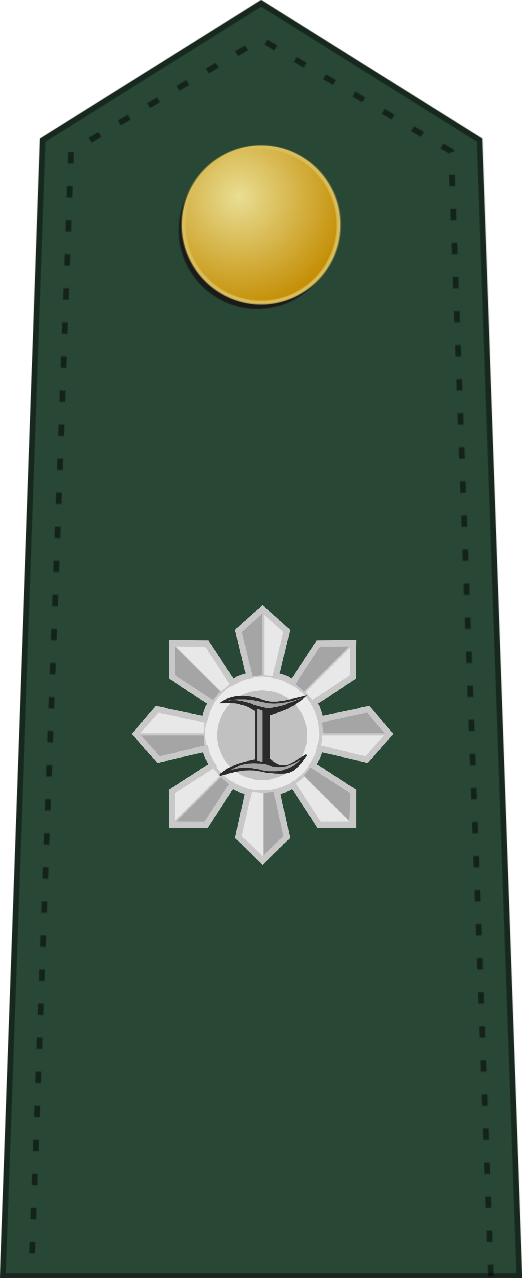
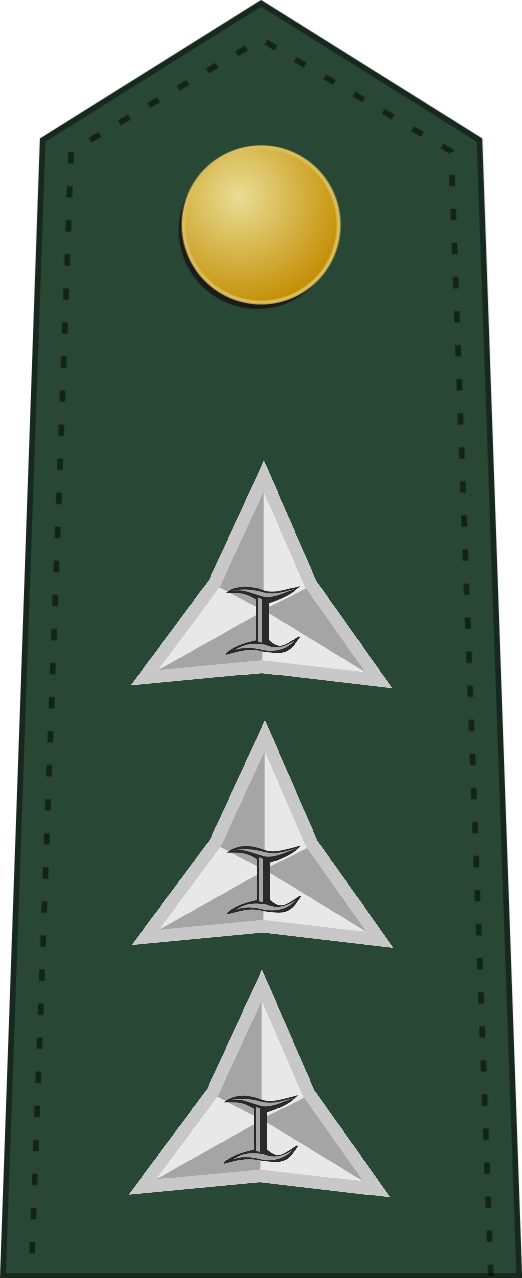
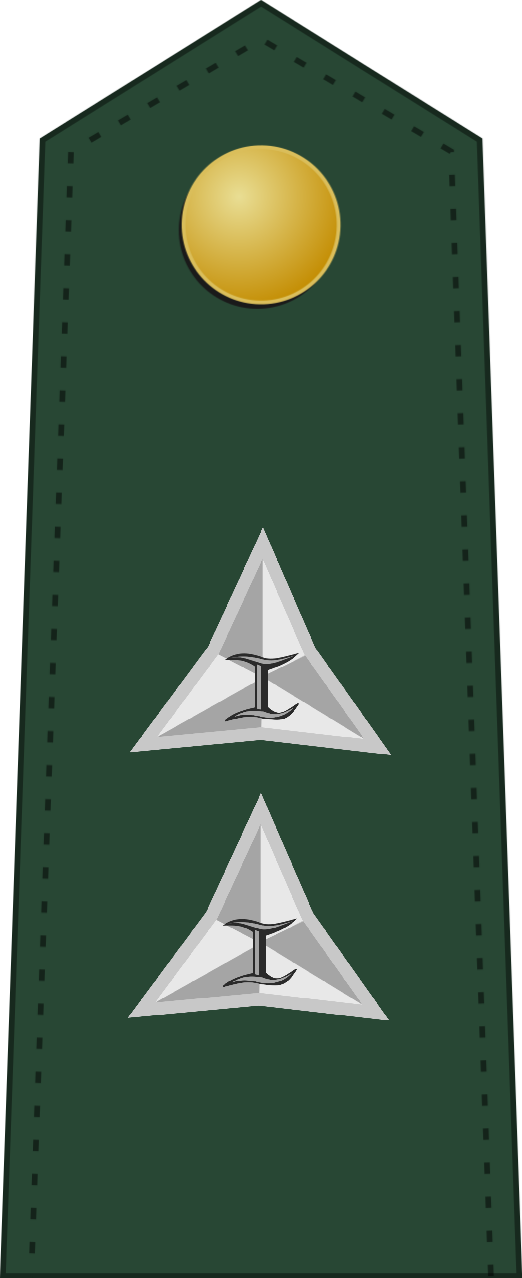
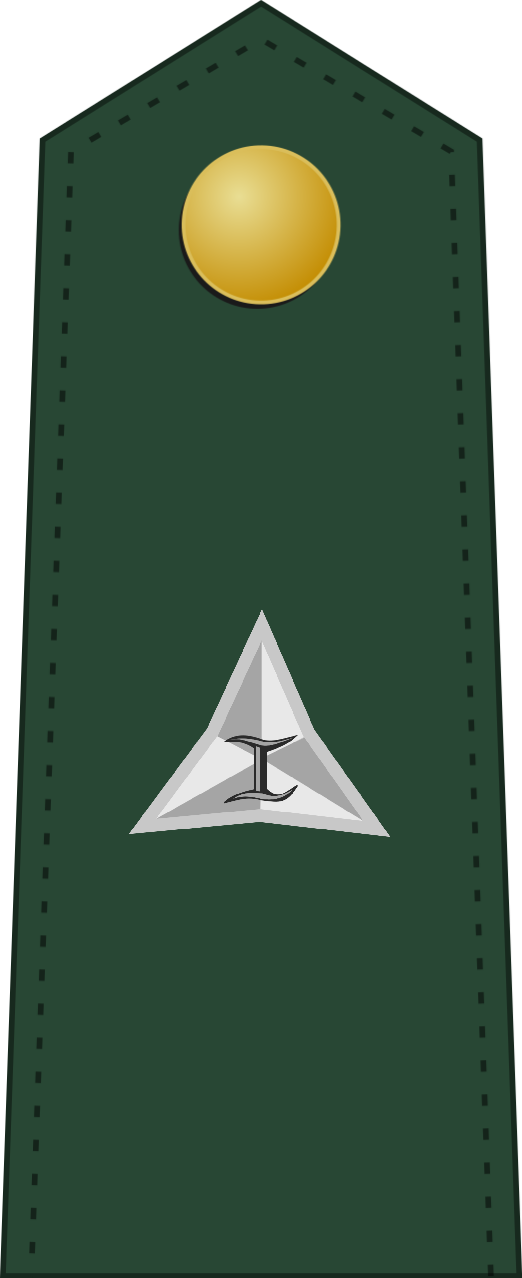
| Rank group | General / flag officers | | | | Senior officers | | | Junior officers |
|---|---|---|---|---|---|---|---|---|---|---|
| Philippine Army |
| Philippine Army | General | Lieutenant general | Major general | Brigadier general | Colonel | Lieutenant Colonel | Major | Captain | First lieutenant | Second lieutenant |

=== Enlisted ===
| Rank group | Senior NCOs | | | | | | Junior NCOs | Enlisted |
|---|---|---|---|---|---|---|---|---|---|
| Philippine Army |
| Philippine Army | Chief master sergeant | Senior master sergeant | Master sergeant | Technical sergeant | Staff sergeant | Sergeant | Corporal | Private first class | Private |

== Bases ==
The Philippine Army, being the dominant branch of the AFP, maintains a large number of bases throughout the country compared to the other branches. They have used these bases in support of their operations nationwide.

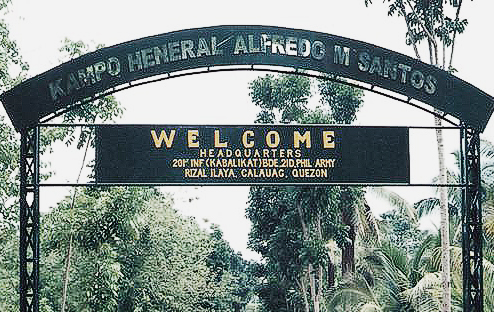
Entrance archway of Camp Alfredo M. Santos, Calauag, Quezon

Luzon
| Name (former name) | Location | Description |
| Camp General Emilio Aguinaldo (Camp Murphy) | Quezon City | GHQ, AFP |
| Camp General Rigoberto Atienza (Santolan Barracks) | Libis, Quezon City | |
| Fort Andres Bonifacio (Fort William McKinley) | Taguig City | HPA Headquarters, NCRRCDG, RESCOM, PA |
| Camp Melchor F. Dela Cruz | Upi, Gamu, Isabela | Headquarters, 5ID Headquarters, 2RCDG, RESCOM, PA |
| Fort General Gregorio H. Del Pilar | Baguio | Headquarters, CCAFP |
| Camp Lt. Tito B. Abat | Manaoag, Pangasinan | Headquarters, 1RCDG, RESCOM, PA |
| Fort Ramon Magsaysay | Nueva Ecija | Headquarters, 7ID Headquarters, SOCOM, PA Headquarters, SFR(A) Headquarters, LRR |
| Camp General Manuel Tinio | Cabanatuan | Combat Support School, ETC |
| Camp General Servillano S. Aquino | Tarlac City | Headquarters, SPTCOM Headquarters, 3RCDG, RESCOM, PA Camp Aquino Museum |
| Camp O'Donnell | Santa Lucia, Capas, Tarlac | Headquarters, AD Headquarters, ETC, PA |
| Camp Pablo Tecson (Philippine Constabulary Station Sibul) | San Miguel, Bulacan | Headquarters, 1FSSR |
| Camp General Mateo M. Capinpin | Tanay, Rizal | Headquarters, 2ID |
| Camp General Mariano Riego De Dios | Tanza, Cavite | Headquarters, RESCOM, PA |
| Camp General Alfredo M. Santos | Calauag, Quezon | |
| Camp Guillermo P. Nakar (Camp Wilhelm) | Lucena City | Headquarters, SOLCOM, AFP |
| Camp Elias Angeles | San Jose, Pili, Camarines Sur | Headquarters, 9ID |
| Camp Weene Martillana | San Jose, Pili, Camarines Sur | |
| Camp General Macario Sakay (Camp Elridge) | Los Baños, Laguna | Headquarters, 4RCDG, RESCOM, PA |
| Camp General Simeon A. Ola (Regan Barracks, Camp Bagong Ibalon) | Legazpi, Albay | Headquarters, 5RCDG, RESCOM, PA |
Visayas
| Camp Lapu-Lapu | Lahug, Cebu City | Headquarters, VISCOM, AFP Headquarters, 7RCDG, RESCOM, PA |
| Camp Major Jesus M. Jizmundo | Libas, Banga, Aklan | |
| Camp General Macario G. Peralta, Jr. | Jamindan, Capiz | Headquarters, 3ID |
| Camp General Adriano Hernandez | Dingle, Iloilo | Headquarters, 6RCDG, RESCOM, PA |
| Camp Tan Pedro Monteclaro | Igtuba, Miagao, Iloilo | |
| Camp Tirambulo | McKinley, Guihulngan, Negros Oriental | |
| Camp Leon Kilat | Tanjay, Negros Oriental | |
| Camp Ruperto K. Kangleon | Palo, Leyte | |
| Camp Jorge Downes | Ormoc City | HQ, 8RCDG, RESCOM, PA |
| Camp General Vicente Lukban | Catbalogan, Samar | Headquarters, 8ID |
| Camp General Martin Teofilo B. Delgado | Iloilo City | |
Mindanao
| Camp General Basilio Navarro | Zamboanga City | Headquarters, WESTMINCOM, AFP |
| Camp General Arturo T. Enrile | Malagutay, Zamboanga City | |
| Naval Station Felix Apolinario (Camp Panacan) | Panacan, Davao City | Headquarters, EASTMINCOM, AFP |
| Camp Edilberto Evangelista | Patag, Cagayan de Oro | Headquarters, 4ID Headquarters, 10RCDG, RESCOM, PA |
| Camp Major Cesar L. Sang-an | Pulacan, Labangan, Zamboanga del Sur | Headquarters, 1ID |
| Camp Colonel Oscar F. Natividad | Manolo Fortich, Bukidnon | |
| Camp Osito D. Bahian | Impalambong, Malaybalay, Bukidnon | |
| Camp Ranao | Marawi City | |
| Camp Allere | Salvador, Lanao del Norte | |
| Camp Datu Duma Sinsuat | Barira, Maguindanao del Norte | |
| Camp Brig. Gen. Gonzalo H. Siongco | Datu Odin Sinsuat, Maguindanao del Norte | Headquarters, 6ID Headquarters, 12RCDG, RESCOM, PA |
| Camp Robert Eduard M. Lucero | Nasapian, Carmen, Cotabato | |
| Camp Brig. Gen. Hermenegildo A. Agaab | Malandag, Malungon, Sarangani | |
| Camp Climaco Pintoy | Suarez, Iligan | |
| Maria Cristina Military Reservation | Maria Cristina, Iligan | |
| Torrey Barracks | Malabang, Lanao del Sur | |
| Camp Amai Pakpak (Camp Keithley) | Marawi City | |
| Camp Cabunbata | Cabunbata, Isabela, Basilan | |
| Camp General Manuel T. Yan Sr. | Tuboran, Mawab, Davao de Oro | Headquarters, 10ID |
| Camp San Gabriel | Mintal, Davao City | Headquarters, 11RCDG, RESCOM, PA |
| Camp General Teodulfo Bautista | Busbus, Jolo, Sulu | Headquarters, 11ID |
| Camp Romualdo C. Rubi | Bancasi, Butuan | Headquarters, 15RCDG, RESCOM, PA |
| Camp Datu Lipus Makapandong | Prosperidad, Agusan del Sur | |

== Equipment ==
The Philippine Army has made use of its existing equipment to fulfill its mandate while modernization projects are underway. The Republic Act No. 7898 declares the policy of the State to modernize the military to a level where it can effectively and fully perform its constitutional mandate to uphold the sovereignty and preserve the patrimony of the republic. The law, as amended, has set conditions that should be satisfied when the defense department procures major equipment and weapon systems for the army.

== See also ==
- Philippine Army F.C.
