= 1st Brigade Combat Team (Philippines) =

- Active: 15 December 2018
- Country: Philippines
- Branch: Philippine Army
- Type: Combined Arms Brigade
- Role: Conventional Warfare, Rapid Deployment
- Size: 1 Brigade
- Part of: Under the Philippine Army, attached with the 11th Infantry Division
- Garrison/HQ: Fort Magsaysay, Nueva Ecija
- Anniversaries: 15 December

Commanders
- Current commander: Col. Leodevic B. Guinid, AFP

The 1st Brigade Combat Team "Aegis", Philippine Army, is the Philippine Army's current primary combined arms and rapid deployment unit. It was formed out of a new concept that was among the lessons learned from the Battle of Marawi against terrorist forces in urban environment. It would also be the primary unit for territorial defense.

The maneuver components of the 1BCT are two infantry battalions and one mechanized infantry battalion plus maneuver support consisting of specialized enablers such as field artillery and engineer combat battalions, reconnaissance company and units from signal, intelligence, civil-military operations, military police, explosive ordnance, CBRN (chemical biological radiological and nuclear), and sustainment components composed of a forward service support unit and a forward medical platoon. It should have around 1,500 officers and enlisted personnel at full strength.

== History ==
It is expected that the unit will undergo its first joint military training with US forces in the upcoming Salaknib and Balikatan Exercises slated for 2019.

On 30 May 2019, it has been reported by Philippine Media that the 1st Brigade Combat Team will be assigned to the 11th Infantry Division in Sulu to aid in the operations against the Abu Sayyaf. These troops arrived on board the BRP Tarlac (LD-601) on 31 May 2019.

On 28 June 2019, two suicide bombers detonated themselves at the gate of the tactical command post of the First Brigade Combat Team (1BCT) in Sitio Tanjung, Barangay Kajatian, Sulu. The blast killed three soldiers and three civilians as well as the bombers. It is believed that this is the first instance of a suicide bombing conducted by native Filipinos.

== Current Units (as of December 2018) ==
The following are the units attached with the 1st Brigade Combat Team:

- Headquarters and Headquarters Company (HHC)
- 45th Infantry "Gallant" Battalion - from the 5th Infantry Division;
- 92nd Infantry "Tanglaw Diwa" Battalion - from the 2nd Infantry Division;
- 6th Mechanized Infantry "Salaknib" Battalion - from the Mechanized Infantry Division;
- 9th Field Artillery Battalion (Provisional) - from the Army Artillery Regiment;
- 71st Division Reconnaissance Company - from the 7th Infantry Division;
- 500th Engineering Combat Battalion (Provisional)
- Brigade Support Battalion (Provisional) formerly 2FSSU from Army Support Command;
- Brigade Signal Company, 7th Signal Battalion - from the Army Signal Regiment;
- 1st Civil Military Operations Platoon, 2nd CMO Company, 7th CMO Battalion - from the 7th Infantry Division;
- 1st Military Police Platoon, 7th MP Company - from the 7th Infantry Division;
- CBRN Team, EOO Battalion - from Army Support Command
- EOD Platoon, EOD Battalion - from Army Support Command

== List of Commanding Officers ==
- BGen. Leopoldo A. Imbang Jr. AFP (15 December 2018 – 3 April 2020)
- BGen. Benjamin G. Batara Jr. AFP (3 April 2020 – 22 December 2020)
- BGen. Ignatius N. Patrimonio AFP (22 December 2020 – 23 February 2022)
- Col. Jose Vladimir R. Cagara AFP (23 February 2022 – 23 May 2022) (acting)
- BGen. Leodevic B. Guinid AFP (23 May 2022 – Present)
