= 9th Infantry Division (Philippines) =

- Unit Seal of the 9ID.
- Active: October 1, 2004 – Present
- Country: Philippines
- Branch: Philippine Army
- Type: Infantry
- Role: Conventional Warfare; Anti-Guerrilla Operations
- Size: 3 Brigade
- Part of: Philippine Army (Since 2004)
- Garrison/HQ: Camp Elias Angeles, Pili, Camarines Sur, Philippines
- Nickname: Spear Division
- Motto: Second to None
- Mascot: Spear
- Anniversaries: October 1

Commanders
- Current commander: BGen. Ariel M. Reyes, PA. (Acting Commander)
- Notable commanders: BGen Santiago Prejido AFP

Insignia
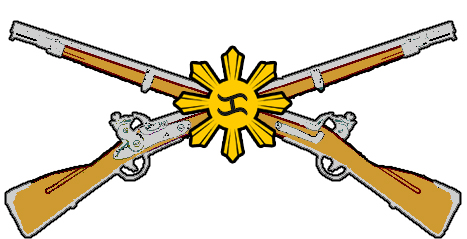
- Armed Forces Occupational Specialty Insignia

The 9th Infantry Division, Philippine Army, known officially as the Spear Division, is the Philippine Army's primary infantry unit assigned to combat communist insurgency in the Bicol Region.

== History ==
The 9th Infantry Brigade (S) PA was activated on August 15, 2002, pursuant to General Orders nr 456 HPA dated September 2, 2002. On same order, 901st and 902nd Infantry Brigades were activated, with the personnel and equipment of the unfilled 202nd and 203rd Infantry Brigades, 2ID, respectively serving as their nucleus. Moreover, 2nd IB, 22nd IB and 42nd IB were reassigned from 2ID to the 9th Brigade (Sep) to constitute as the initial organic Battalions of the Bde (Sep) while 31st IB and two (2) Batteries of 4FAB and two (2) Companies of LABde were also placed under OPCON of the Brigade (Sep).

On January 12, 2004, the 9th Infantry Division (Provisional) was activated pursuant to GO Nr 56, HPA dated January 26, 2004. It was then under the Command of MAJ GENERAL JOHN D BOLHAYON AFP who can be credited as the 1st Commanding General of the Division (Provisional). It was during his time that initial measures were made to establish the Division Headquarters at Camp Elias Angeles at Brgy. San Jose, Pili, Camarines Sur. However, initial developments and camp structures, which were newly constructed, were heavily damaged and flattened by three (3) successive strong typhoons that struck the Bicol Region, namely: YOYONG, WINNIE, and KIKAY in November 2004.

On October 1, 2004, the 9th Infantry Division (P), was made a regular Infantry Division, PA pursuant to GO Nr 517, HPA dated October 6, 2004.

== Mission ==
Their mission is to conduct sustained Internal Security Operations (ISO) in the Bicol Region, excluding Masbate (8ID), to neutralize the Southern Tagalog Regional Party Committee (STRPC) and the armed wing of the Communist Party of the Philippines (CPP), the New Peoples Army (NPA) in order to create a physically and psychologically sound environment conducive for development and commerce of the Bicol Region.

== Current units ==
The following are the Brigades that are under the 9th Infantry Division:

- 901st Infantry "Fight 'Em" Brigade
- 902nd Infantry "Fight and Serve" Brigade
- 903rd Infantry "Patriot" Brigade

The following are the Battalions that are under the 9th Infantry Division:

- 2nd Infantry "Second to None" Battalion
- 83rd Infantry "Matikas" Battalion
- 42nd Infantry "Tagapagtanggol" Battalion
- 49th Infantry "Good Samaritans" Battalion
- 9th Infantry "Sandigan" Battalion
- 31st Infantry "Charge" Battalion
- 22nd Infantry "Valor" Battalion
- 65th Infantry "Stalwart" Battalion

== Operations ==
- Anti-guerrilla operations against the New People's Army.
- Anti-terrorist operations against local terrorists operating in their AOR.
