= 11th Infantry Division (Philippines) =

11th Infantry (Alakdan) Division
- Alakdan Division
- Coat of Arms of the 11th Infantry Division
- Active: December 18, 2018 – Present
- Country: Philippines
- Allegiance: Republic of the Philippines
- Branch: Philippine Army
- Type: Infantry
- Role: Conventional Warfare Anti-Terrorist Operations
- Size: 3 Brigades
- Part of: The AFP Western Mindanao Command (Since 2018)
- Garrison/HQ: Kuta Heneral Teodulfo Bautista, Barangay Busbus, Jolo, Sulu
- Nickname: Alakdan Division
- Mascot: Scorpion
- Anniversaries: December 17

Commanders
- Current Commander: MGen Leonardo I. Peña, PA
- Notable Commanders: MGen Ignatius N. Patrimonio PA; MGen William N. Gonzales PA; MGen Corleto S. Vinluan Jr. PA; MGen Divino Rey C. Pabayo Jr. PA

The 11th Infantry Division, Philippine Army, also called the Alakdan Division, is one of the Philippine Army's infantry units in Mindanao. Currently still forming, the Division is expected to complete its equipment and manpower requirements by 2022. It is the youngest of all the infantry divisions of the Army.

== War on Terrorism ==
On 17 December 2018, President Duterte, accompanied by Defense Secretary Delfin Lorenzana, led the activation of the 11th Infantry ‘Alakdan’ (Scorpion) Division at Kuta Heneral Teodulfo Bautista, headquarters of Joint Task Force Sulu in Barangay Bus-Bus, Jolo, Sulu.

Composed of units already present in Sulu working under Joint Task Force Sulu, the various units were formed into a new Division dedicated in fighting the ISIS affiliated terrorist groups in the region.

On 28 January 2019, following the bombing of the Cathedral of Our Lady of Mount Carmel in Jolo on 27 January 2019, the Armed Forces of the Philippines launched an all-out assault on known Abu Sayyaf bases in the area. Led by the 1st Scout Ranger Regiment, the 11th Infantry Division were given a supporting role and engaged the terrorists trying to flee the combat zone.

It has been reported by Philippine Media on 30 May 2019 that the 1st Brigade Combat Team will be assigned to the Division to aid in the operations against the Abu Sayyaf. These troops arrived on board the BRP Tarlac (LD-601) on 31 May 2019.

On 28 June 2019, two suicide bombers detonated themselves at the gate of the tactical command post of the First Brigade Combat Team (1BCT) in Sitio Tanjung, Barangay Kajatian, Sulu. The blast killed three soldiers and three civilians as well as the bombers. It is believed that this is the first instance of a suicide bombing conducted by native Filipinos.

A British businessman, Allan Hyrons, 70, and his wife, Wilma, were rescued by elite troops of the 2nd Special Forces Battalion with support from the 11th Infantry Alakdan Division who found them abandoned by kidnappers at the forested areas of Mt. Piahan, boundary of Barangays Silangkan and Kaha in Parang, Sulu in the morning of 25 November 2019.

An argument with an inebriated soldier resulted in the deaths of three members of the 9th Field Artillery Battalion, Army Artillery Regiment, at Barangay Liang in Patikul on 31 January 2020. Corporal Jack Indap shot dead two officers, Major Rael Gabot and First Lieutenant Ryan Lamoste, as they confronted him for being drunk on duty. Indap was later killed by responding personnel. The 9th Field Artillery Battalion is attached to the 11th Infantry Division as one of its support units.

On 29 June 2020, four intelligence officers believed assigned to the 11th Military Intelligence Battalion were killed in a friendly fire incident by Philippine National Police personnel manning a checkpoint in Jolo, Sulu.

On 23 August 2020, two powerful bomb explosions occurred on Jolo island in Sulu. Six civilians, seven soldiers, and a police officer were killed in the blasts that went off in a busy street while 75 other people – including at least 48 civilians, 21 soldiers, and six police officers – were injured. Islamic State militants have claimed responsibility.

To improve coordination with Philippine Navy and Air Force units, the Division conducted the weeklong LUPAH SUG 01-2021 Exercises. Ended on 19 February 2021, the exercise sought to solve the difficulties shown during Operation Perfect Storm 2 conducted in 2020.

Newly organized 101st Infantry "Sajahitra" Battalion has completed its training at the 11th Division Training School in Camp Bud Datu, Barangay Tagbak, Indanan, Sulu on June 6, 2022. This new unit will be added to the division.

== Mission ==
The 11th Infantry (Alakdan) Division, Philippine Army conducts military and rescue operations against the terrorist group, Abu Sayyaf, known to operate in the area.

== Area of responsibility ==
The Division has operational responsibility over the Sulu Archipelago consisting of the provinces of Basilan and Sulu. The entire region is part of the Bangsamoro Autonomous Region in Muslim Mindanao (BARMM).

== Seal ==
The official seal of the civision is an irregular hexagon divided in half with a scorpion (Filipino: Alakdan) over a green field on top-left and two crossed bolos and a kris, made to look like the Roman Numeral of eleven, over a brown field on the lower-right.

== Lineage of commanding generals ==
- MGen Divino Rey C. Pabayo Jr., PA – (17 December 2018 – 3 July 2019)
- MGen Corleto S. Vinluan Jr., PA – (3 July 2019 – 18 August 2020)
- MGen William S. Gonzalez, PA – (18 August 2020 – 23 February 2022)
- MGen Ignatius N. Patrimonio, PA – (23 February 2022 – 14 August 2024)
- MGen Leonardo I. Peña, PA – (14 August 2024 – Present)

== Units ==
Main Units:

- 1101st Infantry "Gagandilan" Brigade - formed from elements of the 101st Infantry Brigade;
- 1102nd Infantry "Ganarul" Brigade - formed from elements of the 104th Infantry Brigade;
- 1103rd Infantry "Kalis" Brigade
  - 21st Infantry "Invincible" Battalion - originally with the 501st Infantry Brigade
  - 32nd Infantry "Daredevil" Battalion - reassigned
  - 34th Infantry "Reliable" - Operational Control 6th Infantry "Kampilan" Division
  - 35th Infantry "Makamandag" Battalion - reassigned
  - 41st Infantry "Partner for Peace" Battalion - originally with the 501st Infantry Brigade
  - 45th Infantry "Gallant" Battalion - from the 5th Infantry Division;
  - 100th Infantry "Kalasag" Battalion - as of 6 June 2022
  - 101st Infantry "Sajahitra" Battalion - as of 6 June 2022
  - 104th Infantry "Para sa Bayan" Battalion

Attached Units:

  - 8th Field Artillery Battalion (Provisional) - from the Army Artillery Regiment;
  - 545th Engineering Combat Battalion
  - 15th Forward Service Support Unit
  - CBRN Team, EOO Battalion - from Army Support Command
  - EOD Platoon, EOD Battalion - from Army Support Command

Support Units:

- 11th Military Intelligence Battalion - formerly the 11th Military Intelligence Company. 1st Military Intelligence Battalion;
- 15th Civil Military Operations Battalion - formed from existing CMO contingents in Sulu;
- 11th Division Training School (11DTS);
- 11th Services Support Battalion
- 111th Division Reconnaissance Company (111DRC) - formed from the unfilled 12th DRC.
- 112th Division Reconnaissance Company (112DRC)
- 113th Division Reconnaissance Company (113DRC)
- 11th Signal Battalion - newly activated as of 1 December 2018

== See also ==
- Armed Forces of the Philippines
- Philippine Army
- 11th Division (Philippines)
