= Defiant class =

Defiant class may refer to:

- Defiant-class patrol vessel a class of patrol vessels to be built for small Caribbean nations, based on the Damen Stan 2606 patrol vessels
- Defiant-class patrol vessel (Metal Shark) a class of 38 foot patrol vessels built by Metal Shark Boats
