= Rigid buoyant boat =

Type of boat

The rigid buoyant boat (RBB) is a light-weight but high-performance and high-capacity boat. Based on the concept of a rigid-hulled inflatable boat (RHIB), it has a tube/sponson manufactured from a solid material such as moulded polyethylene or aluminium which is much more robust than the fabrics commonly used. Boats with foam-filled collars such as the secure all-around flotation equipped (SAFE) boats employed by the US Coast Guard can also be classified as Rigid Buoyant Boats rather than "true" RHIBs, as the collar is solid foam rather than inflated. The handling tends to be very similar to a RHIB; likewise they will remain afloat (buoyant) even if completely flooded. Aluminium RBBs tend to be bespoke (custom-made to specification) or low-volume products whilst the tooling cost of rotomolded polyethylene boats tends to require these to be higher-volume products. At least three manufacturers are producing rotomolded boats of this type. One supplier has demonstrated the robustness of the boats by dropping one from a crane onto a concrete car park. The U.S. Navy's small unit riverine craft and the Coast Guard's Defender class 25-foot (7.6 m) boats are examples of RBBs. Some boat builders make RBB's as workboat from HDPE sheets welded together. Similar deep V-hull can be made for good seakeeping. If buoyancy chambers are filled the hull becomes truly unsinkable and extremely indestructible, making the RBB very suitable for rough conditions.

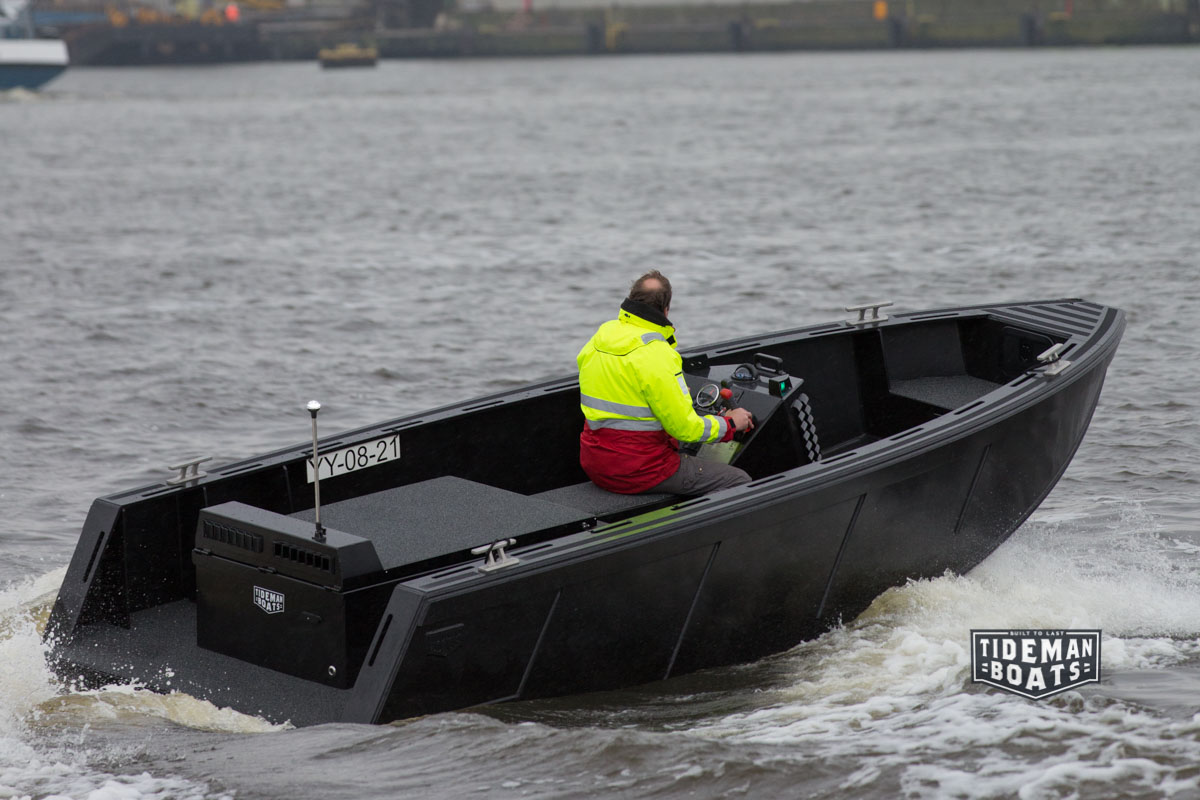
RBB made from HDPE sheets with diesel waterjet propulsion

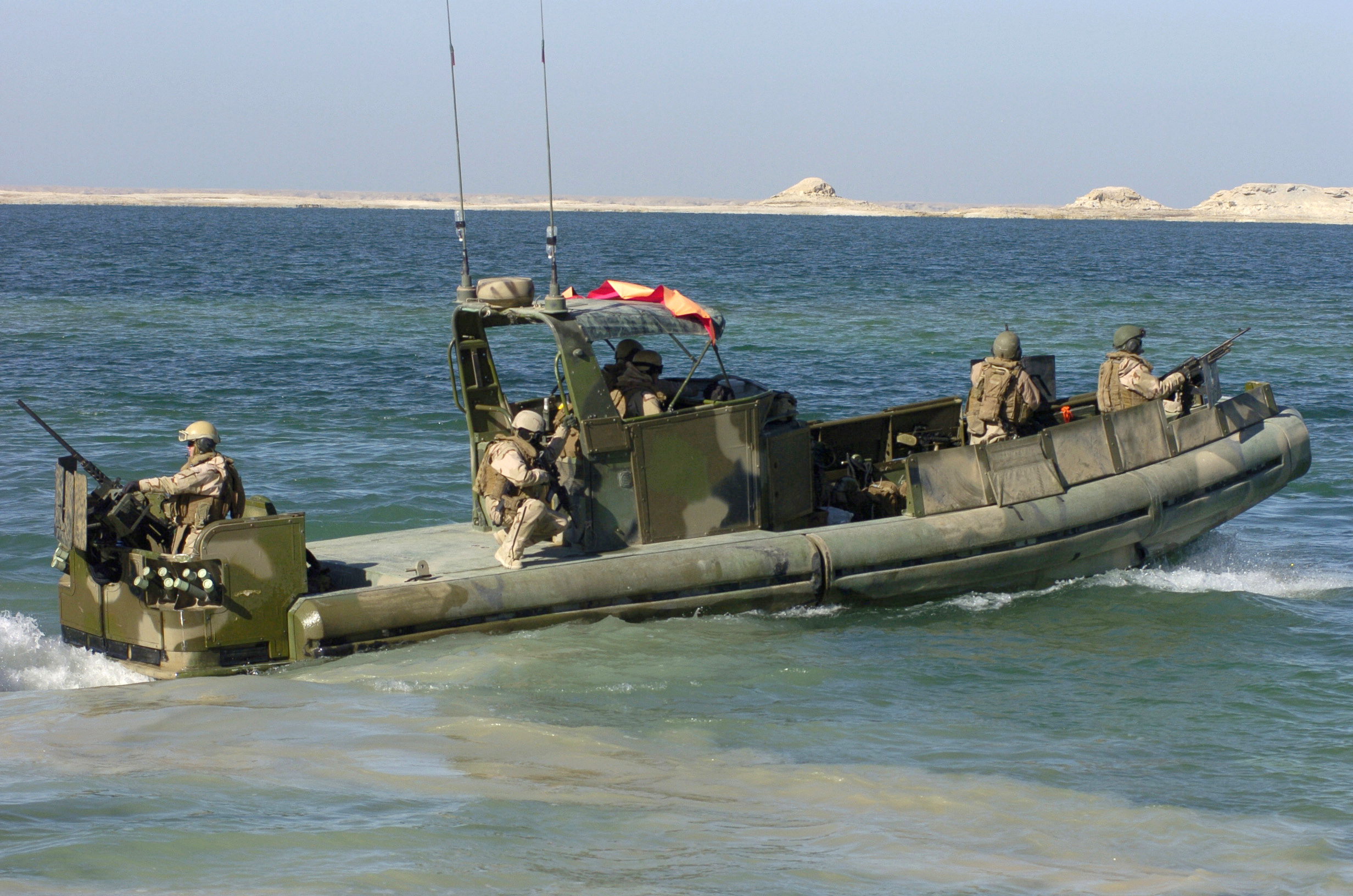
A 38 ft (12 m) Rigid Buoyant Boat (RBB), small unit riverine craft of the US Navy

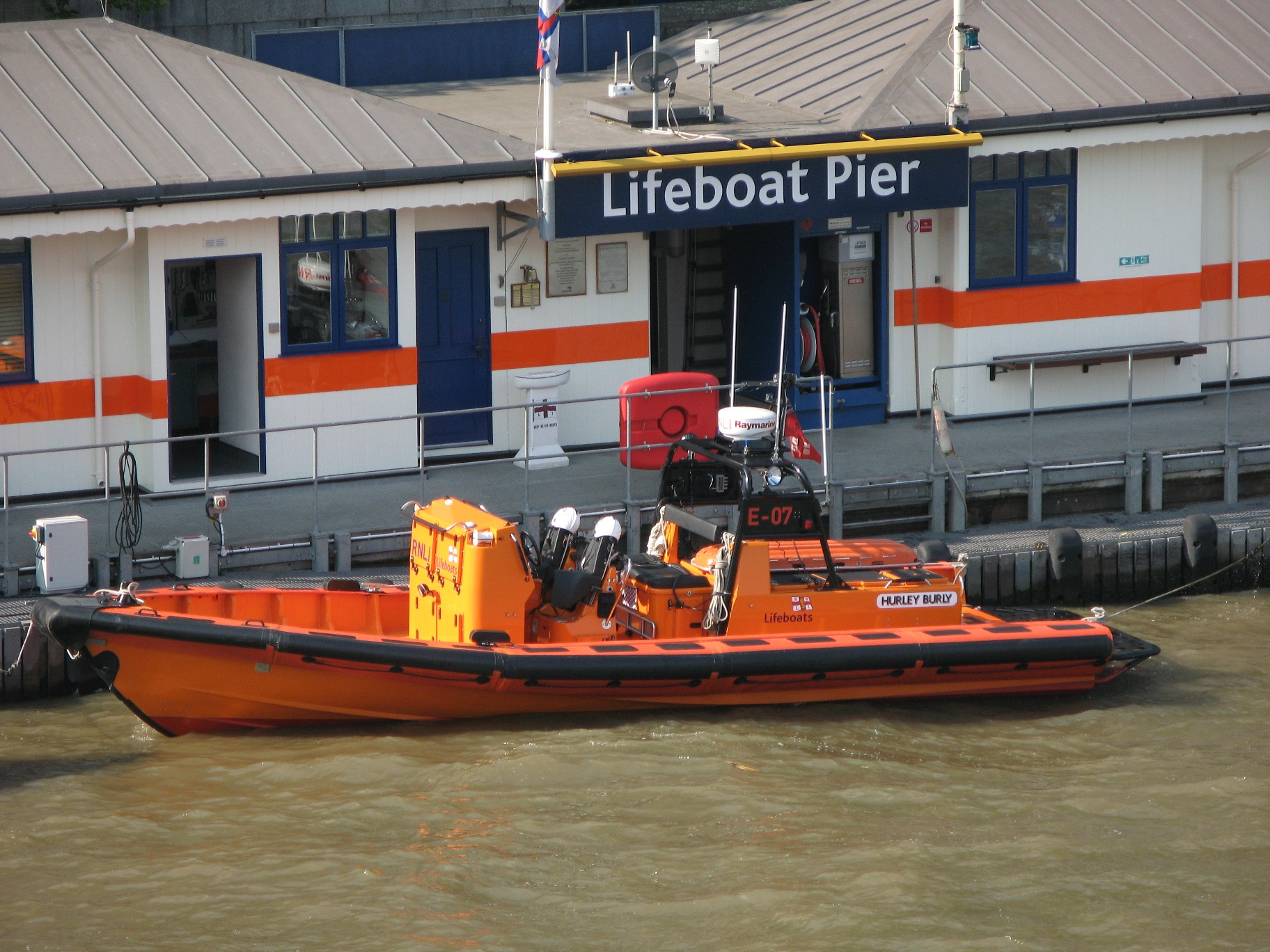
RNLI RBB at Lifeboat Pier, River Thames, London

== See also ==
- Rigid-hulled inflatable boat
