= SAFE Boats International =

American boat manufacturer

- Type: Private LLC
- Industry: Shipbuilding
- Founded: Bremerton, Washington, United States 1996
- Founder: Scott Peterson, Bill Hansen
- Headquarters: Bremerton, Washington, U.S.
- Area served: Worldwide
- Key people: Thomas Norton (CEO/CFO)
- Products: Law enforcement, Military, Fire fighting vessels
- Number of employees: 276 – 288
- Website: safeboats.com

Founded in 1997, SAFE Boats International is an American-based boat manufacturer. SAFE stands for Secure All-around Flotation Equipped. Their headquarters is near Seattle in neighboring Bremerton, Washington. SAFE Boats International manufactures vessels for military, law enforcement, fire and rescue, and other agencies. SAFE Boats also provides training program to their customers in driving and maintaining the boats. SAFE Boats International was founded in 1997 by Scott Peterson and William Hansen. Since 1997 SAFE Boats has further expanded to three factory locations in the Port of Bremerton's Olympic View Industrial Park. Their motto is "God, Country and Fast Boats." It is contracted by the General Services Administration (GSA) for procurement by U.S. Federal and Government agencies. The current CEO is Thomas Norton.

== Notable clients ==
There are over 2,000 boats currently in service by organizations in over 60 countries around the world.

In 2008, the Mexican Navy signed a US$12 million contract for six 33-foot craft, and plans to acquire 30 or more in the next two or three years. In June 2009 the Iraqi Navy acquired 26 of the 25-foot Defender class craft for US$8.4 million. They will be deployed to the Iraqi port of Umm Qasr and will secure critical infrastructure; including the Khor al Amaya (Khawr al ‘Amīyah) and al Başrah Oil Terminals in the Persian Gulf.

In 2012 Gibraltar purchased two 13 m response boats from SAFE Boats International for the Royal Gibraltar Police's role in combating the rise in drug trafficking in the Strait of Gibraltar. The RGP Commissioner, Mr. Yome was quoted as saying "These are very high-powered vessels and they give us a further capability out at sea, they also provide more protection for our officers." Media reports linked the purchases with a need to combat increased drug smuggling across the Straits of Gibraltar.

=== United States government ===
On February 5, 2011, SAFE Boats International won a U.S. government contract of $180,611,987.33 to provide 470 Response Boat-Small (RB-S) boats to U.S. Coast Guard shore units in order to perform law enforcement missions. It will also include 20 boats for Customs and Border Protection and 10 boats for the U.S. Navy, for a total of 500 boats.

In May 2012 the US Navy announced that SBI beat out two competitors to win a US$30 million contract to build five 78-foot MK VI Patrol Boats with an option for a sixth boat for another US$6million. Ultimately the US Navy plans to purchase 48 MK VI Patrol Boats. The MK VI Patrol Boats are based upon SBI's 780 Archangel-class patrol boat and the new vessels will be the Navy's next generation of patrol boats. They will have the capability to be transported and launched from large-deck LPH LHA and LHD amphibious assault ships. SAFE Boats International stated that the contract would allow them to hire 100 new employees alongside the existing 275 employees. A few months later in July 2012, SAFE Boats International was selected to build the U.S. Coast Guard's new Cutter Boat-Over the Horizon-IV (CB-OTH-IV). SAFE boats will build over 100 CB-OTH-IV vessels over a seven-year period with delivery starting in 2013. The SAFE Boats CB-OTH-IV vessel was selected over three other competitors' vessels.

== Earmarks ==
In the summer of 2010 an article was published by The Seattle Times claiming that former aides of Patty Murray, the senior United States senator from Washington, were benefiting from earmarks added to defense appropriations bills. Murray added US$57 million in earmarks to the 2011 defense appropriation bill, of which $19.5 million went to clients of her former aides who now work as lobbyists. According to the article, SAFE Boats International paid lobbying firm Denny Miller Associates US$300,000 in lobbying fees and in 2008 received $6million in an earmark sponsored by U.S. Rep Norman D. Dicks, D-Bremerton. SAFE Boats CEO Scott Peterson said that the 2011 earmark would allow for 15 or more people a year to be hired.

== Models ==
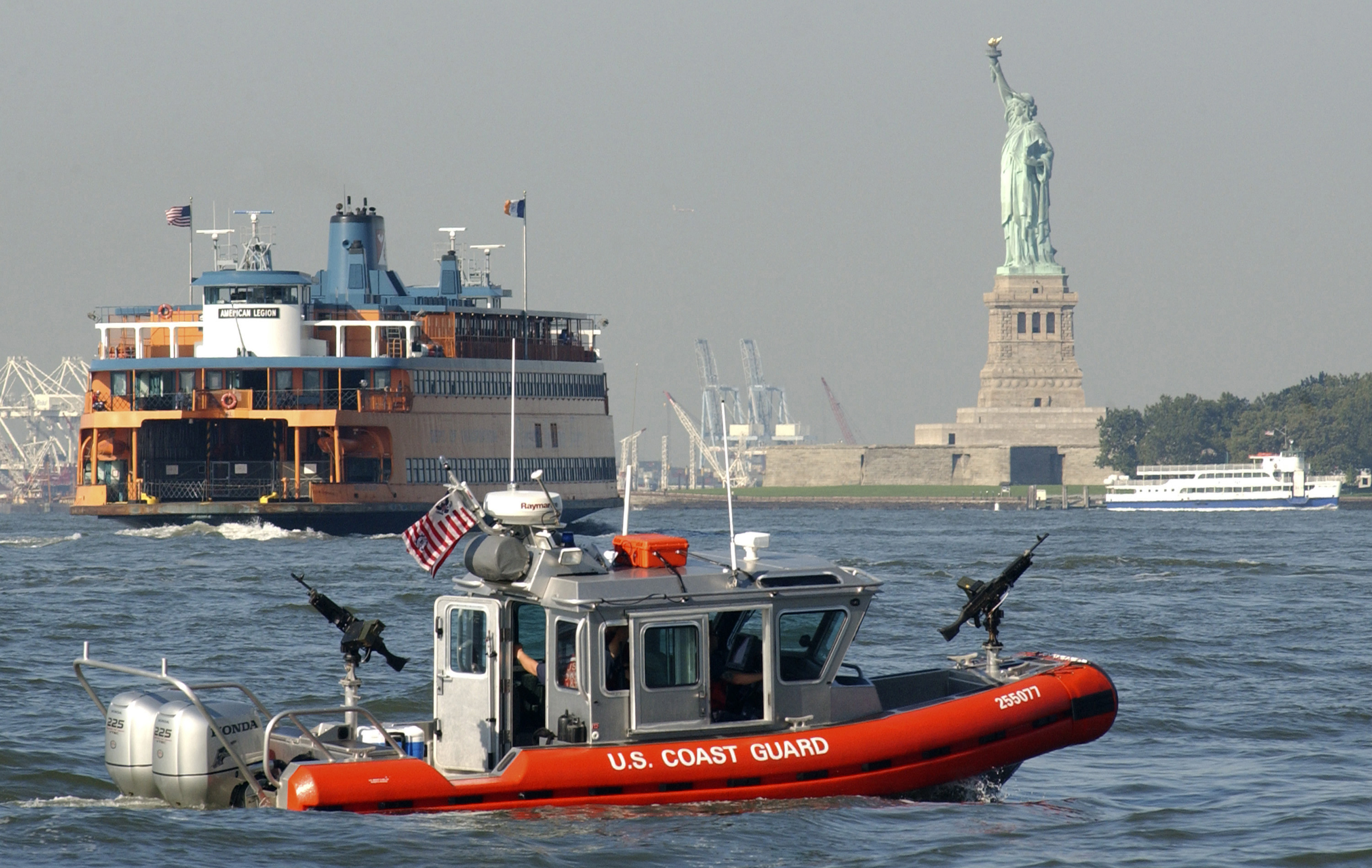
A 25-foot (8 m) Defender A-class boat from U.S. Coast Guard Maritime Safety and Security Team 91106 in New York Harbor.

- Defender class boat

Center Console The Center Console design is a 23-to-35-foot boat with open deck space geared for a variety of mission applications.

- SAFE 23 Center Console
- SAFE 25 Center Console
- SAFE 29 Center Console
- SAFE 35 Center Console

Center Console - Offshore is a 41-foot dual-stepped hull boat with a Go-fast boat design.

- SAFE 41 Center Console - Offshore

Full Cabin is a 25 to 38-foot boat with an enclosed cabin, and an outboard-driven motor. Some operators include the U.S. Coast Guard,
and U.S. Customs and Border Protection

- SAFE 25 Full Cabin
- SAFE 27 Full Cabin
- SAFE 29 Full Cabin
- SAFE 33 Full Cabin
- SAFE 38 Full Cabin

Full Cabin - Inboard is a 36 to 65 foot boat with an enclosed cabin with an Inboard diesel motor and available water jet propulsion.

- SAFE 36 Full Cabin - Inboard
- SAFE 44 Full Cabin - Inboard
- SAFE 65 Full Cabin - Inboard

- Small unit riverine craft
- Apostle
- Archangel
