= GDFS Berbice =

Patrol vessel of the Guyana Defence Force

History

Guyana
- Name: Berbice
- Namesake: Berbice River
- Builder: Metal Shark Boats
- Cost: $11.5 million
- Launched: 4 August 2023
- Commissioned: 12 November 2023
- Status: In service

General characteristics
- Class & type: Defiant-class patrol vessel
- Length: 115 ft (35 m)
- Propulsion: 2 × Caterpillar C32 diesels, 2 shafts
- Speed: 25 knots (46 km/h; 29 mph)
- Range: 2,000 nmi (3,700 km; 2,300 mi) at 12 knots (22 km/h; 14 mph)

GDFS Berbice is a 115 Defiant-class patrol vessel of the Guyana Defence Force. It was launched in 2023 shortly before the 2023 Guyana–Venezuela crisis.

== Ship history ==
Amid the renewed Guyana–Venezuela territorial dispute in the 2010s when Guyana discovered offshore oil, Venezuela increased its aggression towards its eastern neighbor. Concerns about Guyana's aging flagship, GDFS Essequibo, were raised. In May 2021, Guyana used emergency funds to make a down payment to commence the construction of the GDFS Berbice, citing the need to defend its exclusive economic zone from Venezuela.

On 4 August 2023, the Berbice was launched from the Metal Shark Boats production factory in Jeanerette, Louisiana. Months later on 30 October 2023, Metal Shark announced that the ship sailed to its shipyard in Bayou La Batre, Alabama. The Berbice was incorporated into the Guyana Defence Force in Georgetown, Guyana on 12 November 2023. Venezuelan media criticized the incorporation of the ship.

== Specifications ==
The Berbice is 115 feet (35 m) long, has a range of 2,000 nautical miles (3,700 km; 2,300 mi) at 12 knots (22 km/h; 14 mph) and can travel at a top speed of 25 knots (46 km/h; 29 mph). It has a crew of twenty-four officers and sailors. It can also serve as a mother ship for 5-meter (16 ft) rigid inflatable boats (RIBs) that can be crewed by ten individuals.
