= Vancouver City =

Vancouver City may refer to:

- Vancouver City (federal electoral district), 1904–1917, in Canada
- Vancouver City (provincial electoral district), 1890–1928, in British Columbia, Canada
- Vancouver, the largest city in British Columbia, Canada
- Vancouver, Washington, a city in the United States

== See also ==
- Vancouver (disambiguation)
