= Naval Security Team =

Military unit of the Royal Canadian Navy

- Équipe de sécurité navale
- Insignia of the Naval Security Team
- Active: 2016–present
- Country: Canada
- Branch: Royal Canadian Navy
- Type: Naval Security
- Role: Force protection
- Part of: Maritime Forces Pacific
- Garrison/HQ: CFB Esquimalt
- Equipment: Defender-class boat; SIG Sauer P225; Colt Canada C8

The Naval Security Team (NST; French: Équipe de sécurité navale; ESN) is a deployable and self-sustained Royal Canadian Navy (RCN) force protection unit established in 2016 tasked to augment the Canadian naval fleet's existing force protection assets in expeditionary or domestic environments.

Directly reporting to Maritime Forces Pacific at CFB Esquimalt, in addition to force protection the NST also provides intelligence support and opportunities for Canadian Forces Naval Reserve members to deploy overseas. Primarily composed of naval reservists, with Regular Force augmentees, the 60-person unit of selected personnel train for and deploy on individual missions and are then stood down following mission completion.

== Operational history ==
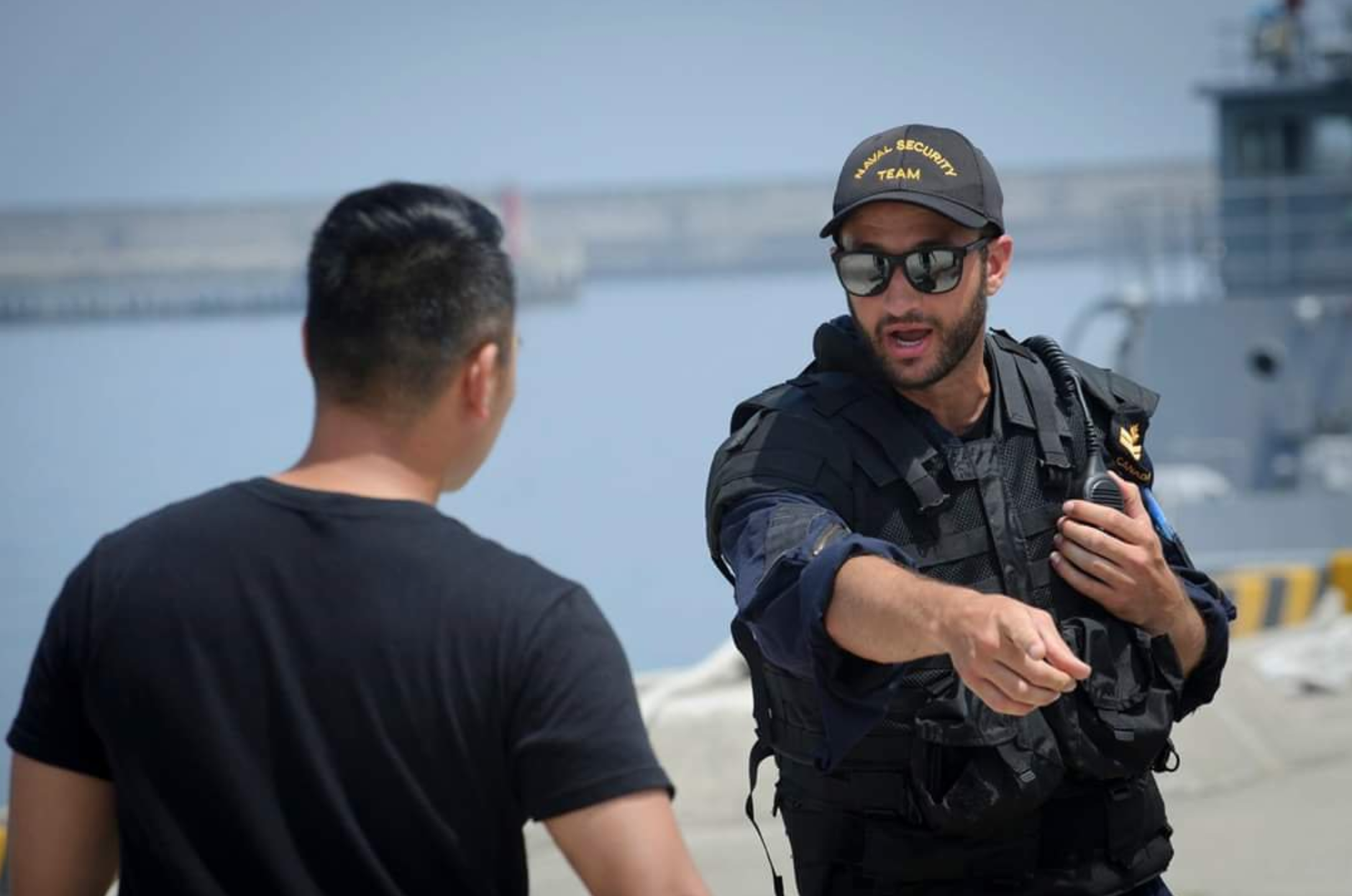
A naval reservist from HMCS Star directing another NST member during workup training prior to deploying to Busan, South Korea, in 2017

The NST first deployed in 2017, supporting the crew of HMCS Winnipeg during their port visit to Busan, South Korea. While in Busan, the NST provided on-water security for Winnipeg with two Defender-class patrol boats and shore-based sentries working alongside Republic of Korea Navy personnel.

In 2018, the NST provided enhanced force protection for HMCS Vancouver in Suva, Fiji, HMCS St. John's in Copenhagen, Denmark, and HMCS Ville de Québec in Piraeus, Greece.

In June 2019 the first group of NST personnel received new qualification badges and the unit provided support to RCN port visits to the United Arab Emirates and Italy.

From January 2024, the NST is under the command of the Advanced Naval Capabilities Unit (ANCU).

== Equipment ==
The NST operates 5 Defender-class boat equipped with two C6 machine gun. These boats are used for harbour security patrols.

NST members are armed with a SIG Sauer P225 pistol and a Colt Canada C8 carbine.
