= Small Craft Company =

Small Craft Company logo

Small Craft Company (SCCO) was a United States Marine Corps unit created in 1991 and deactivated in 2005.

== History ==
SCCO was equipped with a variety of boats designed to provide transportation and fire support to Marine infantry units.

SCCO's mission was to provide a conventional riverine capability through the conduct of waterborne mobility, security, command and control, and assault/assault support operations; and, provide personnel, maintenance, and equipment support to both MEU-SOC's BLTs assigned to LF6F, as well as to Marine Forces during UNITAS.

Some of SCCO's boats were turned over to the United States Navy Riverine Squadron before the unit's decommissioning.

SCCO participated in the Battle of Haditha.

== Vehicles ==
The following boats were used by SCCO:

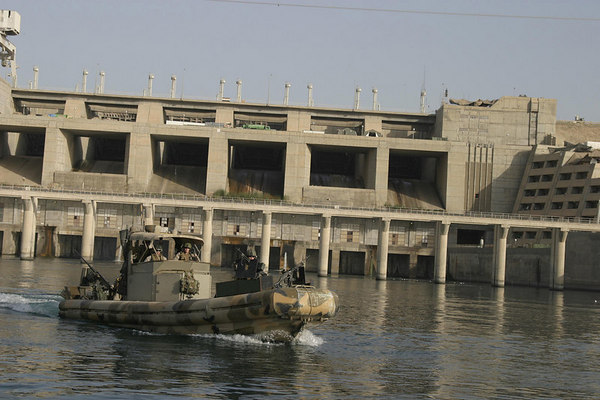
Small Unit Riverine Craft (SURC)

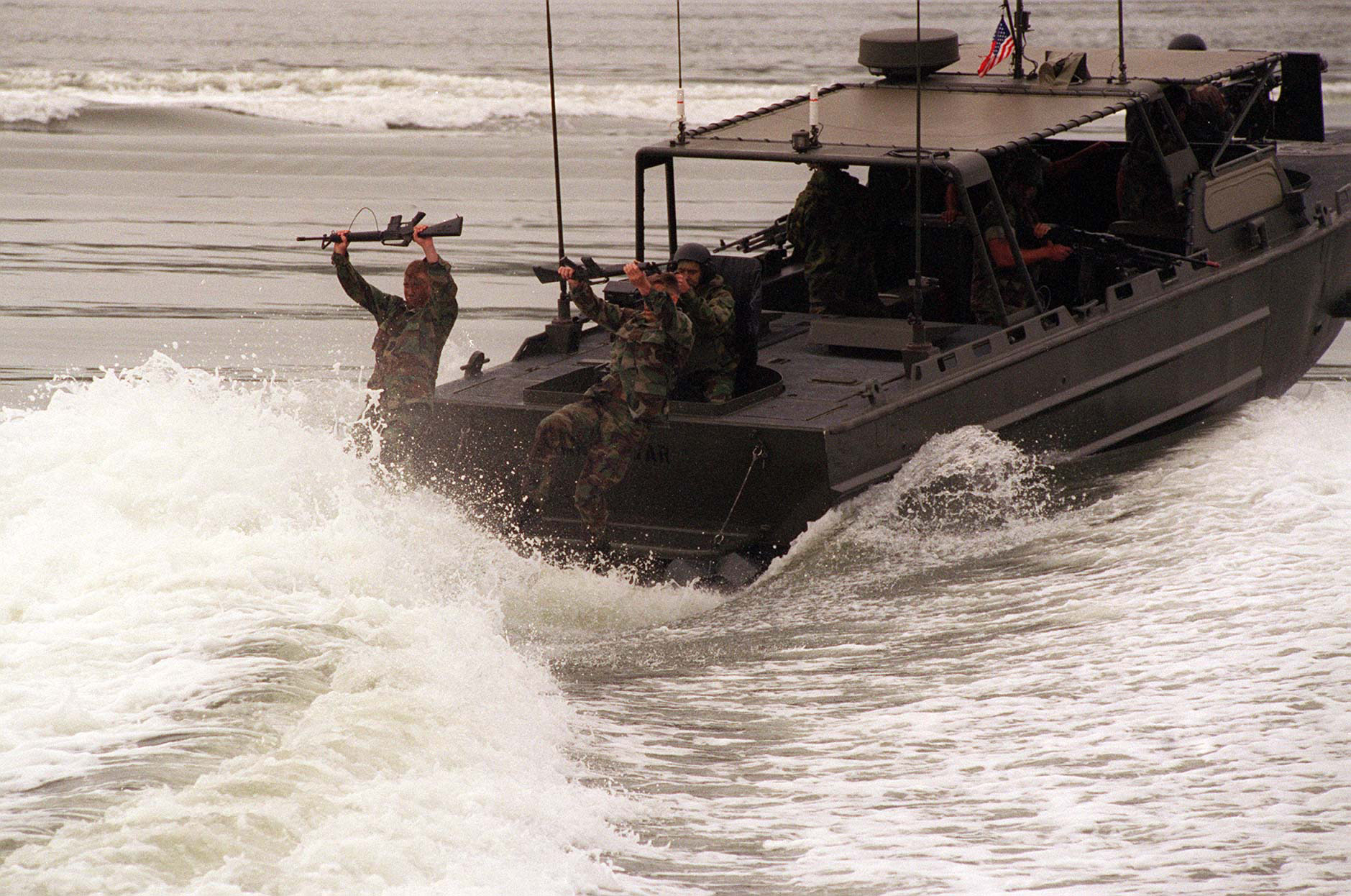
Riverine Assault Craft (RAC)

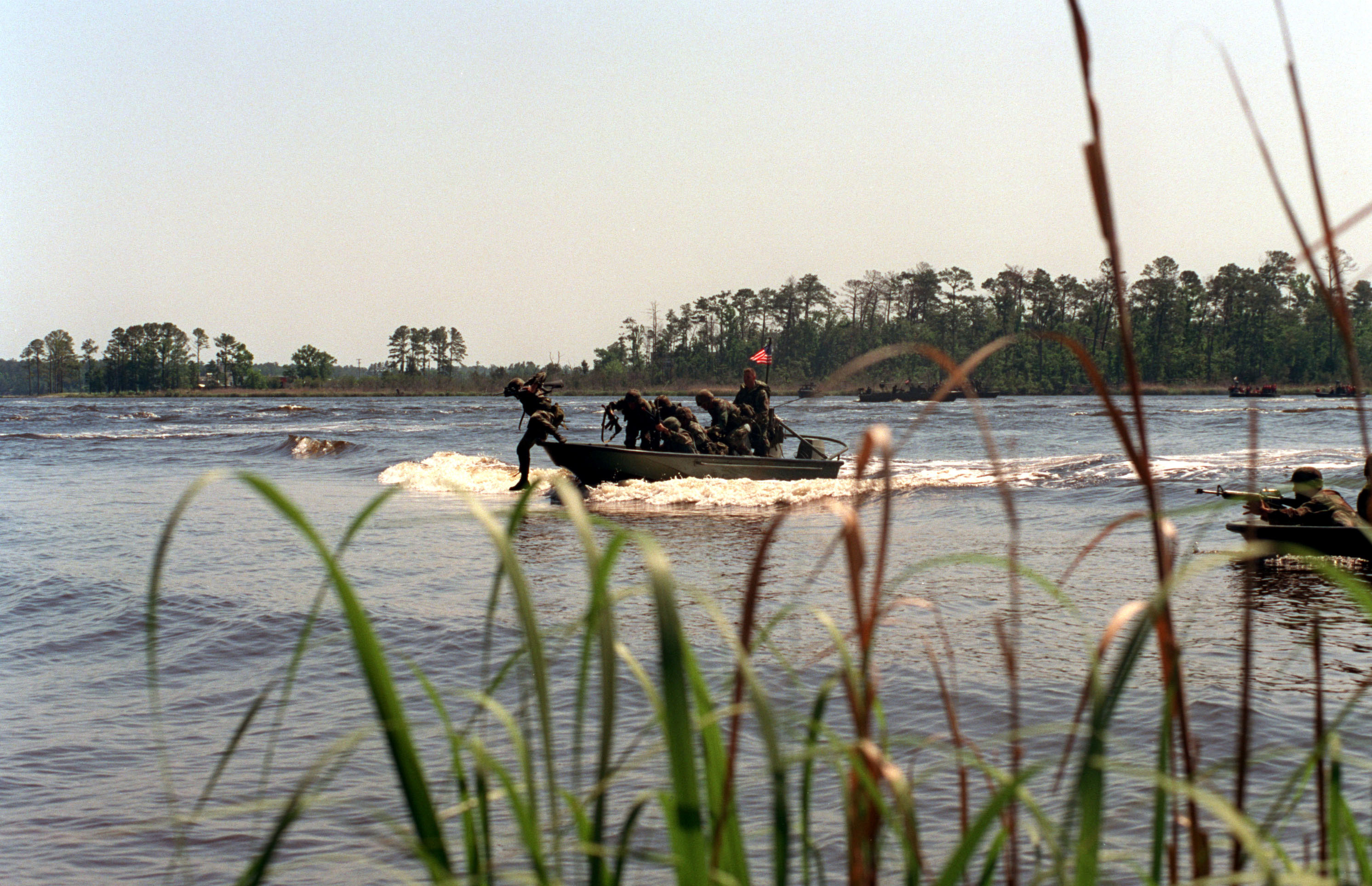
Rigid Raiding Craft (RRC)

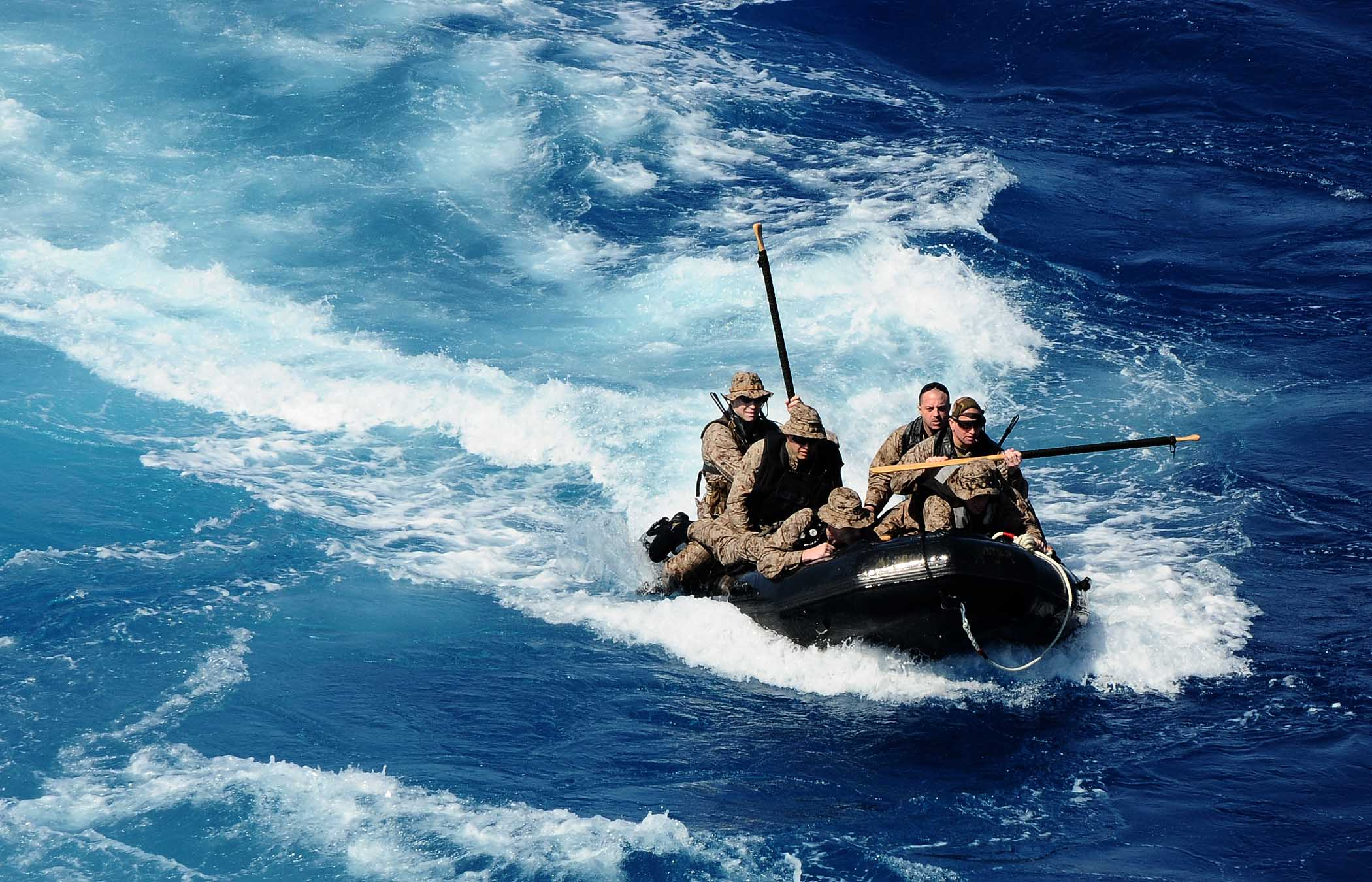
Combat Rubber Raiding Craft (CRRC)
