= Fort Vancouver (disambiguation) =

Fort Vancouver was a 19th-century fur trading post of the Hudson's Bay Company, also serving as the capital of the Columbia District, located on the Columbia River; the area later became the City of Vancouver, Washington, United States.

Fort Vancouver may also refer to:

== Places ==
- Fort Vancouver National Historic Site, Vancouver, Washington, United States
  - Fort Vancouver Barracks, Vancouver, Washington, United States; see Officers Row, Fort Vancouver Barracks
- Fort Vancouver High School, Vancouver, Washington, United States

== Other uses ==
- Fort Vancouver Centennial half dollar (1925), a United States 50-cent coin

== See also ==
- Fort Vancouver Regional Libraries, Washington State, United States
- Vancouver (disambiguation)
- Fort (disambiguation)
