= Small unit riverine craft =

Patrol boat in the US Navy

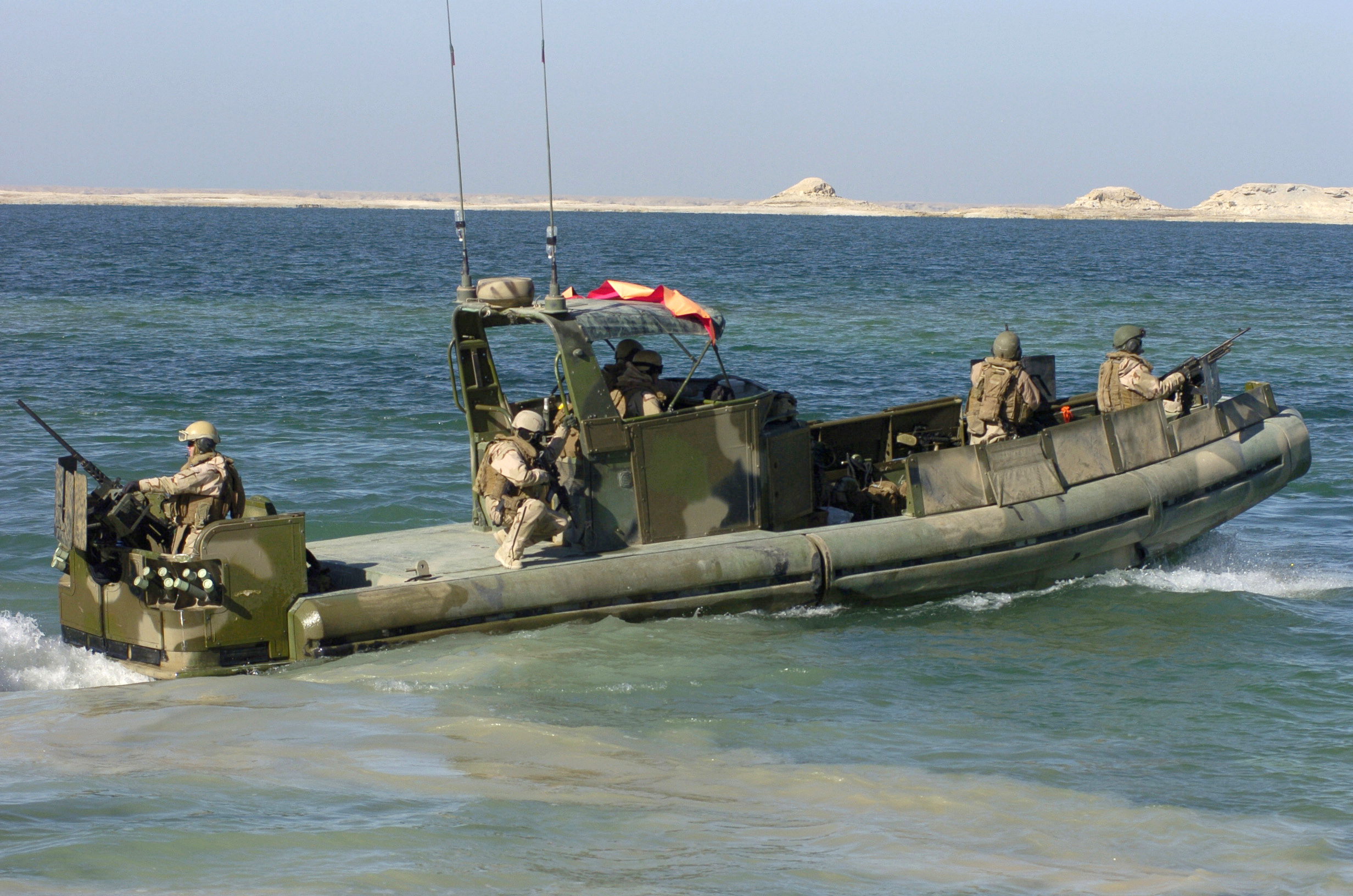
- U.S. Navy Riverine Squadron 2 patrols the waters above Haditha Dam, Anbar Province, Iraq, in a Small Unit Riverine Craft.

Class overview
- Name: Small unit riverine craft (SURC)
- Operators: United States Navy; United States Marine Corps; (Philippines) Philippine Marine Corps; (Ukraine) Ukrainian Navy

General characteristics
- Type: Riverine patrol boat
- Displacement: 22,000 lb (10,000 kg) combat load
- Length: 38 ft (12 m) (w/ transom platform)
- Beam: 10 ft 2 in (3.10 m) (collars removable for C-130 transport)
- Draft: 24 in (0.61 m) static
- Propulsion: Twin Yanmar 6LY2A-STP diesel engines, 440 bhp (330 kW) at 3300 RPM; Twin Hamilton waterjets HJ292
- Speed: 35 knots (65 km/h) cruise, 39 knots (72 km/h) sprint
- Range: >250 nm
- Complement: 16 troops
- Crew: 2
- Sensors & processing systems: Ritchie magnetic compass; Integrated AN/PSN-11 GPS (PLGR); Raymarine SL72 LCD radar; ST 60 depth sounder; Raymarine RAY53; VHF marine band radio; AN/VIC-3 internal stations; SINCGARS (VHF tactical) radio
- Armament: 3 mounts for heavy machine guns such as Browning M2HB machine guns (include rear area); Smoke launchers
- Notes: Fuel: JP-5, JP-8, and marine diesel

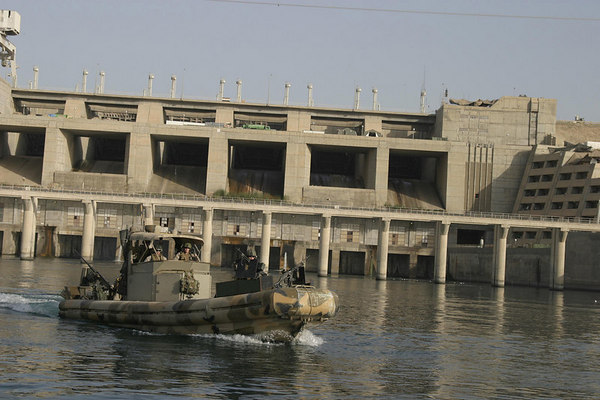
U.S. Marines with Dam Security Unit, Bravo Company, 4th Assault Amphibian Battalion near Haditha Dam in 2006.

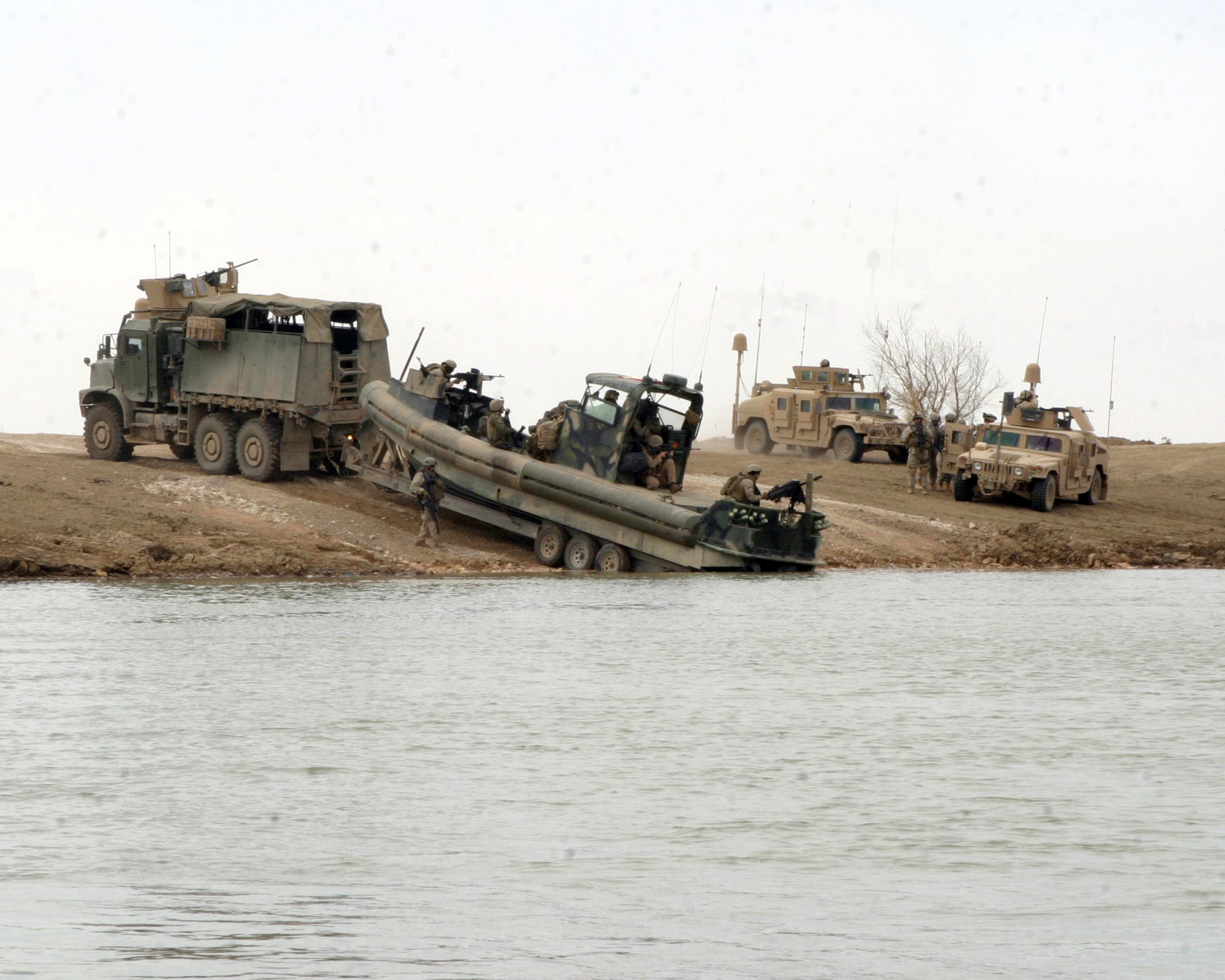
U.S. Marines launch a SURC in Iraq

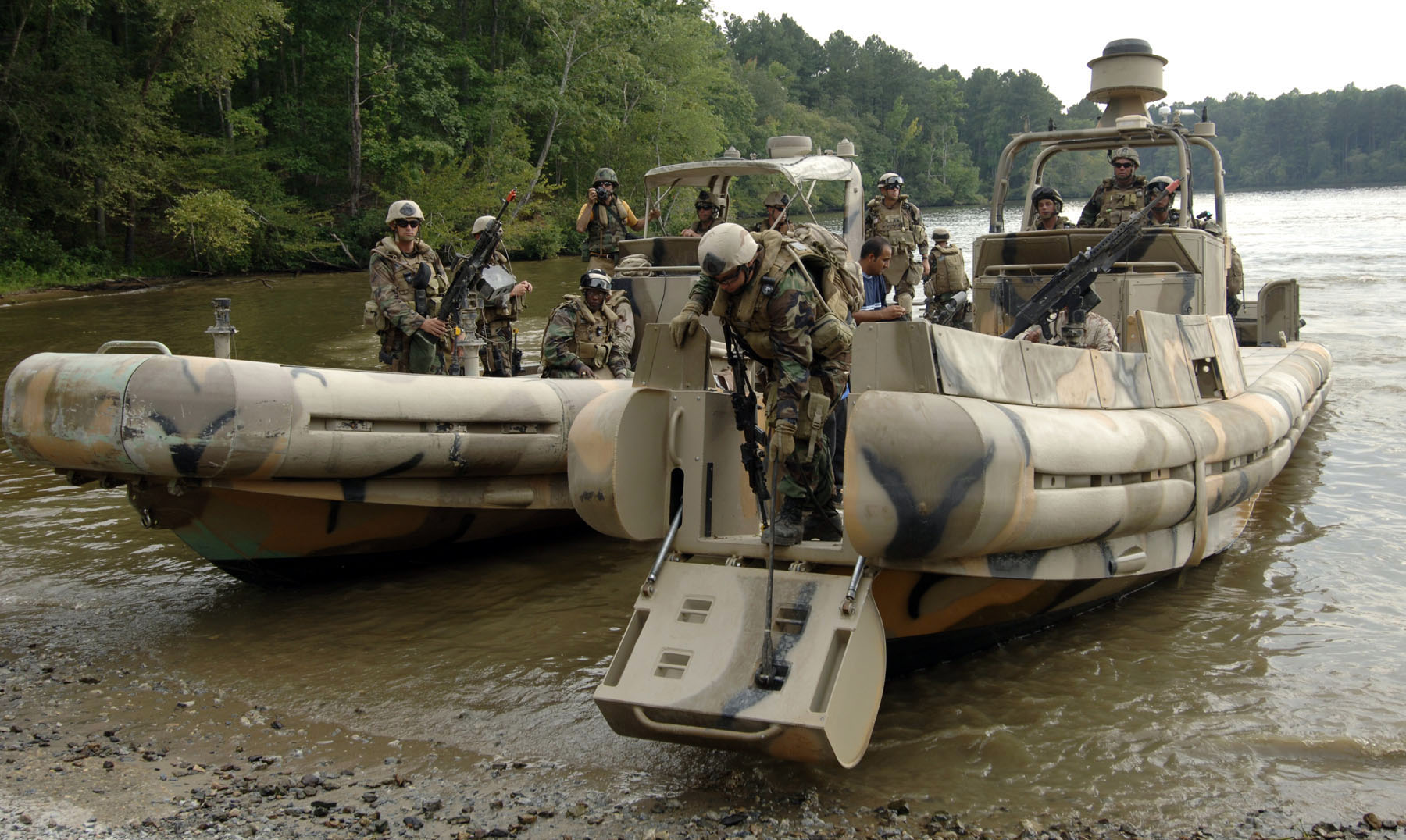
Landing ashore

The small unit riverine craft (SURC) is a rigid-hull, armed and armored patrol boat used by the U.S. Marines and U.S. Navy to maintain control of rivers and inland waterways. They are similar in size and purpose to the much older Patrol Boat, River vessels used during the Vietnam War.

The boats are built by Raytheon Naval & Maritime Integrated Systems, with a contract to build up to 100 boats. Raytheon's contract partners are SAFE Boats International of Bremerton, Washington and Boat Master of Fort Myers, Florida.

== History ==
The boats were first deployed to Iraq and were used there by the now deactivated U.S. Marine Corps' Small Craft Company, being later turned over to the United States Navy Riverine Squadrons – units of the Navy Expeditionary Combat Command (NECC) that used the boats to patrol strategic areas of Iraq.

On September 25, 2013, the United States transferred six SURCs to the Philippine Marine Corps to provide a platform for command and control, reconnaissance, logistic/resupply, medical evacuation, counter-drug operations, humanitarian assistance, peacekeeping and non-combatant evacuation operations & will be deployed to augment sea-based forces addressing terrorism and lawlessness.

== Design ==
According to the Navy, “The primary mission of the SURC is to provide tactical mobility and a limited weapons platform for the ground combat element of a Marine Air Ground Task Force in littoral and riverine environments.” The boat's secondary mission includes “command and control, reconnaissance, logistic/resupply, medevac, counter-drug operations, humanitarian assistance, peacekeeping, and noncombatant evacuation operations.”

The boat is transportable by C-130 Hercules aircraft and can be launched from its trailer at lakeside. It also has the capability to turn 180 degrees in less than three boat lengths and accelerate to 25 knots (46 km/h) in less than 15 seconds.

Occasionally, the boats would have been equipped with an overhead covering to provide shade for the troops on board.

== Other characteristics ==
Hull:	Aluminum with full length beaching plates
Collars:	High strength solid cell foam collar provides stability, redundant buoyancy, and small-arms ballistic protection
Weight:	17,500 lb (7,900 kg) craft and trailer

== See also ==
- Combat Boat 90 – known as 'Riverine Command Boat' in US Navy service.
- Fast Patrol Craft
