= Djiboutian Navy =

- Marine Nationale Djiboutienne (French); Ciidanka Badda Jabuuti (Somali)
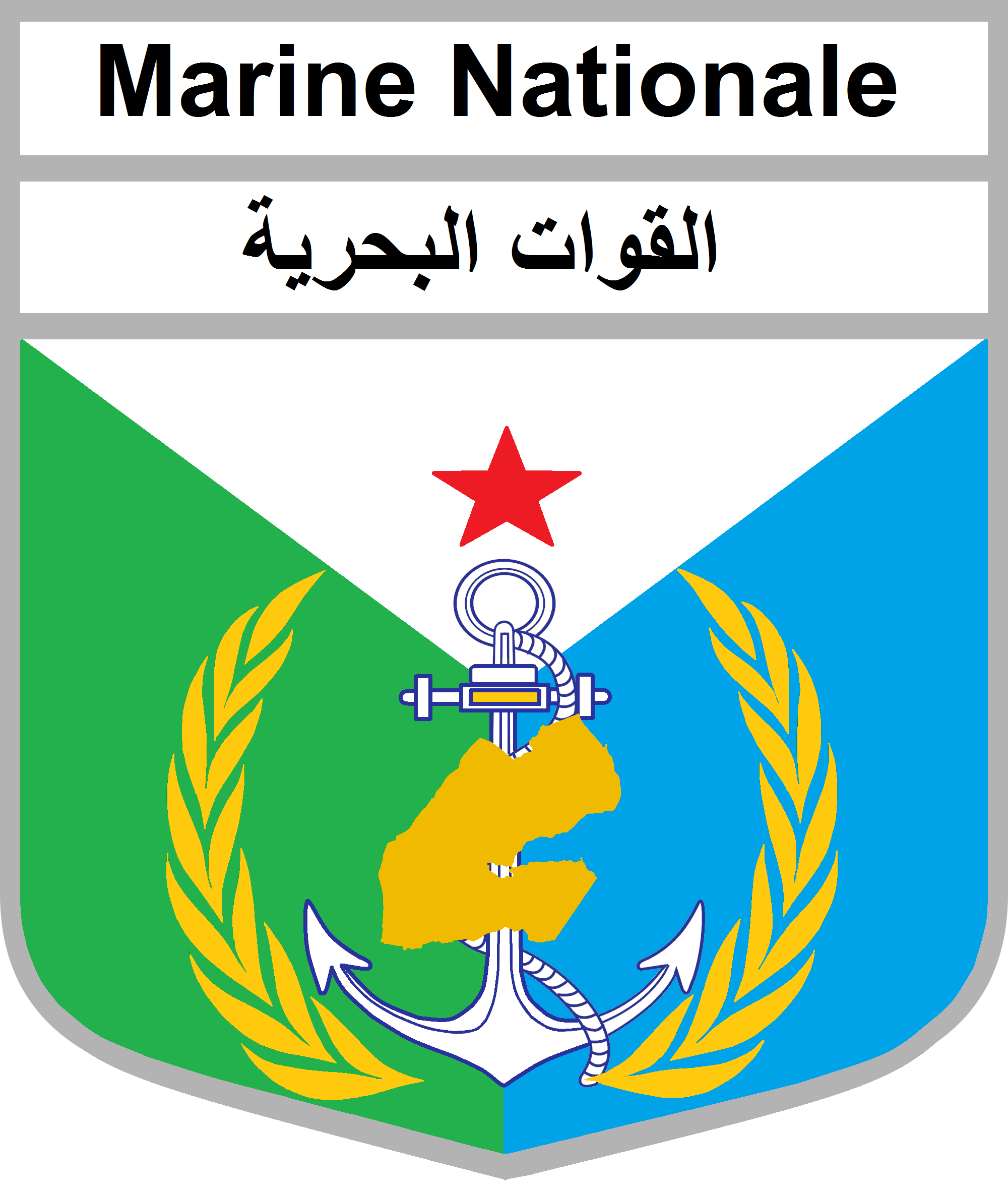
- Active: April 1979; 46 years ago
- Country: Djibouti
- Type: Navy
- Size: Navy fleets: 1,500 Active Personnel; 24 Patrol Vessels; 2 Transport; 3 Landing craft
- Part of: Djibouti Armed Forces
- Headquarters: Djibouti City
- Nickname: DN
- Engagements: Djiboutian–Eritrean border conflict

Commanders
- Chief of the Djiboutian Navy: Colonel Abdourahman Aden Cher

Insignia
- Naval Ensign

The Djiboutian Navy (French: Marine Nationale Djiboutienne, Somali: Ciidanka Badda Jabuuti) is the naval service branch of the Djibouti Armed Forces. It is responsible for securing Djibouti's territorial waters and 314-kilometre (195 mi) seaboard as well as supporting army operations. The primary objective of the navy is to safeguard the nation's maritime borders, act to deter or defeat any threats or aggression against the territory, people or maritime interests of Djibouti, both in war and peace. Through joint exercises and humanitarian missions, including disaster relief, the Djiboutian Navy promotes bilateral relations between nations. It has a fleet of gunboats, fast missile boats and support, training, which can be deployed to defend the territorial waters and coastline of Djibouti as well as protect tankers passing through the Bab-el-Mandeb strait.

The navy was built and structured with assistance from the United States since the end of the Cold War, but has also relied on other sources for equipment in some areas. Djiboutian forces are an important player in the Bab-el-Mandeb and Gulf of Aden.

== History ==
The Navy was founded in 1979 and began a significant expansion with France assistance in 1981. Initially it comprised the remnants of the Gendarmerie and focused on port safety and security and traffic monitoring. It is responsible for securing Djibouti's territorial waters and 314-kilometre (195 mi) seaboard. An area with considerable fish stocks, there is an active fisheries industry.

The acquisition of the several boats from the US in 2006 considerably increased the navy's ability to patrol over longer distances and to remain at sea for several days at a time. Cooperation with the US and Yemeni navies is also increasing in an effort to protect and maintain the safety and security of the Sea Lanes of Communication (SLOC). The Navy continues upgrading.

== Bases ==
The main bases of the Djiboutian Navy are located in:

- Djibouti City
- Obock
- Tadjoura
- Khôr ʽAngar
- Maskali Island

== Mission ==
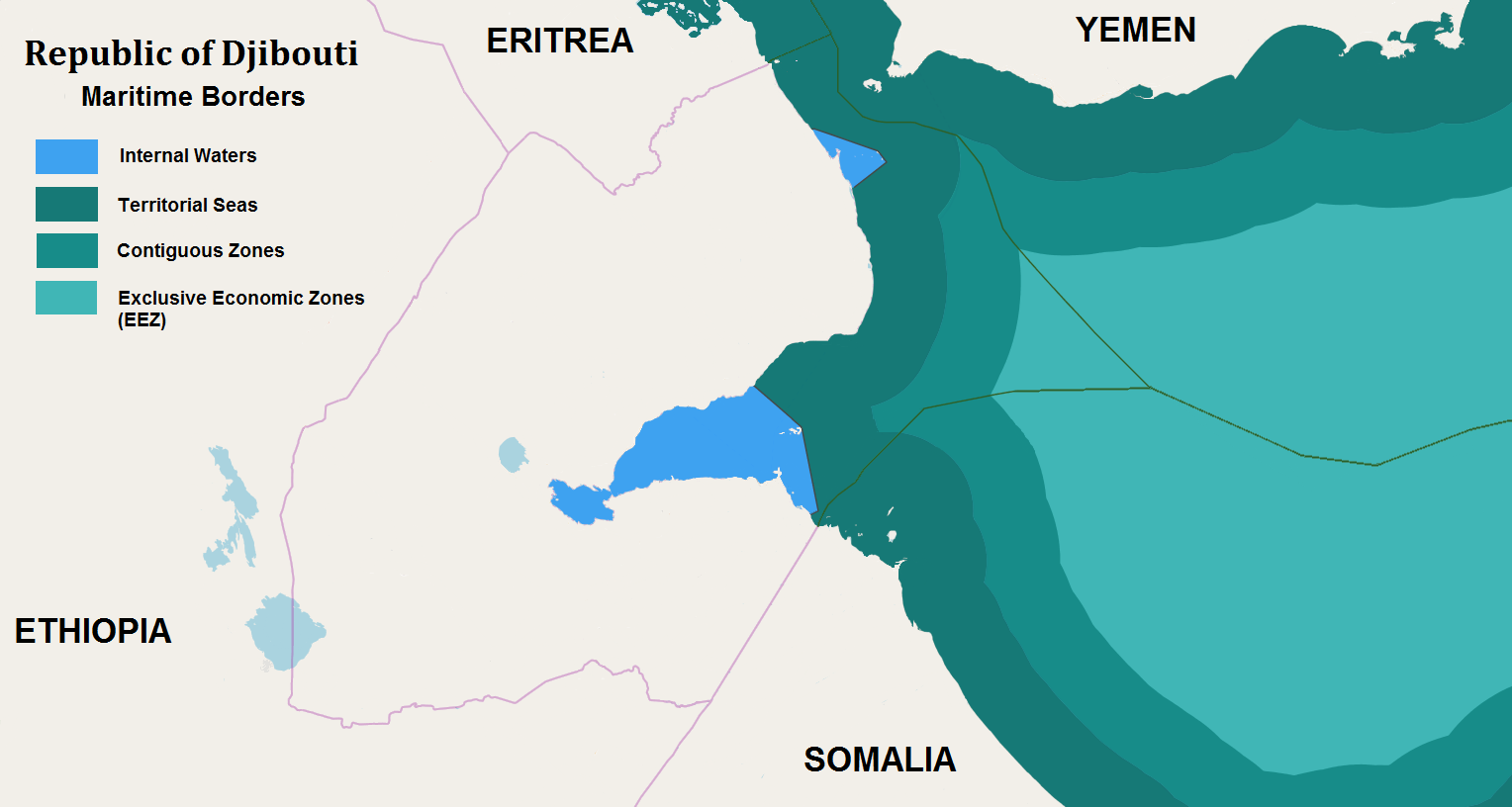
Djibouti's territorial waters.

The Djiboutian Navy is part of the Djibouti Armed Forces. Its mission includes the protection of Djiboutian territory and sovereignty, as well as the controlling the exclusive economic zone.

Other tasks include the maintenance, preservation and the provision of naval services in support of other state departments and authorities, including search and rescue, protection of maritime resources, and diplomatic sea transport support.

== Naval Equipment ==
Class	Type	Origin	Quantity	Notes
Patrol Vessel
Metal Shark 28 Defiant	Patrol Vessel	United States	6	
Defender-class boat	Patrol Vessel	United States	4	
44-foot motor lifeboat	Patrol Vessel	United States	4	
35-tonne Swari-class	Patrol Vessel	United States	6	
27-meter Predator Class Patrol Boat	Patrol Vessel	China	4	
Transport
Damen FCS 5009	Transport	South Africa	2	
Landing craft
EDIC landing craft	Landing craft	France	2	
LSM 66m landing craft	Landing craft	South Africa	1	
