= North Vancouver =

North Vancouver or Vancouver North may refer to:

- North Vancouver (city), a city in British Columbia, Canada
- North Vancouver (district municipality), a district municipality in British Columbia, Canada
- North Vancouver (federal electoral district), a federal electoral district in British Columbia, Canada
- North Vancouver (provincial electoral district), a provincial electoral district in British Columbia, Canada
- School District 44 North Vancouver, a school board covering North Vancouver in British Columbia, Canada
- Vancouver North, a former federal election district in Vancouver, British Columbia, Canada

== See also ==
- North Shore (Greater Vancouver), which encompasses the city and the district as well as West Vancouver
- North Vancouver School District
- Vancouver (disambiguation)
- Vancouver (electoral districts)
