= Vancouver (disambiguation) =

Vancouver is the most populous city in British Columbia, Canada.

Vancouver may also refer to:

== Places ==
- Mount Vancouver, a mountain on the Yukon–Alaska border
- Mount Vancouver (New Zealand), a mountain in the Southern Alps on the South Island of New Zealand

=== Canada ===
- Greater Vancouver, a metropolitan area whose urban centre is Vancouver, British Columbia
- Metro Vancouver Regional District, a British Columbia regional district that encompasses Vancouver and surrounding municipalities
- Vancouver (electoral districts), electoral districts in Vancouver, British Columbia
- Vancouver Island, a major landmass off the western coast of British Columbia
- Vancouver River, a river emptying into Prince of Wales Reach of Jervis Inlet

=== United States ===
- Vancouver, Washington
  - Fort Vancouver, a 19th-century fur trading post in present-day Vancouver
  - Vancouver Barracks, a former U.S. Army station near Fort Vancouver
- Vancouver Lake, a lake in Clark County, Washington

== People with the surname ==
- George Vancouver (1757–1798), British naval officer and explorer

== Vessels ==
- Vancouver (1826 vessel), a vessel operated by the Hudson's Bay Company from 1826 to 1834
- Vancouver (steamboat), a cargo steamer owned and operated by the Hudson's Bay Company from 1838 to 1848
- Vancouver (1852 vessel), a vessel operated by the Hudson's Bay Company from 1852 to 1853
- HMCS Vancouver, a Canadian navy ship name, and list of ships by that name
  - HMCS Vancouver (F6A), a Royal Canadian Navy S-class destroyer
  - HMCS Vancouver (FFH 331), a Canadian Forces Halifax-class frigate
- HMS Vancouver, original name of HMS Vimy, a V-class destroyer of the British Royal Navy
- USS Vancouver, a US Navy Raleigh-class amphibious transport dock

== Music ==
- Vancouver (album), 2009, by Matthew Good
- Vancouver (EP), 2006, by La Dispute
- Bobby Taylor & the Vancouvers, a 1960s-vintage Motown band

== Schools ==
- Vancouver College (disambiguation)
- Vancouver University (disambiguation)
- Vancouver School Board, Vancouver, British Columbia, Canada
- Vancouver Public Schools, Vancouver, Washington, United States

== Other uses ==
- Canadian Vickers Vancouver, an interwar coastal patrol flying boat
- Vancouver Expedition, a 1791 voyage commanded by George Vancouver
- Vancouver FC, a professional soccer club based in Langley, British Columbia
- Vancouver system, a citation style
- Vancouver Special, an architectural style
- Vancouverism, an urban planning and architectural phenomenon

== See also ==
- Fort Vancouver (disambiguation)
- Vancouver Metro (disambiguation), including Metro Vancouver
- Vancouver East (disambiguation), including East Vancouver
- North Vancouver (disambiguation), including Vancouver North
- South Vancouver (disambiguation), including Vancouver South
- West Vancouver, a city in Metro Vancouver, British Columbia, Canada
- Vancouver Bay, British Columbia, Canada; a locality and former cannery town on Jervis Inlet
- Vancouver School, style of photography and group of photographers
