= Vancouver Metro =

Vancouver Metro or Metro Vancouver can refer to:

- Metro Vancouver Regional District, British Columbia, Canada
- Port Metro Vancouver seaport
- Vancouver Metro Soccer League, British Columbia, Canada

== See also ==
- Metro Vancouver Electoral Area A, British Columbia, Canada
- Vancouver (disambiguation)
- Metro (disambiguation)
