= Metal Shark Boats =

American shipbuilding company

Metal Shark Boats is an American developer and builder of aluminum-hull vessels that operates shipyards in Jeanerette and Franklin, Louisiana. It offers a variety of vessels ranging from commercial transportation to specialized law enforcement and military applications.

== History ==
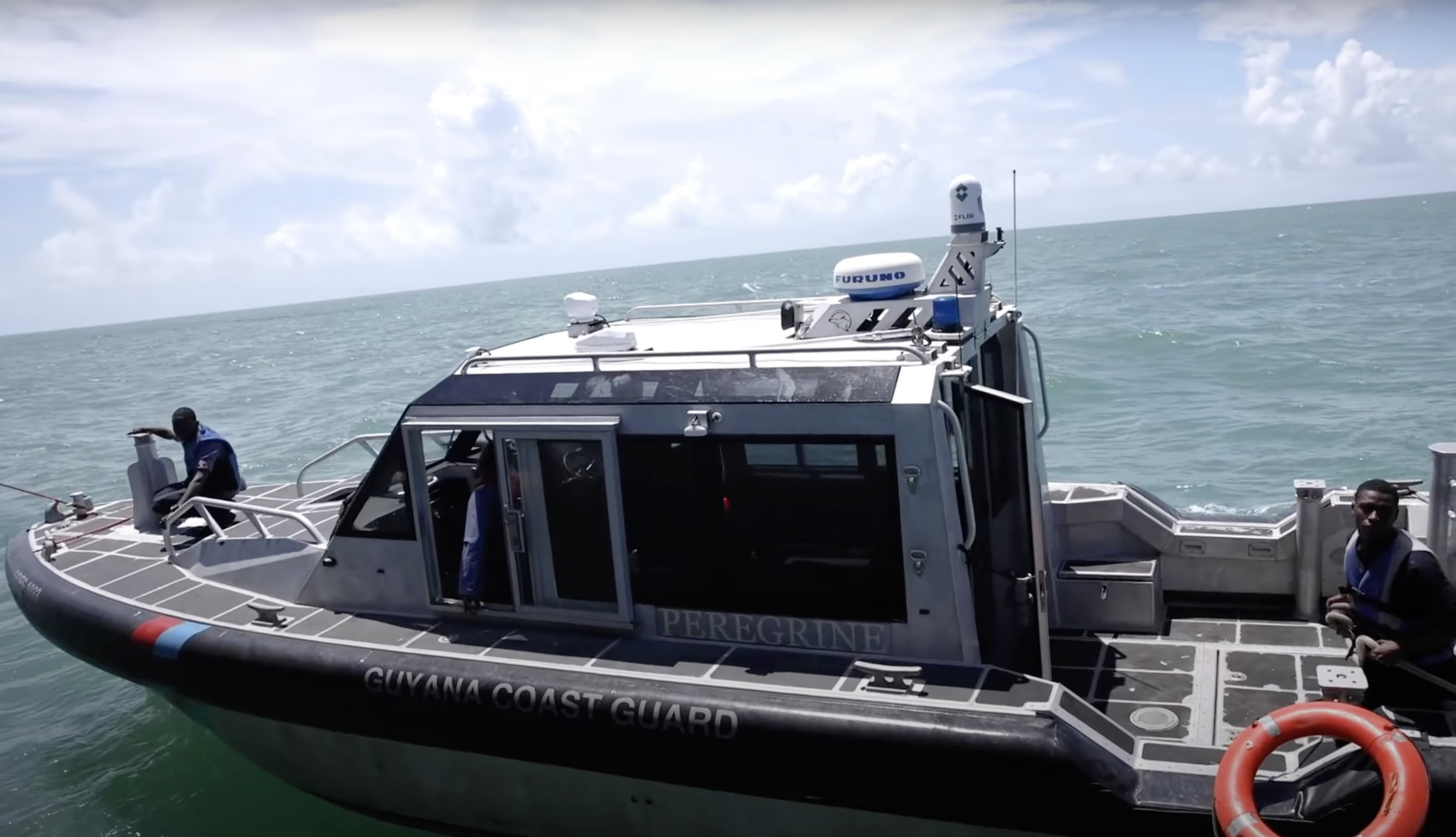
The Peregrine, by Metal Shark Boats

The company was founded as Gravois Aluminum Boats in 1986, building primarily small recreational vessels. As sales declined Gravois incorporated Metal Shark in 2005 with the goal of attracting governmental and commercial clients. The company operated out of its Jeanerette facility, building boats up to 60 feet (18 m) in length primarily for government agencies, notably a $192 million contract for almost 500 small response boats for the United States Coast Guard.

In January 2014, Metal Shark announced that it had purchased a 25 acres (0.10 km^{2}) site in Franklin, Louisiana on the Charenton Bypass Canal and planned to establish a second shipyard there with the capacity to construct vessels up to 250 feet (76 m) in length. The facility opened in July 2014. In December 2014, Metal Shark reached an agreement with the Damen Group to market and build Damen-designed ships. As of 2016, Metal Shark had built about a thousand vessels for operators around the world.

Metal Shark won the $54 million contract to build 13 Defiant-class patrol vessels, under the supervision of the US Navy, intended to be given the USA's Caribbean neighbours. The class of vessels is based on the Damen Stan 2606 design—the same design nearby rival Bollinger shipyards used for the US Coast Guard's very successful Marine Protector class of cutters.

Metal Shark manufactures a smaller class of 38 feet (12 m) patrol vessels, also called the Defiant class. Metal Shark delivered the first of several Defiant class vessels to Senegal and Cabo Verde in February 2018. Those vessels were gifts from the USA.

== Operators ==
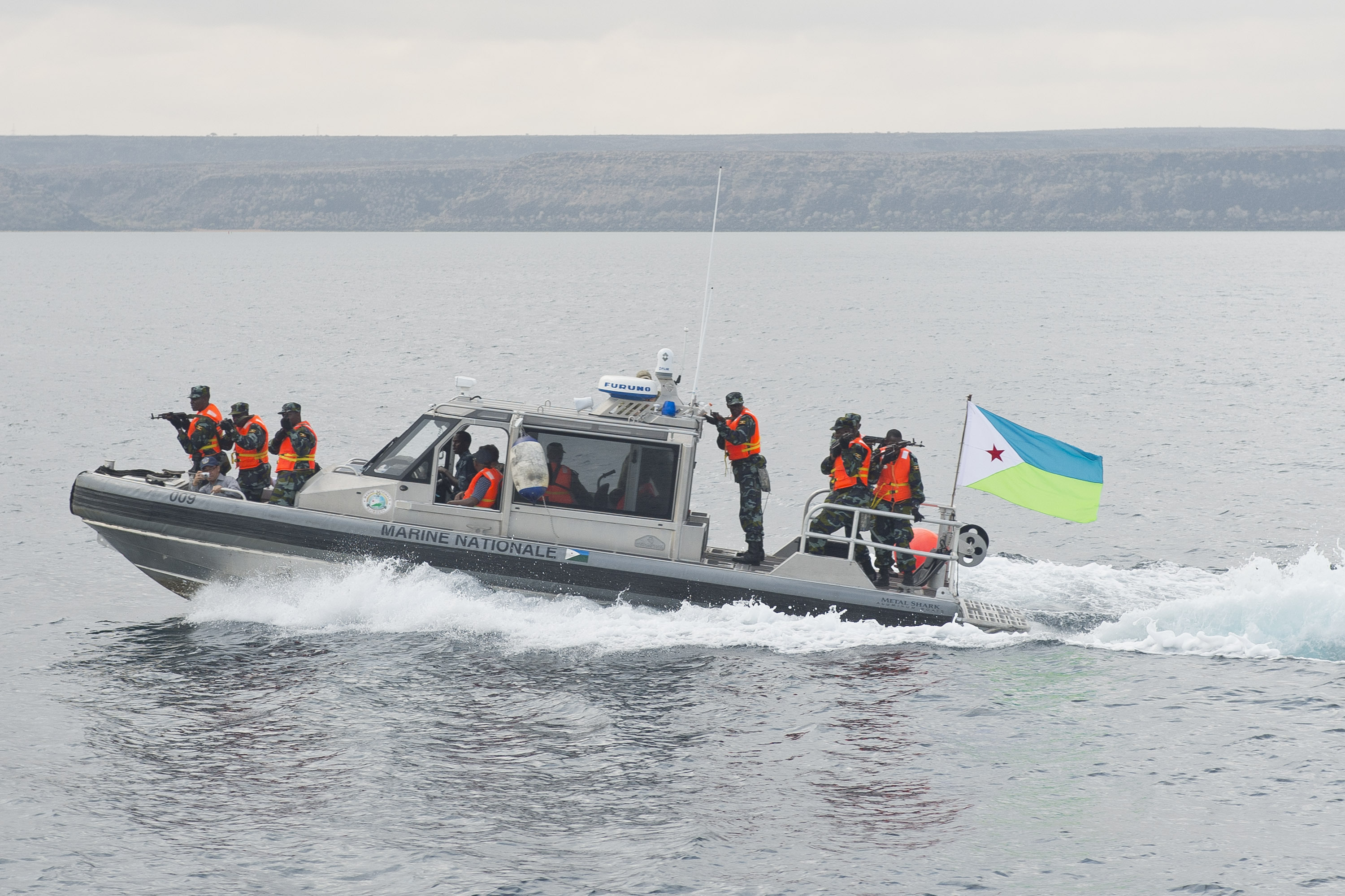
Defiant class patrol boat of Djibouti

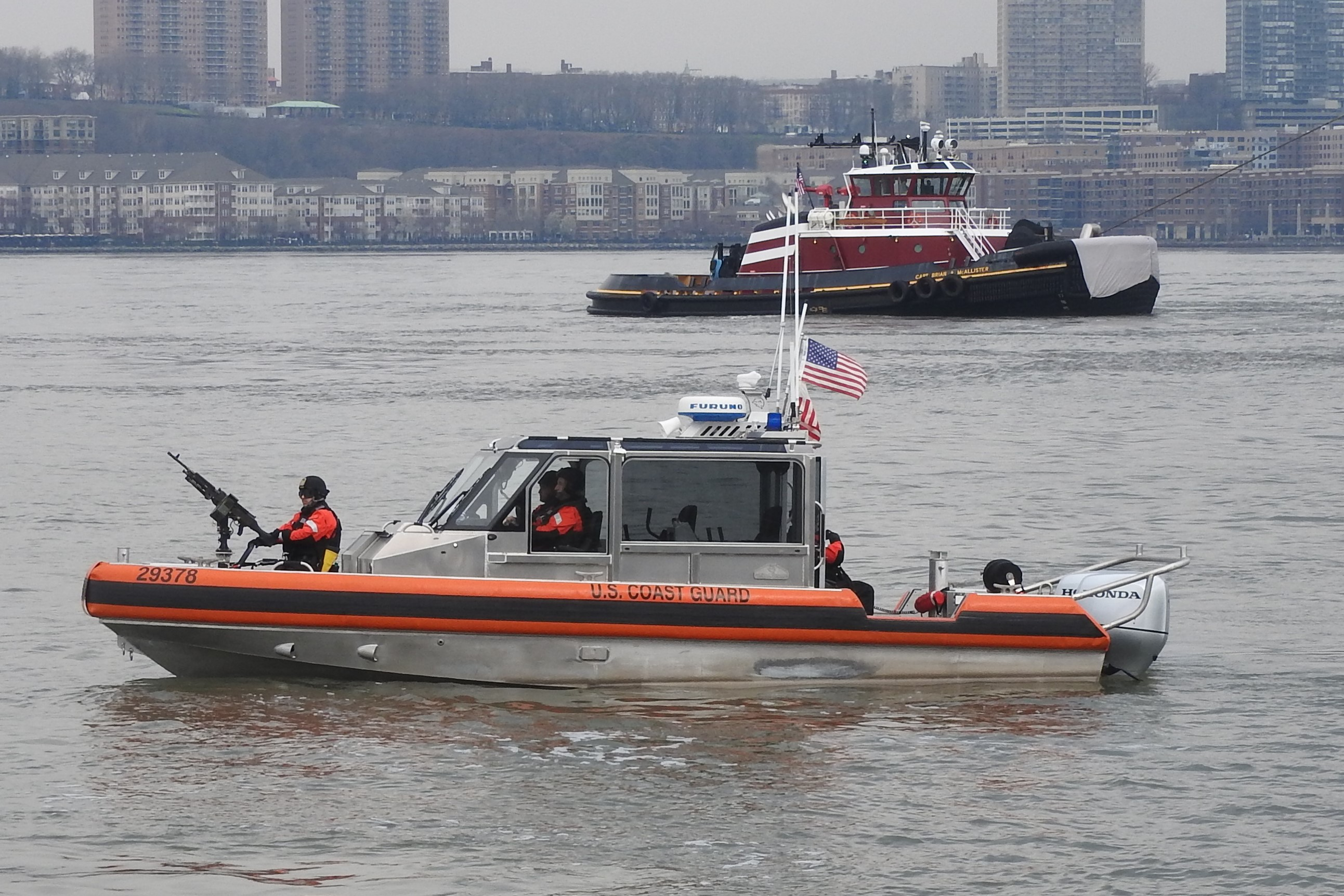
Response boat - Small II

Operators of Metal Shark Boats:

- Bangladesh
  - Bangladesh Navy
  - Bangladesh Coast Guard
  - Bangladesh Army
- Cape Verde
  - Cape Verdean Armed Forces
- Djibouti
  - Djiboutian Navy
- Guyana
  - Guyana Coast Guard
- Netherlands
  - Dutch Caribbean Coast Guard - 12x Defiant 38 in service
- Senegal
  - Senegal Navy
- Ukraine
  - Military Naval Forces of the Armed Forces of Ukraine
  - Ukrainian Sea Guard
- United States
  - United States Coast Guard
- Vietnam
  - Vietnam Coast Guard

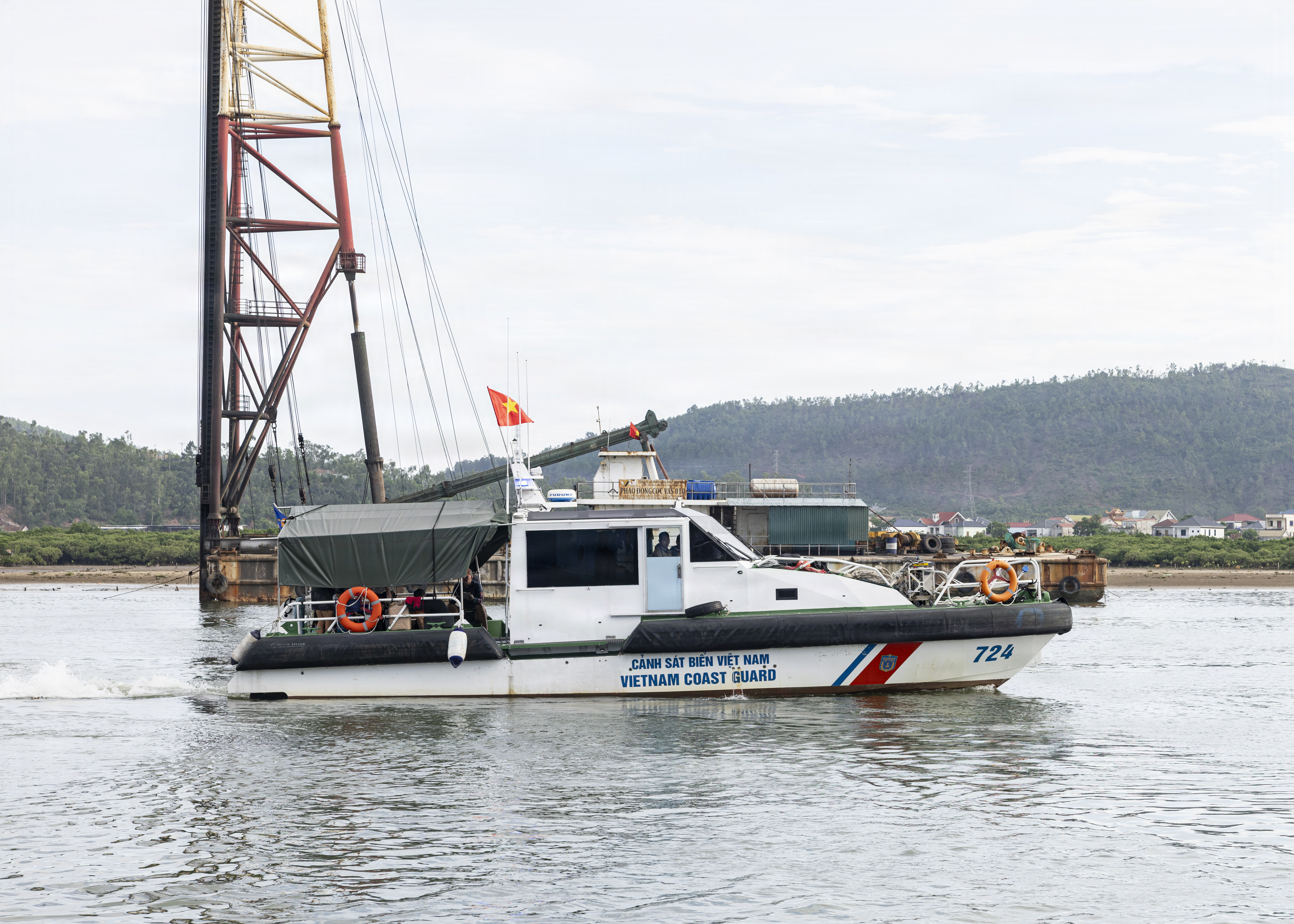
A 45-foot Defiant boat in Vietnam Coast Guard colors.

== See also ==
- GDFS Berbice
- Defiant-class patrol vessel
