= Vancouver University =

Vancouver University or University of Vancouver can refer to:

In British Columbia, Canada:

- In Vancouver:
  - Simon Fraser University
  - University of British Columbia
    - University of British Columbia Vancouver, the main campus
  - University Canada West
- On Vancouver Island:
  - Vancouver Island University

In Vancouver, Washington, United States:

- Washington State University Vancouver

== See also ==
- All pages with titles containing "Vancouver" and "University"
- Vancouver, British Columbia § Education – in Canada
- Vancouver, Washington § Education – in the United States
- Vancouver College (disambiguation)
- Vancouver (disambiguation)
