= South Vancouver (disambiguation) =

South Vancouver or Vancouver South may refer to:

- South Vancouver, British Columbia, a former municipality that was merged into Vancouver, British Columbia, Canada
- Vancouver South (federal electoral district), a defunct federal electoral district in British Columbia, Canada
- Vancouver South (provincial electoral district), a defunct provincial electoral district in British Columbia, Canada
- South Vancouver (electoral district), a defunct provincial electoral district in British Columbia, Canada
- South Vancouver High School, Vancouver, British Columbia, Canada

== See also ==
- Vancouver-South Granville, a provincial electoral district in British Columbia, Canada
- Vancouver South—Burnaby, a federal electoral district in British Columbia, Canada
- Mount Vancouver South Peak, Mount Vancouver, Alaska, United States
- Vancouver (disambiguation)
- South (disambiguation)
