= Vancouver East (disambiguation) =

East Vancouver or Vancouver East may refer to:

- East Vancouver, a neighbourhood of Vancouver, British Columbia, Canada
- Vancouver East (federal electoral district), a federal electoral district in British Columbia, Canada
- Vancouver East (provincial electoral district), a provincial electoral district in British Columbia, Canada
- Vancouver East School, Vancouver, British Columbia, Canada

== See also ==
- Vancouver (disambiguation)
- East (disambiguation)
