= Vancouver College (disambiguation) =

Vancouver College or College of Vancouver may refer to:

- Vancouver College, Shaugnessy, Vancouver, British Columbia, Canada
- Vancouver Career College, Vancouver, British Columbia, Canada
- Vancouver Community College, British Columbia, Canada

== See also ==
- All pages with titles containing "Vancouver" and "College"
- Vancouver, British Columbia § Education – in Canada
- Vancouver, Washington § Education – in U.S.A.
- List of colleges and universities in Washington (state)
- List of colleges in British Columbia
- Vancouver University (disambiguation)
- Vancouver (disambiguation)
