= Defiant-class patrol vessel =

US-made patrol boats supplied to Caribbean and Central American nations

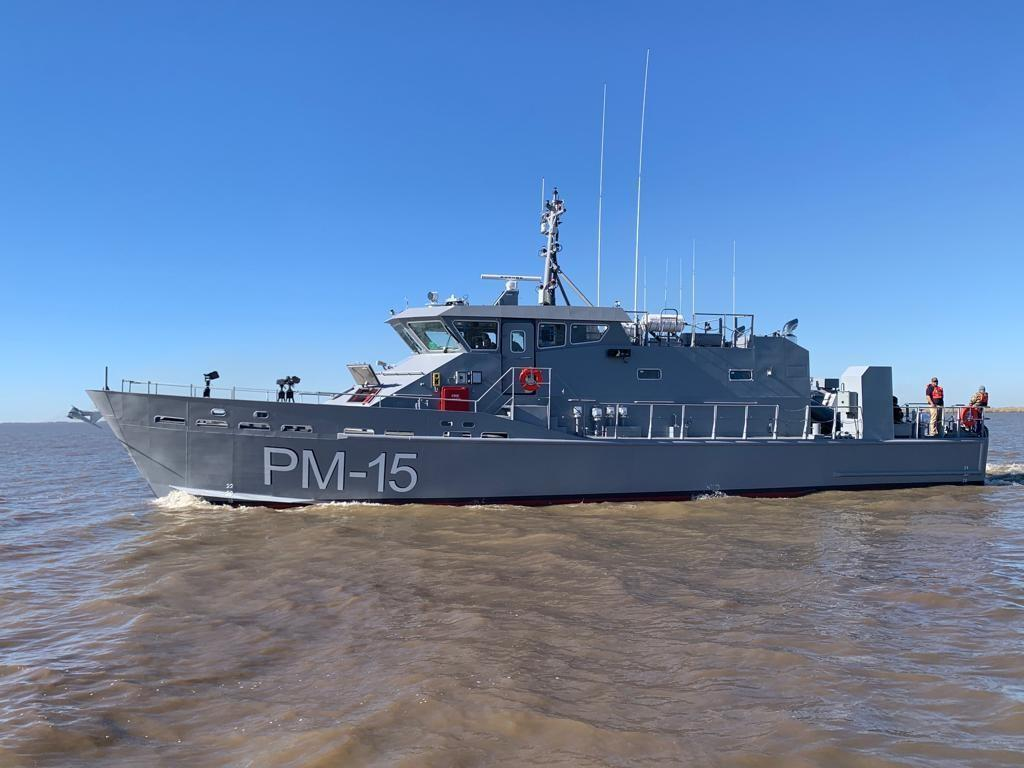
- PM-15

Class overview
- Name: Near Coastal Patrol Vessel
- Builders: Metal Shark Boats, Louisiana
- Cost: US$9 million
- Built: 2018–present
- Planned: 13
- Active: 4

General characteristics
- Type: Patrol boat
- Displacement: 55 tonne
- Length: 26.59 m (87 ft 3 in)
- Beam: 6.05 m (19 ft 10 in)
- Draft: 1.45 m (4 ft 9 in)
- Propulsion: 2 × Caterpillar C32 diesels, 2 shafts
- Speed: 25 knots (46 km/h; 29 mph)
- Range: 706 nmi (1,308 km; 812 mi) at 12 knots (22 km/h; 14 mph)
- Complement: 10

The United States is building 13 small patrol vessels, based on the Damen Stan 2606 patrol vessel design, for small Caribbean nations, to be known as the Defiant class. The United States Navy, which will play an oversight role in the ship's construction, also calls the design Near Coastal Patrol Vessels. The $54 million contract was awarded to Metal Shark Boats of Louisiana.

Partner nations include Dominican Republic, El Salvador, Honduras, Panama and Guatemala.

Like the United States Coast Guard's very successful Marine Protector class, also based on the Damen 2606 design, the Defiant-class vessels are to be equipped with a stern launching ramp.

The vessels will be able to accommodate a crew of ten or more—similar to the Marine Protector class. The vessels are powered by a pair of C32 Caterpillar 2,000 shaft horsepower (1,500 kW) diesel engines.

== Delivery ==
Delivery of Defiant-class patrol vessels
Name	Operator	Homeport	Commissioned	Retirement	Notes
Betelgeuse	Dominican Navy	Santo Domingo	2020-08-06		Betelgeuse GC-102 is the second ship in the Dominican Republic Navy to bear this name.; The handover was attended by Emilio Recio Segura, Estanislao Gonell Regalado, Richard Vásquez Jiménez and Ney Aldrín Bautista Almonte, the senior officers in the Dominican Navy, Army, Air Force and National Police.
Río Aguán	Honduran Navy		2021-07-09		
Patrullero 15	Navy of El Salvador		2021-07-22		
Gral. Omar Torrijos	National Aeronaval Service of Panama		2021-12-02		
Soberanía I	Costa Rican National Coast Guard Service		2023-04-01		

== See also ==
- Pacific-class patrol boat – in the late 1980s, Australia provided 12 Pacific Island countries with small patrol vessels
- Guardian-class patrol boat – Australian-built replacements for the patrol vessels it provided its neighbours, gifted to the same 12 Pacific Island nations and Timor-Leste
