= Richard Vásquez Jiménez =

Dominican Air Force officer

- Occupations: pilot, military officer
- Known for: Most senior military officer in the Dominican Republic

Richard Vásquez Jiménez was the most senior officer in the Dominican Air Force. On 8 January 2020, he was appointed Chief of the Dominican Joint Chiefs of Staff.
