= Response boat – Small II =

Class of US Coast Guard vessels

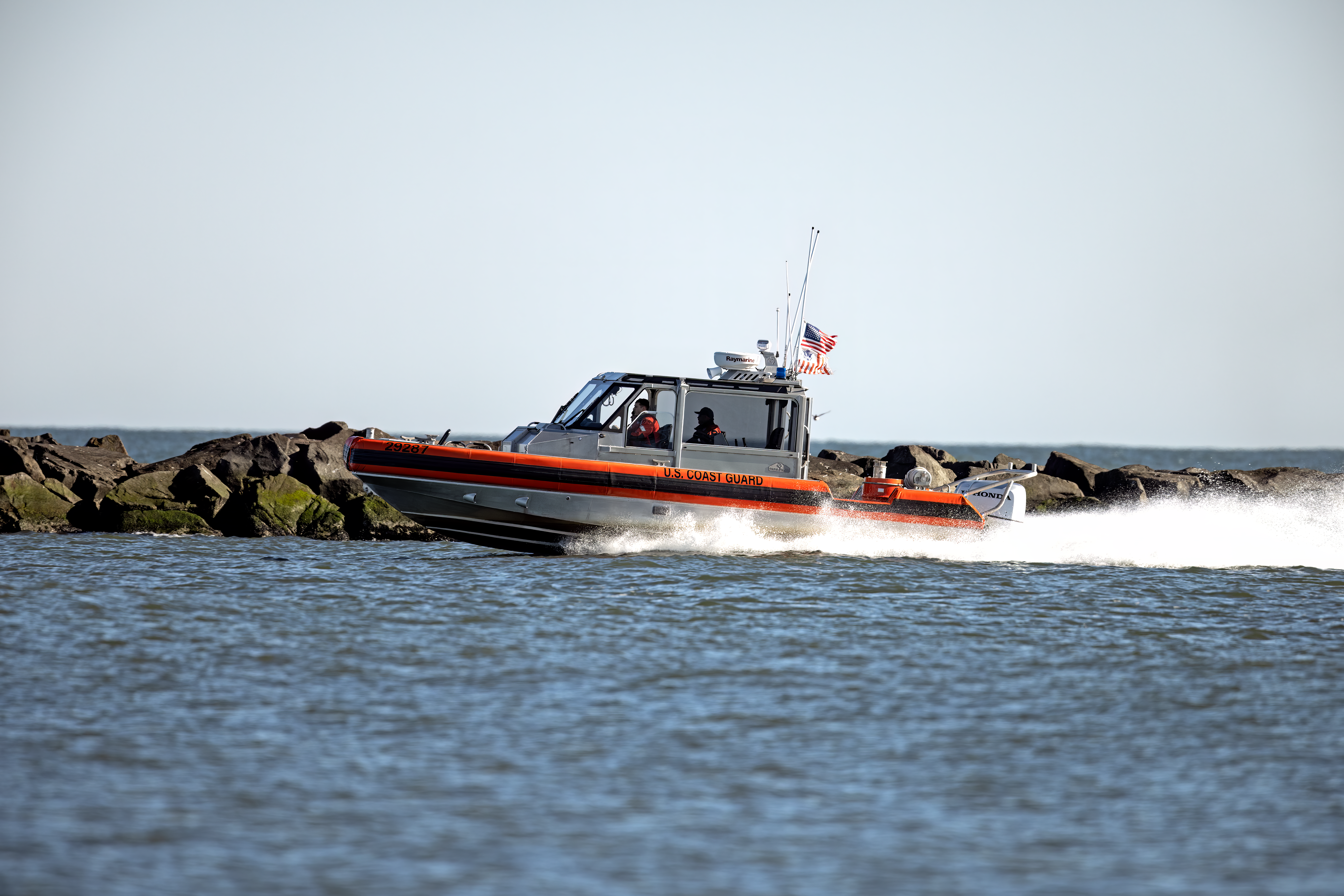
- A Response boat-Small II underway

Class overview
- Name: Response boat - Small II
- Builders: Metal Shark
- Operators: United States Coast Guard
- Preceded by: Defender-class
- Planned: 470
- Completed: 470

General characteristics
- Displacement: 8,300 pounds
- Length: 31 ft 8 inches
- Beam: 8 ft 5 inches
- Draft: 1 ft 8 inches
- Propulsion: Twin Honda 225 HP outboards
- Speed: 40+ knots
- Range: 150 nautical miles
- Sensors & processing systems: Communications and navigation suite; 2 NAVNET 3D displays
- Armament: 2 x M240B machine guns; Small arms
- Armour: Ballistic panels installed in the cabin

The Response boat - Small II, also known as RB-S II, is a small vessel in service in the US Coast Guard. The boats perform a variety of missions such has PWCS (Ports, Waterways, and Coastal Security), maritime law enforcement, counter narcotics operations, search and rescue, migrant interdiction, and environmental response operations.

== Design ==
The new design of the Response Boat-Small focuses more on crew comfort, visibility, safety, and protection. To improve visibility they have 360 degree visibility, for comfort they have an ergonomic design and shock mitigating seats, and for safety and protection they are equipped with ballistic protection to provide the crew small arms protection. The boats have fore and aft gun mounts for M240B machine guns. The boats can also carry a variety of small arms ranging from rifles, shotguns, and pistols. The boat is made of premium-grade 5086 aluminum alloy.

== See also ==
- Defender-class boat
- List of equipment of the United States Coast Guard
