= HMCS Vancouver =

Several Canadian naval units have been named HMCS Vancouver. One was named for the explorer George Vancouver, the others after the city of Vancouver.

Named for George Vancouver;

- HMCS Vancouver (F6A) (I) was a Thorneycroft S-class destroyer that served in the Royal Navy as HMS Toreador from 1919 until her transfer to the Royal Canadian Navy in 1928. The ship was decommissioned and scrapped in 1937.

Named for the city of Vancouver;

- HMCS Vancouver (K225) (II) was a Flower-class corvette that was renamed HMCS Kitchener (K225) before her launch in November 1941.
- HMCS Vancouver (K240) (III) was a Flower-class corvette that served in the Second World War. Vancouver served from its commission in March 1942 to the end of the war, when it was taken out of service in June 1945.
- HMCS Vancouver (IV) was a survey ship launched in June 1965 and sold in 1982.
- HMCS Vancouver (FFH 331) (V) is a Halifax-class frigate serving in the Canadian Forces since 1993.

== Battle honours ==
- Aleutians, 1942-43.
- Atlantic, 1944–45
- Arabian Sea

== See also ==
- HMS Vancouver
