= Defender-class boat =

Class of patrol boat

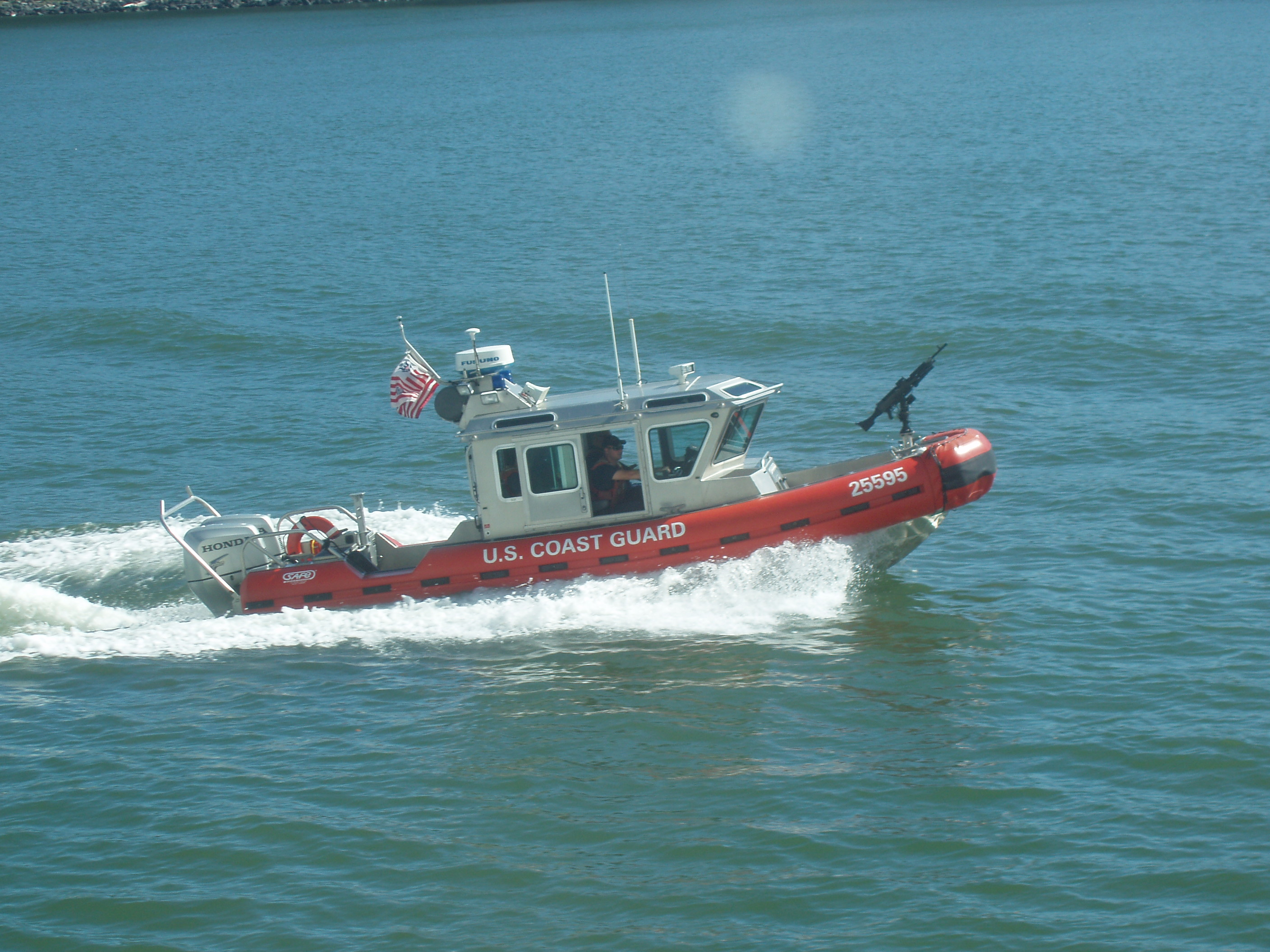
- Defender-class boat

Class overview
- Name: Defender class
- Builders: SAFE Boats International
- Operators: See Operators
- Subclasses: Defender "A" Class Defender "B" Class Defender "C" Class
- In service: 2002–present
- Completed: 800
- Active: 800

General characteristics
- Displacement: 8.5 long tons (8.6 t)
- Length: 8.9 m (29 ft 2 in) (A class); 9 m (29 ft 6 in) (B class)
- Beam: 2.6 m (8 ft 6 in)
- Draught: 0.98 m (3 ft 3 in)
- Propulsion: 2 × Honda 4-stroke outboard engines, 225 hp (168 kW) each
- Speed: 46 knots (85 km/h; 53 mph) maximum; 35 knots (65 km/h; 40 mph) cruising
- Range: 175 nmi (324 km; 201 mi) (A class); 150 nmi (280 km; 170 mi) (B class)
- Complement: 4 crew, 6 passengers
- Armament: 1–2 × M240B (A and B classes); 1 × M2HB, 2 × M240B (C class); M60 machine gun

The Defender-class boat, also called Response Boat–Small (RB-S) and Response Boat–Homeland Security (RB-HS), is a standard boat introduced by the United States Coast Guard in 2002. The boats serve a variety of missions, including search and rescue, port security and law enforcement duties and replaces a variety of smaller non-standard boats.

The design length of the hull is 25 feet (7.6 m) and the boat is officially referred to as such. However, the overall length with engines mounted is approximately 29 feet (8.8 m). Powered by twin 225 hp (168 kW) outboard motors, they are capable of speeds in excess of 46 knots (85 km/h; 53 mph) and have a range of 150 to 175 nautical miles (278 to 324 km; 173 to 201 mi), depending on the class. The boat requires a minimum crew of two persons, but has a carrying capacity for ten persons. The boat is easily trailerable and can be transported by a C-130 Hercules aircraft or truck.

Although similar in appearance to a rigid-hulled inflatable boat, the Defender is actually an aluminum-hulled vessel, equipped with a rigid foam-filled flotation collar. The first generation of boats were built by SAFE Boats International of Bremerton, Washington, a vendor of government and law enforcement boats. The replacement second generation was ordered in 2011 from Metal Shark Boats.

== Design ==
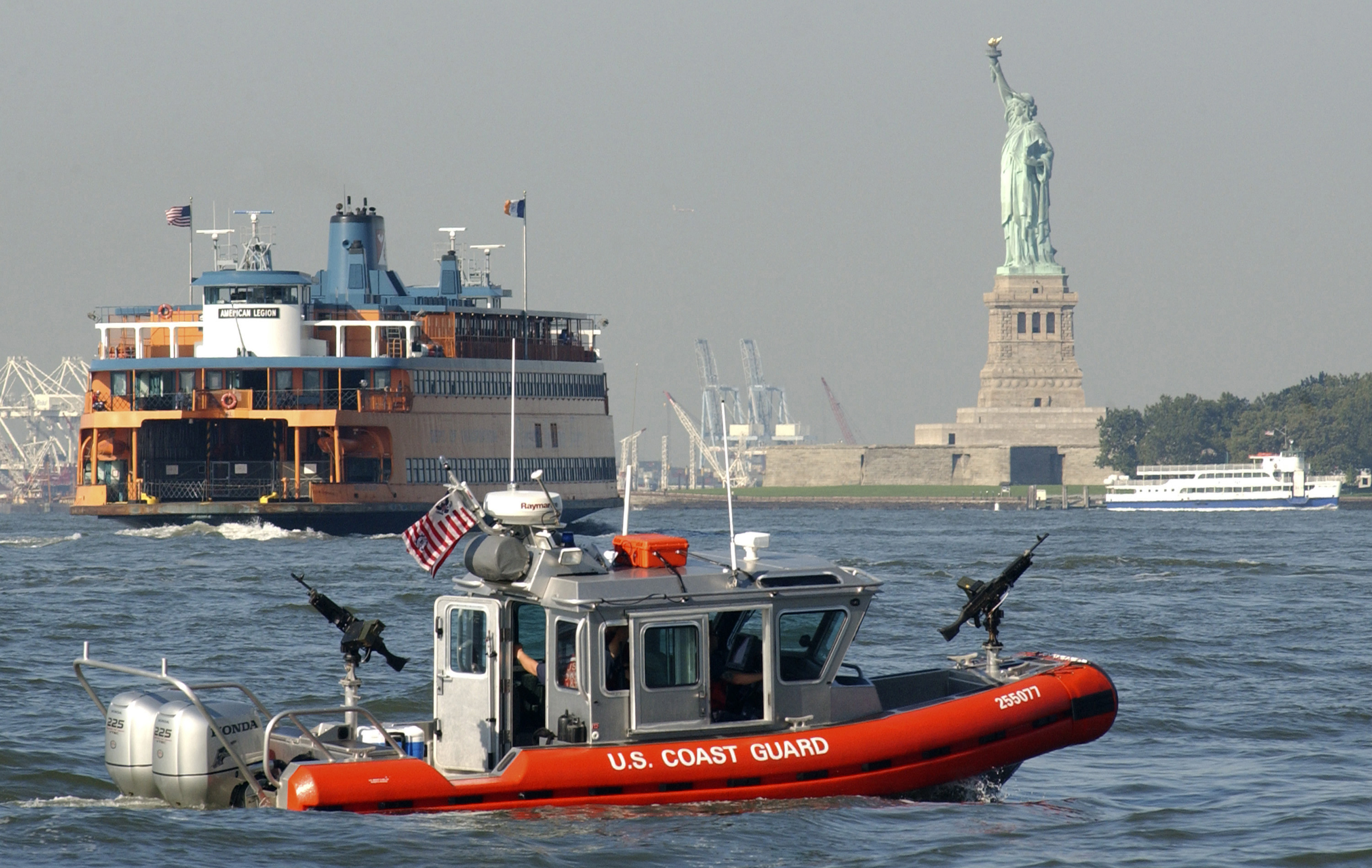
A 25-foot (8 m) Defender A-class boat from Maritime Safety and Security Team 91106 in New York Harbor

The Defender class utilizes a rigid deep-V hull constructed of marine grade aluminum. While similar in appearance to the sponson of a rigid-hulled inflatable boat the Defenders' collar is actually made from rigid polyethylene foam. The boat is powered by two 225 horsepower (168 kW) outboard engines, usually Honda four-strokes though Mercury and Johnson engines have also been used. Tow bitts are fitted forward and aft which also serve as mounting points for M240B or M60 machine guns.

== Variants ==
=== A class ===
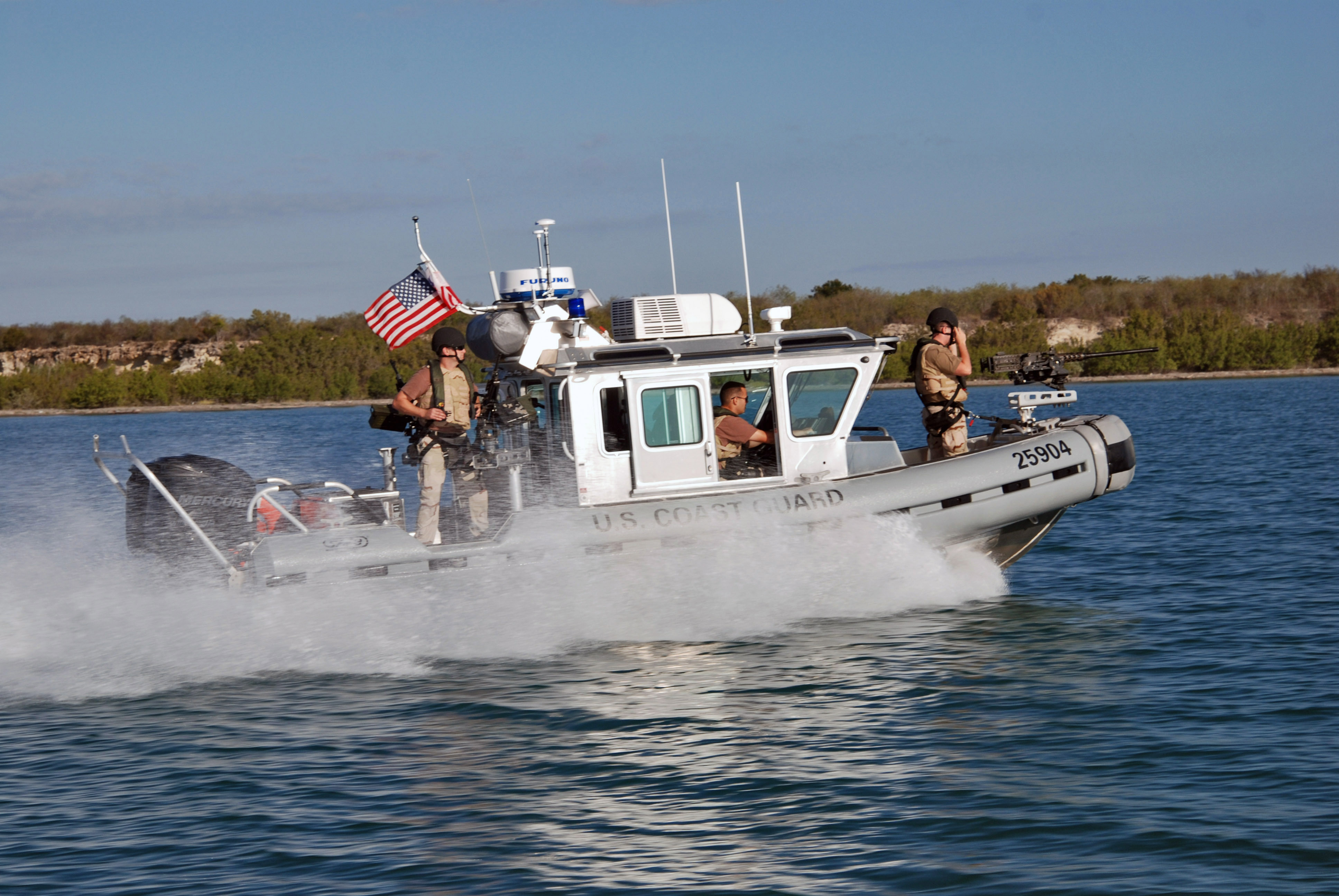
A Defender C-class boat on patrol near Guantanamo Bay

The Defender A class or Response Boat–Homeland Security (RB-HS) was the first version of the Defender class and entered service in 2002. Some A-class boats in service with the Maritime Security Response Team (MSRT) have gray collars instead of the more common orange.

=== B class ===
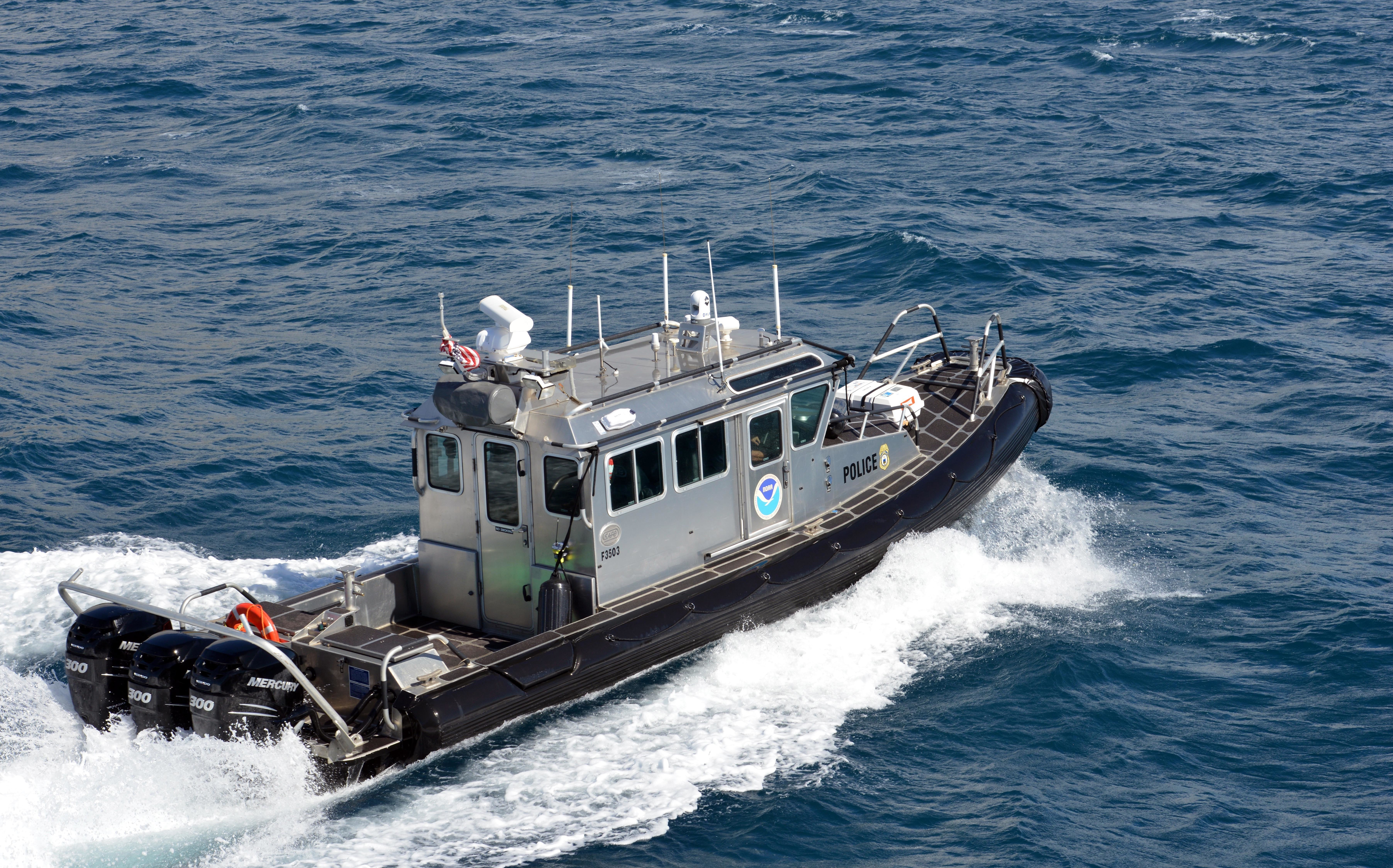
NOAA law enforcement operate Defender class boat offshore during Operation Kohola Guardian in Maui, Hawaii

The Defender B class, also known as the Response Boat–Small (RB-S) is a further development of the A class. First entering service in 2003 it has a slightly longer cabin, additional spotter windows aft, shock mitigating cabin seats, a smaller 105 US gallons (400 L; 87 imp gal) fuel tank, and various other minor changes. It is the most common of the three classes.

=== C class ===
The Defender C class, sometimes known as the Response Boat Small–Charlie, is a modification of the B class and was designed as a replacement for the aging 25-foot (7.6 m) Transportable Port Security Boats (TPSB) currently used by Port Security Units. The C class has a gray foam collar, a cabin climate control system, and an increased armament of one M2HB .50-caliber machine gun on a modified forward mount and two M240B machine guns on port and starboard mounts just aft of the cabin.

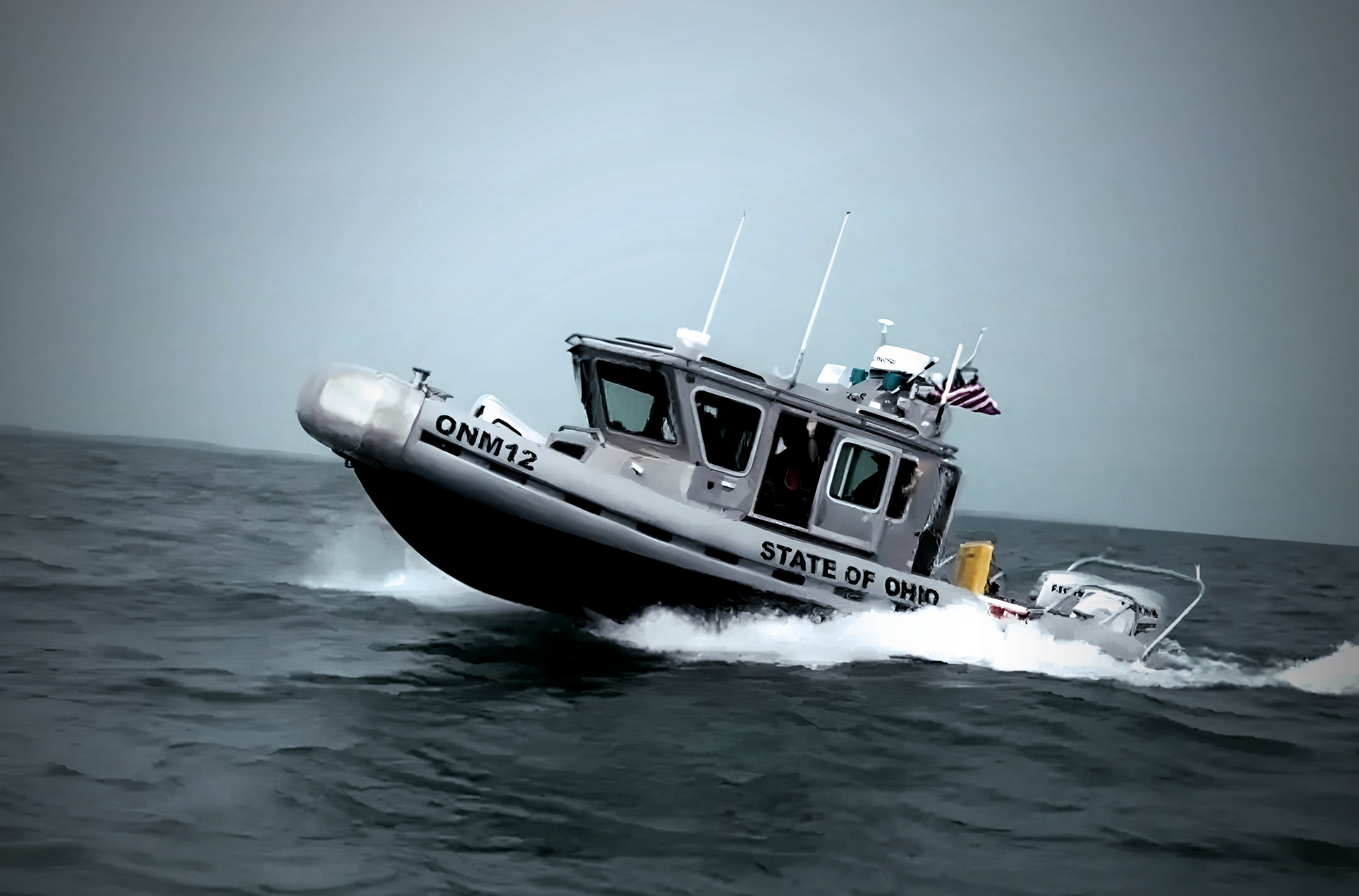
Defender-class boat in service with the Ohio Naval Militia patrolling Lake Erie 2024

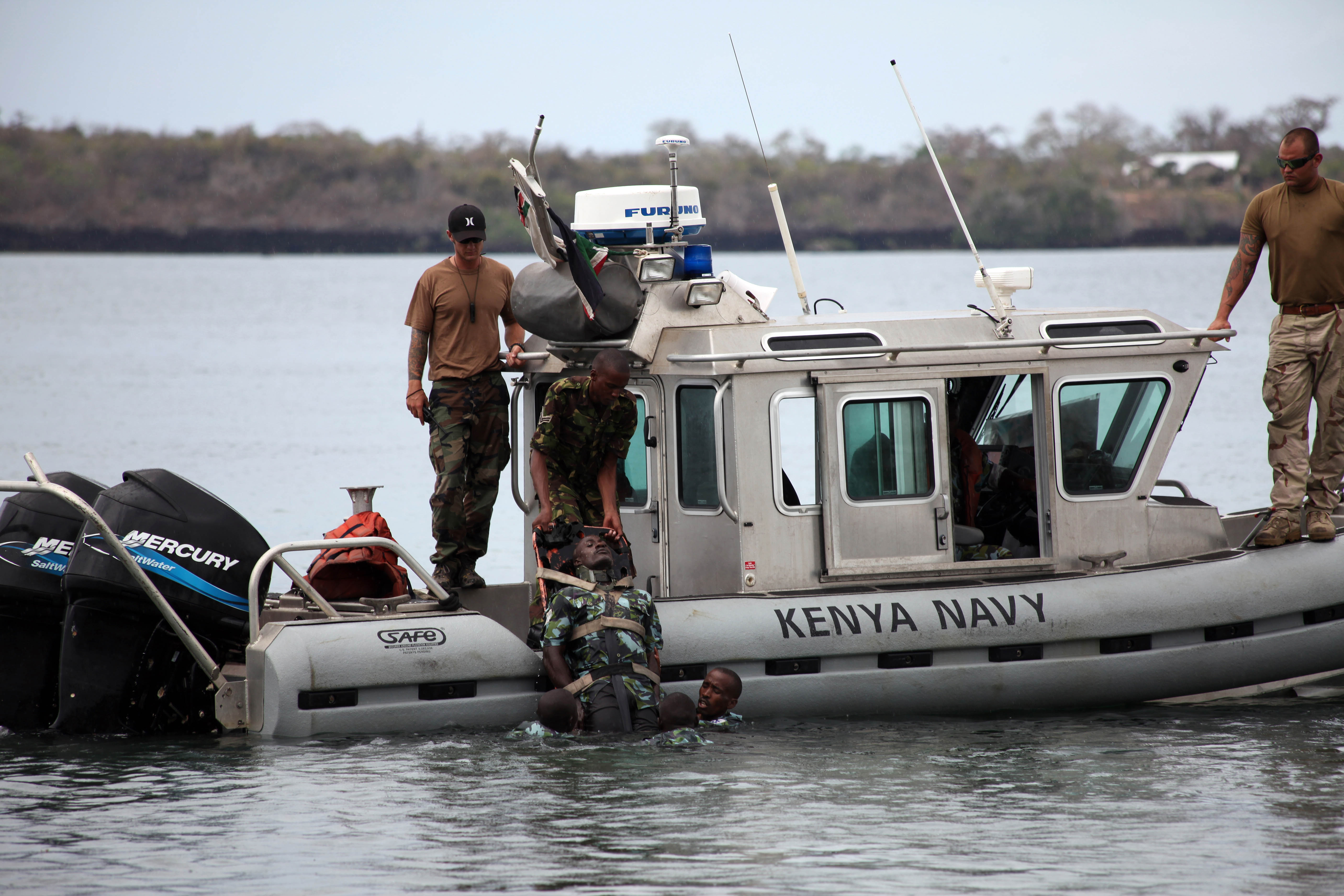
A Defender-class boat in service with the Kenya Navy Special Boat Unit in 2010

The first C-class boats were delivered to Port Security Unit 305 in May 2008 for testing and entered operational service at Naval Station Guantanamo Bay, Cuba in 2009.

== Service life and replacement ==
With the Defender-class boats nearing the end of their ten-year service life, the United States Coast Guard issued a request for proposal for replacement design for the Response Boat-Small. The request called for a 25–30-foot (7.6–9.1 m) boat, with weapon mounts, a minimum speed of 40 knots (74 km/h; 46 mph), and a range of at least 150 nautical miles (280 km; 170 mi).

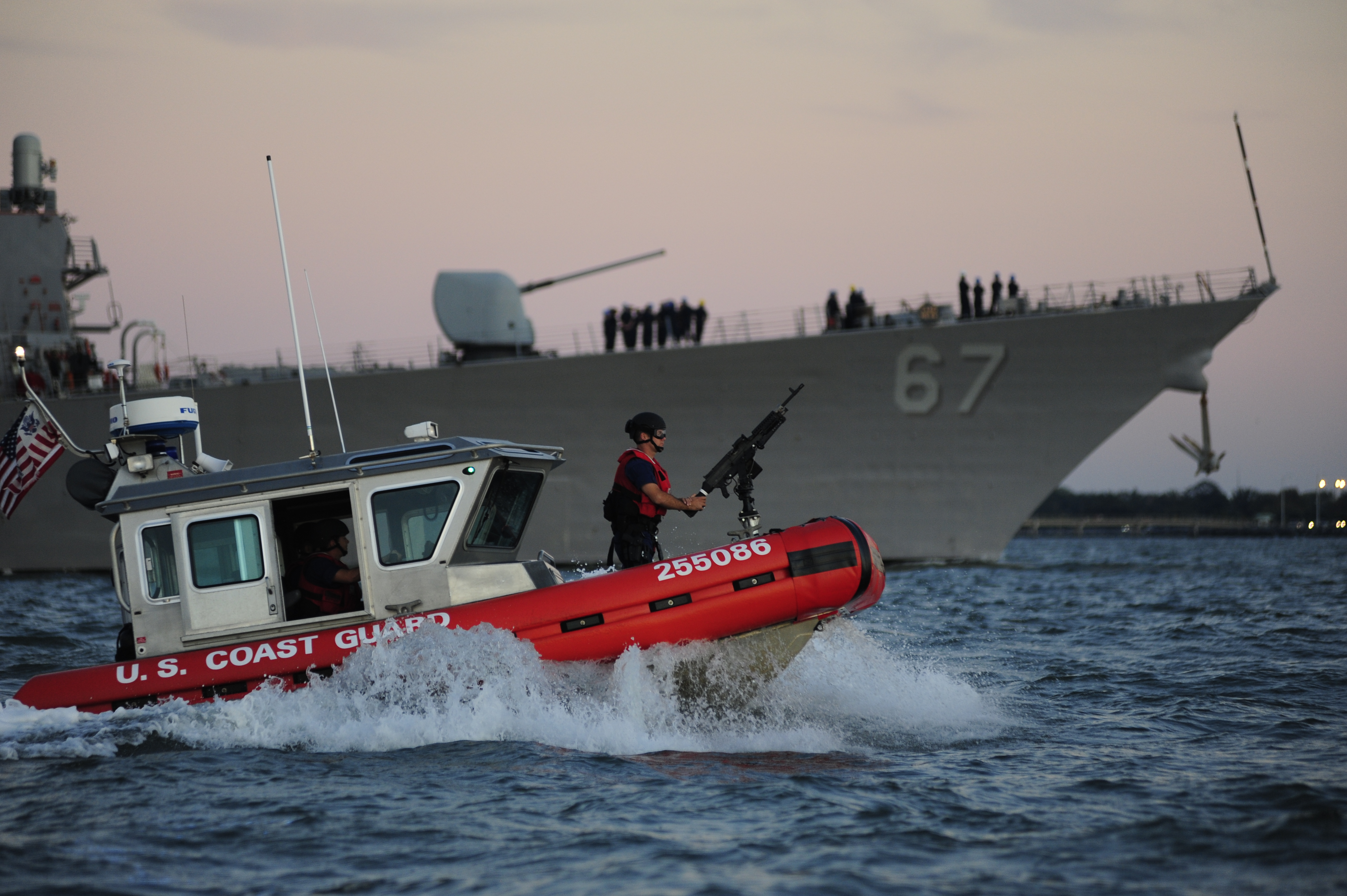
USS Cole (rear) under escort 2011

Contracts were awarded for two boats, one from SAFE Boats International and one from Metal Shark Aluminum Boats, for testing and on September 26, 2011 the Coast Guard awarded a contract to Metal Shark Boats for the production of 38 Response Boats-Small. In November, Metal Shark was awarded a $192 million contract for up to 500 response boats—470 to replace the entirety of the Coast Guard's 2002-built fleet, 20 for the US Border Patrol, and 10 for the US Navy.

== Operators ==
- Antigua and Barbuda Coast Guard
- Bangladesh Navy
- Bangladesh Coast Guard
- Belize Coast Guard
- Royal Canadian Navy Naval Security Team
- Chilean Navy
- Colombian National Navy
- Djiboutian Navy
- Iraqi Navy
- Israeli Navy
- Israel Police
- Kenya Navy
- (Liberia) Liberian Coast Guard
- Maritime Squadron of the Armed Forces of Malta
- Mexican Navy
- Nigerian Navy
- Pakistan Navy 9 units operated by Pakistan Maritime Security Agency.
- Philippines Coast Guard 4 units Acquired via US FMS Program. Additional units scheduled for delivery.
- Somaliland Coast Guard
- (Togo) Togolese Armed Forces operates one
- United States Navy
- United States Coast Guard
- U.S. Customs and Border Protection
- U.S. NOAA Division of Law Enforcement
- Ohio Naval Militia
- Virginia Marine Police

== See also ==
- Equipment of the United States Coast Guard
- Response boat-medium
