= List of presidential trips made by Barack Obama (2015) =

This is a list of presidential trips made by Barack Obama during 2015, the seventh year of his presidency as the 44th president of the United States.

This list excludes trips made within Washington, D.C., the U.S. federal capital in which the White House, the official residence and principal workplace of the president, is located. Additionally excluded are trips to Camp David, the country residence of the president, and to the private home of the Obama family in Kenwood, Chicago, Illinois.

== January ==
Country/ U.S. state	Areas visited	Dates	Details	Image
Michigan	Wayne	January 7	President Obama delivered remarks at the Ford Motor Co.'s Michigan Assembly Plant.	
Arizona	Phoenix	January 8	President Obama delivered remarks at the Central High School about home purchases and refinancing.	
Tennessee	Knoxville, Clinton	January 9	President Obama delivered remarks at Pellissippi State Community College about the college affordability initiative. Afterwards he visited the research company Techmer PM and delivered remarks.	
Virginia	Arlington	January 13	President Obama visited the National Cybersecurity and Communications Integration Center.	
Iowa	Cedar Falls	January 14	President Obama visited the Cedar Falls Utilities and delivered remarks on internet access.	
Maryland	Baltimore	January 15	President Obama met with Senate Democrats and attended the annual issues conference for Senate Democrats.	
Idaho	Boise	January 21	President Obama tours the New Product Development Lab at Boise State University.	
Kansas	Lawrence	January 22	President Obama delivered remarks at University of Kansas about expanded child care tax credits and other middle-class benefits.	
India	New Delhi	January 25–27	President Obama attended the Indian Republic Day. He met with Indian President Pranab Mukherjee and Indian Prime Minister Narendra Modi. He also met with Nobel Peace Prize winner Kailash Satyarthi.	
Saudi Arabia	Riyadh	January 27	President Obama traveled to Saudi Arabia to pay respect to late King Abdullah. He also met with the newly enthroned King Salman.	
Pennsylvania	Philadelphia	January 29	President Obama delivered remarks at the House Democratic Issues Conference.	

== February ==
Country/ U.S. state	Areas visited	Dates	Details	Image
Indiana	Indianapolis	February 6	President Obama delivered remarks about middle-class economics at Ivy Tech Community College.	
California	Palo Alto, San Francisco	February 12–13	President Obama attended the Stanford Cybersecurity Summit at Stanford University. Afterwards he attended a fundraiser.	
Illinois	Chicago	February 19	President Obama delivered remarks at Gwendolyn Brooks College to designate the Pullman Historic District a national monument.	
Florida	Miami	February 25	President Obama participated in an immigration town hall at Florida International University.	

== March ==
Country/ U.S. state	Areas visited	Dates	Details	Image
South Carolina	Columbia	March 6	President Obama delivered remarks at Benedict College about an initiative aimed at mobilizing public and private resources to help young minority men.	
Alabama	Selma	March 7	President Obama delivered remarks standing on Edmund Pettus Bridge to commemorate the "Bloody Sunday" march of 1965.	
Georgia	Atlanta	March 10	President Obama delivered an address at the McCamish Pavilion at Georgia Tech on his "Student Bill of Rights" plan. Afterwards he attended a fundraiser at Hyatt Regency Atlanta in downtown Atlanta.	
California	Los Angeles	March 12	President Obama filmed his appearance on Jimmy Kimmel Live! and participated in a round table discussion with donors to the Democratic National Committee.	
Arizona	Phoenix	March 13	President Obama met with the veteran community at the Carl T. Hayden VA Medical Center.	
Ohio	Cleveland	March 18	President Obama toured MAGNET (Manufacturing Advocacy and Growth Network) at Cleveland State University. Afterwards he delivered remarks regarding middle class economics at the City Club of Cleveland.	
Maryland	National Harbor	March 23	President Obama hosted the SelectUSA Investment Summit.	
Alabama	Birmingham	March 26	President Obama delivered remarks on the economy at Lawson State Community College.	
Massachusetts	Boston	March 30	President Obama attended the opening ceremony at the Edward M. Kennedy Institute and delivered remarks.	

== April ==
Country/ U.S. state	Areas visited	Dates	Details	Image
Kentucky	Louisville	April 2	President Obama visited the offices of the Louisville-based technological company, Indatus.	
Utah	Hill Air Force Base, Salt Lake City	April 2–3	President Obama delivered a speech on solar power at the Hill Air Force Base.	
Jamaica	Kingston	April 8–10	President Obama met with Prime Minister Portia Simpson-Miller and other leaders of the Caribbean Community. The President also visited the Bob Marley Museum, attended a town hall meeting at the University of the West Indies, and laid a wreath at the National Heroes Park.	
Panama	Panama City	April 10–11	President Obama attended the 7th Summit of the Americas. Additionally, the President met with Cuban President Raúl Castro for the first time since the re-establishment of diplomatic relations between the United States and Cuba.	
North Carolina	Charlotte	April 15	President Obama delivered remarks at ImaginOn.	
Florida	Everglades National Park, Homestead	April 22	President Obama delivered a speech on climate change.	

== May ==
Country/ U.S. state	Areas visited	Dates	Details	Image
New York	New York City	May 4	President Obama delivered a speech at Lehman College to launch his "My Brother's Keeper Alliance" initiative and filmed his final appearance on Late Show with David Letterman at the Ed Sullivan Theater. He also attended Democratic Party fundraising events.	
Oregon	Portland, Beaverton	May 7	President Obama attended the 2016 White House Victory Fund, a fundraising event hosted by the Democratic National Committee, at the Sentinel Hotel. He also visited the Nike, Inc. headquarters in Beaverton to promote a free trade agreement.	
South Dakota	Watertown	May 8	President Obama delivered a commencement speech at the Lake Area Technical Institute. This visit marked his visit to all 50 states of the United States as president.	
New Jersey	Camden	May 18	President Obama met with the Camden County Police Department to discuss efforts in local community policing.	
Connecticut	New London, Stamford	May 20	President Obama delivered a commencement speech focused on climate change and national security at the United States Coast Guard Academy in New London, before attending a fundraising event for the Democratic National Committee in Stamford.	
Virginia	Arlington	May 25	President Obama participated in Memorial Day ceremonies at Arlington National Cemetery.	
Florida	Miami	May 27–28	President Obama visited the National Hurricane Center and attended fundraising events.	

== June ==
Country/ U.S. state	Areas visited	Dates	Details	Image
Delaware	Wilmington	June 6	President Obama and the First Family attended the funeral of Beau Biden, the eldest son of Vice President Joe Biden, at St. Anthony's Roman Catholic Church, where President Obama also delivered a eulogy for Biden.	
Germany	Krün	June 7–8	President Obama attended the 41st G7 summit. He also met with Chancellor Angela Merkel for a traditional Frühschoppen breakfast with the village locals in Krün.	
California	Los Angeles, San Francisco	June 18–20	In the Greater Los Angeles Area, President Obama attended two fundraising events for the Democratic National Committee, before attending a round table discussion at the residence of television producer and writer Chuck Lorre in Pacific Palisades and a dinner at the residence of actor and director Tyler Perry in Beverly Hills. He also met with comedian Marc Maron at his residence in Highland Park, where he taped his appearance for Maron's podcast, WTF with Marc Maron. In the San Francisco Bay Area, President Obama attended the annual meeting of the United States Conference of Mayors. He also attended fundraising events for the Democratic National Committee and the Democratic Congressional Campaign Committee.	
South Carolina	Charleston	June 26	President Obama, along with First Lady Michelle Obama, Vice President Joe Biden, former Secretary of State Hillary Clinton, and House Speaker John Boehner, attended the funeral for South Carolina Senator Clementa C. Pinckney, who was among those killed at the Charleston church shooting. The President also delivered a eulogy for Pinckney.	

== July ==
Country/ U.S. state	Areas visited	Dates	Details	Image
Tennessee	Madison, Nashville	July 1	President Obama delivered a speech on health care at Taylor Stratton Elementary School.	
Wisconsin	La Crosse	July 2	President Obama delivered a speech on the economy at University of Wisconsin–La Crosse.	
Pennsylvania	Philadelphia	July 14	President Obama delivered remarks on criminal justice reforms at the 106th NAACP Convention.	
Oklahoma	Durant, El Reno	July 15–16	In Durant, President Obama delivered remarks on the economy at the headquarters of the Choctaw Nation. In El Reno, President Obama visited the Federal Correctional Institution, becoming the first sitting U.S. president to visit a federal prison.	
New York	New York City	July 17–18	President Obama attended a Democratic National Committee fundraiser.	
Pennsylvania	Pittsburgh	July 21	President Obama addressed the 116th Veterans of Foreign Wars National Convention, in light of the 2015 Chattanooga shootings.	
New York	New York City	July 21	President Obama taped his third and final appearance on The Daily Show. He also attended a Democratic Senatorial Campaign Committee fundraiser.	
Kenya	Nairobi	July 24–26	On July 24–26, 2015, President Obama traveled to Kenya for a three-day state visit, becoming the first sitting U.S. president to visit the country. His father, Barack Obama, Sr., was a native of the Kenyan village Nyang'oma Kogelo. President Obama arrived at the Jomo Kenyatta International Airport in the Kenyan capital Nairobi on the evening of Friday, July 24, where he was welcomed in the tarmac by Kenyan President Uhuru Kenyatta and his half-sister Auma. After arriving, Obama dined with other members of his paternal family at a restaurant in his hotel. On Saturday, July 25, President Obama delivered remarks at the 2015 Global Entrepreneurship Summit held at the United Nations Office at Nairobi, where he urged African entrepreneurs to promote security and development while working towards economic growth in the African continent. He also visited an innovation fair organized to promote his "Power Africa" initiative of promoting electric power and renewable energy in the Sub-Saharan Africa. Later that day, President Obama laid a wreath and paid his respects at a memorial honoring the victims of the 1998 U.S. embassy bombings. Obama then headed to the State House for an official welcoming ceremony and a bilateral meeting with President Kenyatta, where the two presidents mainly discussed counter-terrorism with regards to dealing with al-Shabaab. In the evening, the President was hosted a state dinner by President Kenyatta. On Sunday, July 26, President Obama delivered a speech addressing the Kenyan people at the Safaricom Indoor Arena. In his speech, he urged Kenyans to eradicate corruption, confront terrorism, and combat inequality, saying: "You can choose the path to progress, but it requires making some important choices... it means continuing down the path of a strong, more inclusive, more accountable and transparent democracy" to "help you extend opportunity, and educate youth, and face down threats, and embrace reconciliation." Before departing Kenya, Obama met with civil society groups at Kenyatta University and toured the Nairobi National Park.	
Ethiopia	Addis Ababa	July 26–28	President Obama became the first sitting U.S. president to travel to Ethiopia. On July 27, President Obama met with Ethiopian prime minister Hailemariam Desalegn at the National Palace; talks focused on the Somali Islamist militant group al-Shabaab and other security threats, as well as on human rights in Ethiopia. Obama also held talks with Kenyan and Ugandan leaders, discussing the South Sudan crisis. The following day, Obama visited the African Union headquarters (Mandela Hall) and delivered remarks there, calling upon African leaders to respect democracy and uphold human rights.	

== August ==
Country/ U.S. state	Areas visited	Dates	Details	Image
Nevada	Las Vegas	August 24	President Obama attended the National Clean Energy Summit.	
Louisiana	New Orleans	August 27	President Obama attended the decennial commemoration of Hurricane Katrina, where he met with recovering residents and delivered remarks at a community centre at the Lower Ninth Ward.	

== September ==
Country/ U.S. state	Areas visited	Dates	Details	Image
Alaska	Anchorage, Dillingham, Kotzebue, Seward	August 31 – September 3	See also: Global warming in the Arctic President Obama traveled to Anchorage and attended the GLACIER conference, regarding the effects of climate change in the Arctic. On his first night in the state, the President attended a reception at the Anchorage home of philanthropist Alice Rogoff. President Obama also visited the towns of Dillingham, Kotzebue and Seward. Upon visiting Kotzebue, President Obama became the first sitting U.S. president to cross the Arctic Circle. For the duration of his visit, the President stayed at the Hotel Captain Cook in Anchorage.	
Massachusetts	Boston	September 7	President Obama delivered a Labor Day breakfast address to the Greater Boston Labor Council at the Boston Park Plaza. The president paid tribute to Boston, the labor movement, and U.S. workers. Before departing Boston, Obama made an unscheduled stop at the historic Union Oyster House, meeting customers there. Aboard Air Force One, Obama met with Massachusetts' U.S. senators, Elizabeth Warren and Edward J. Markey, along with Massachusetts U.S. Representatives Katherine Clark and Seth Moulton, and New Hampshire U.S. Representative Ann McLane Kuster.	
Michigan	Warren	September 9	President Obama delivered a speech on free community colleges at the Michigan Technical Education Center. He was accompanied by Second Lady Jill Biden.	
Maryland	Fort Meade	September 11		
Iowa	Des Moines	September 14	President Obama visited the North High School with Secretary of Education Arne Duncan to participate in a town hall meeting, discussing college accessibility and affordability.	
New York	New York City	September 27–29	President Obama addressed the UN Sustainable Development Summit and the seventieth session of the United Nations General Assembly. He also met with Russian President Vladimir Putin.	

== October ==
Country/ U.S. state	Areas visited	Dates	Details	Image
Oregon	Roseburg	October 9	President Obama met privately with the survivors and the families of the victims of the 2015 Umpqua Community College shooting. During his visit, local gun rights activists protested against further gun control laws.	
Washington	Seattle	October 10	Obama arrived following a stop in Roseburg, Oregon where he visited families of victims of the shooting rampage at a community college there. Air Force One touched down at King County Airport around 3:45 p.m. He spoke at The Westin.	
California	San Francisco, Los Angeles, San Diego	October 10–11	President Obama first arrived in San Francisco, where he attended a private round table discussion with members of the Democratic National Committee and a fundraiser at The Warfield. The President then headed to Los Angeles to attend three fundraisers – one at the residence of director and producer J. J. Abrams, another at a private performance given by Jamie Foxx in Pacific Palisades, and the last hosted by interior designer Michael S. Smith and U.S. Ambassador to Spain James Costos. President Obama spent the remainder of his weekend in Rancho Santa Fe.	
West Virginia	Charleston	October 21	President Obama attended a community discussion regarding the issue of substance abuse, meeting with teachers, medical professionals, and members of law enforcement, among others. West Virginia has the highest rate of drug overdose-related deaths in the United States.	
Illinois	Chicago	October 27–28	President Obama attended the International Association of Chiefs of Police (IACP) conference at McCormick Place, addressing the issue of gun violence, gun control legislation, as well as criminal justice reform. Obama spoke at the IACP conference, attended two political fund raisers, and watched the Chicago Bulls play the Cleveland Cavaliers at the United Center.	

== November ==
Country/ U.S. state	Areas visited	Dates	Details	Image
New Jersey	Newark	November 2	President Obama traveled to Newark to address criminal justice reform, where he held a round table discussion and gave a speech at Rutgers University campus in Newark. He was accompanied during part of the trip by US Senator Cory Booker, and Newark Mayor Ras Baraka. Obama made a visit to Integrity House, a halfway house in Newark, meeting with ex-offenders in the home who are undergoing substance abuse rehabilitation and job training.	
New York	New York City	November 2	President Obama traveled to New York City to attend fundraisers for the Democratic National Committee and the Democratic Congressional Campaign Committee. While in Manhattan, Obama attended a showing of the Broadway musical Hamilton. Obama then returned to New Jersey before traveling back to the White House.	
Virginia	Arlington County	November 11	President Obama traveled to the Arlington National Cemetery on Veterans Day, laying a wreath on the Tomb of the Unknowns.	
Turkey	Antalya	November 14–17	President Obama attended the G-20 summit meeting in Antalya, where topics such as investment strategy, climate change, financial regulation, anti-corruption, and issues on trade and energy were discussed in an effort to strengthen the global economy and cooperation. According to National Security Advisor Susan Rice, President Obama also discussed "cybersecurity, refugees, global health security, and counter-terrorism" during the summit. He also met with Turkish President Recep Tayyip Erdoğan (to discuss efforts in managing the Syria–Turkey border, amidst the Syrian Civil War refugee crisis) and King Salman of Saudi Arabia. Additionally, President Obama met with Russian President Vladimir Putin in a 30-minute meeting to discuss efforts in tackling the Islamic State of Iraq and the Levant and other terrorist groups and resolving the Syrian Civil War, amidst disagreements with the United States regarding Russia's military intervention.	
Philippines	Manila, Pasay	November 17–20	President Obama attended the APEC Economic Leaders' Meeting in Manila, focusing on inclusive growth. On the sidelines of the summit in Manila, he held bilateral meetings with Philippine President Benigno Aquino III, Japanese Prime Minister Shinzō Abe and newly elected prime ministers Malcolm Turnbull of Australia and Justin Trudeau of Canada, as well as meetings with Trans-Pacific Partnership and Pacific Alliance leaders. President Obama also delivered remarks at a Philippine Navy coastal facility by Manila Bay, where he also toured the BRP Gregorio del Pilar (PF-15), to highlight the United States' commitment to assist in maritime security in the region, amidst the territorial disputes in the South China Sea. During his speech in front of the Philippine Navy, President Obama announced that the U.S. government will donate the research vessel RV Melville and two Hamilton-class cutters to the Philippine Navy, one of which will be the USCGC Boutwell (WHEC-719). He later participated at the APEC 2015 CEO Summit, where he met with Alibaba founder and executive chairman Jack Ma and SALt lamp inventor Aisa Mijeno and urged business executives to combat climate change.	
Malaysia	Kuala Lumpur	November 20–22	President Obama attended the Tenth East Asia Summit in Kuala Lumpur, which focused on military intervention against the Islamic State of Iraq and the Levant and the territorial disputes in the South China Sea. On the sidelines of the summit in Kuala Lumpur, the President met with refugees, many of which were Rohingya refugees, at the Dignity for Children Foundation refugee center to urge the acceptance of Syrian refugees into the United States, participated in the Young Southeast Asian Leaders Initiative (YSEALI) town hall at Taylor's University where he urged the Southeast Asian youth to fight against discrimination, and met with Malaysian civil society groups at a round table meeting at the Ritz-Carlton Kuala Lumpur. He also participated in a meeting with leaders of the ASEAN Summit, as well as separate meetings with Lao Prime Minister Thongsing Thammavong and Singaporean Prime Minister Lee Hsien Loong.	
France	Paris	November 29 – December 1	President Obama participated in the 2015 United Nations Climate Change Conference. On the sidelines of the conference, he joined President François Hollande and Paris Mayor Anne Hidalgo in paying respects to the victims of the Paris attacks by laying flowers in front of the Bataclan. Obama held separate bilateral meetings with Chinese President Xi Jinping and Indian Prime Minister Narendra Modi to "send a strong message to the world about their strong commitment to climate change," being three of the world's largest carbon dioxide emitters. Obama also met with Turkish President Recep Tayyip Erdoğan to discuss their intervention against ISIL, as well as to urge the reduction of tensions between Turkey and Russia following the Russian Sukhoi Su-24 shootdown by the Turkish Air Force.	

== December ==
Country/ U.S. state	Areas visited	Dates	Details	Image
California	San Bernardino	December 18	While en route to Honolulu for the First Family's Christmas vacation, President Obama stopped by San Bernardino, California to meet privately with the families of the victims of the San Bernardino attack.	

== See also ==
- List of international presidential trips made by Barack Obama
- Lists of presidential trips made by Barack Obama
