= Del Pilar-class offshore patrol vessel =

Class of Philippine Navy patrol vessels

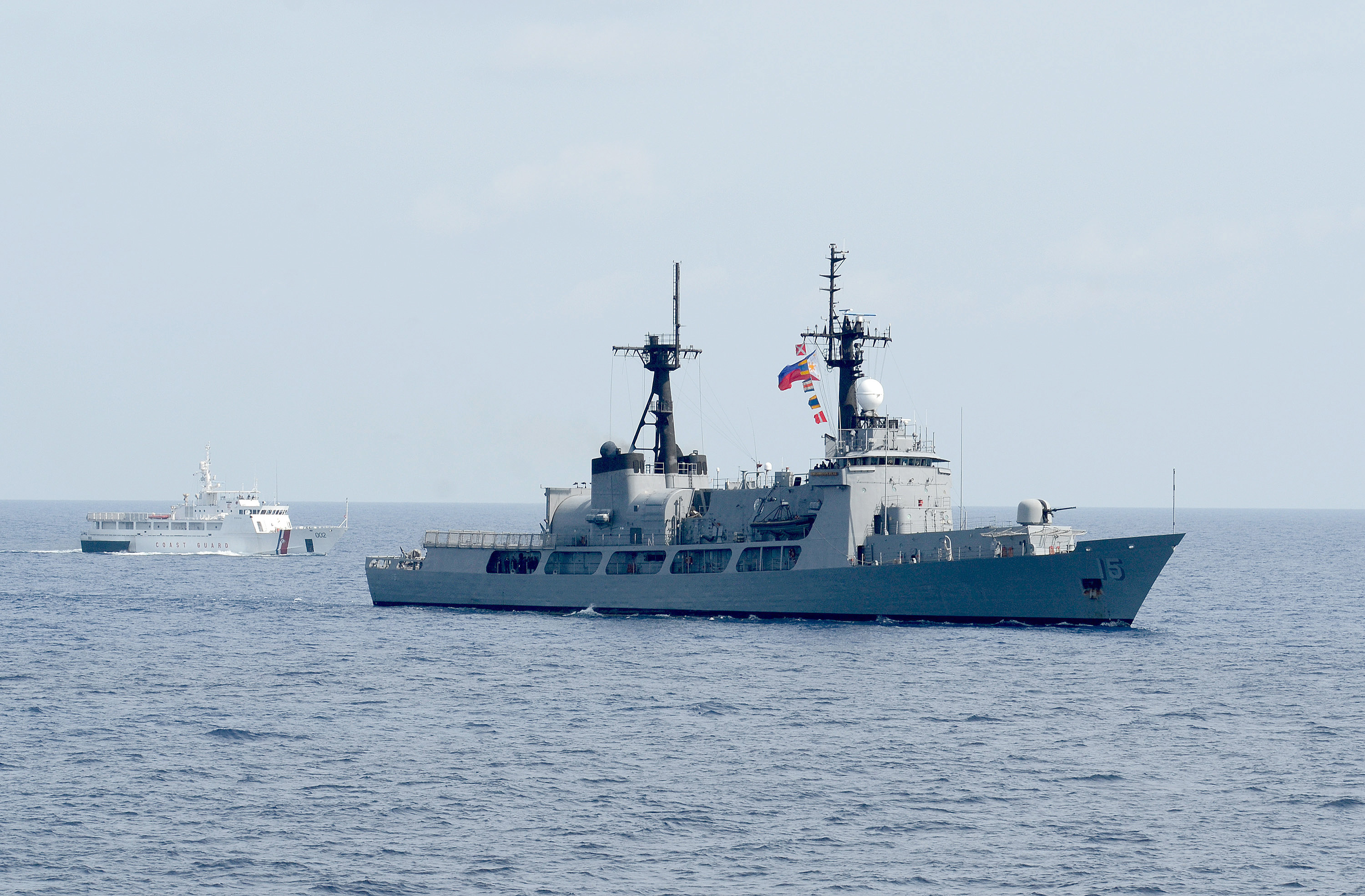
- BRP Gregorio del Pilar (PS-15)

Class overview
- Name: Gregorio del Pilar class
- Builders: Avondale Shipyards
- Operators: Philippine Navy
- In commission: 2011–present
- Completed: 3
- Active: 3

General characteristics
- Type: Frigate
- Displacement: 3,250 tons
- Length: 378 ft (115.2 m)
- Beam: 43 ft (13.1 m)
- Draft: 15 ft (4.6 m)
- Propulsion: Combined diesel or gas (CODOG) arrangement: 2 × Fairbanks-Morse 38TD8-1/8-12 12-cylinder diesel engines, each producing 3,500 shp (2,610 kW); 2 × Pratt & Whittney FT4A-6 gas turbines, each producing 18,000 shp (13,400 kW)
- Speed: 29 knots (54 km/h; 33 mph) via twin gas-turbines
- Range: 12,500 nmi (23,200 km; 14,400 mi) at 12 knots (22 km/h; 14 mph) via diesel
- Endurance: 45 days
- Boats & landing craft carried: 2 × RHIBs
- Complement: 80
- Sensors & processing systems: CMS: Naval Shield Baseline 2 integrated combat management system; Main radar: SeaGIRAFFE AMB multi-role 3D air-&-surface search-&-track; Secondary Radars: (Hull 15 & 16): SharpEye™ Mk.2 X-band (25kW) & S-band (200W) solid-state pulse-Doppler navigation & surface-search; (Hull 17): Furuno FAR3220BB X-band (25kW) & S-band (200W) solid-state navigation & surface-search; Fire Control suite: USN Mk.92 Mod.1 Fire Control System by Sperry; Optronic Sensors: SeaFLIR®230 color TV camera, low-light camera, thermal imager, LRF, laser pointer, NVIS; Sonar: ELAC Hunter 2.0 hull mounted sonar
- Electronic warfare & decoys: 2 × BAE Systems' Mark 36 SRBOC mortar-type countermeasures launching system; Elbit Systems' NS9003A RESM (radar - electronic support measures)
- Armament: 1 × OTO Melara 76/62C (Compatto/Compact) 76mm L/62 DP autocannon on a USN Mk.45 mount; 6 × M2 Browning M2HB 12.7mm (.50 caliber) heavy machine guns; Hull 40 only: 2 × Mk 38 Mod 3 RWS 25mm cannons by BAE Systems; Hull 41 and 42 only: 2 × Mk 38 Mod 2 RWS 25mm cannons
- Armour: CBRNE defense system
- Aircraft carried: 1 × AW109E Power naval helicopter
- Aviation facilities: Helideck; Hangar: partly-fixed and partly-retractable
- Notes: Steel hull, aluminium superstructure

The Del Pilar class are frigates currently in service with the Philippine Navy and previously in service with the US Coast Guard as Hamilton-class high endurance cutters. The Department of National Defense is currently in the process of upgrading their systems and capabilities under a modernization project awarded to Hanwha Systems of South Korea.

== History ==
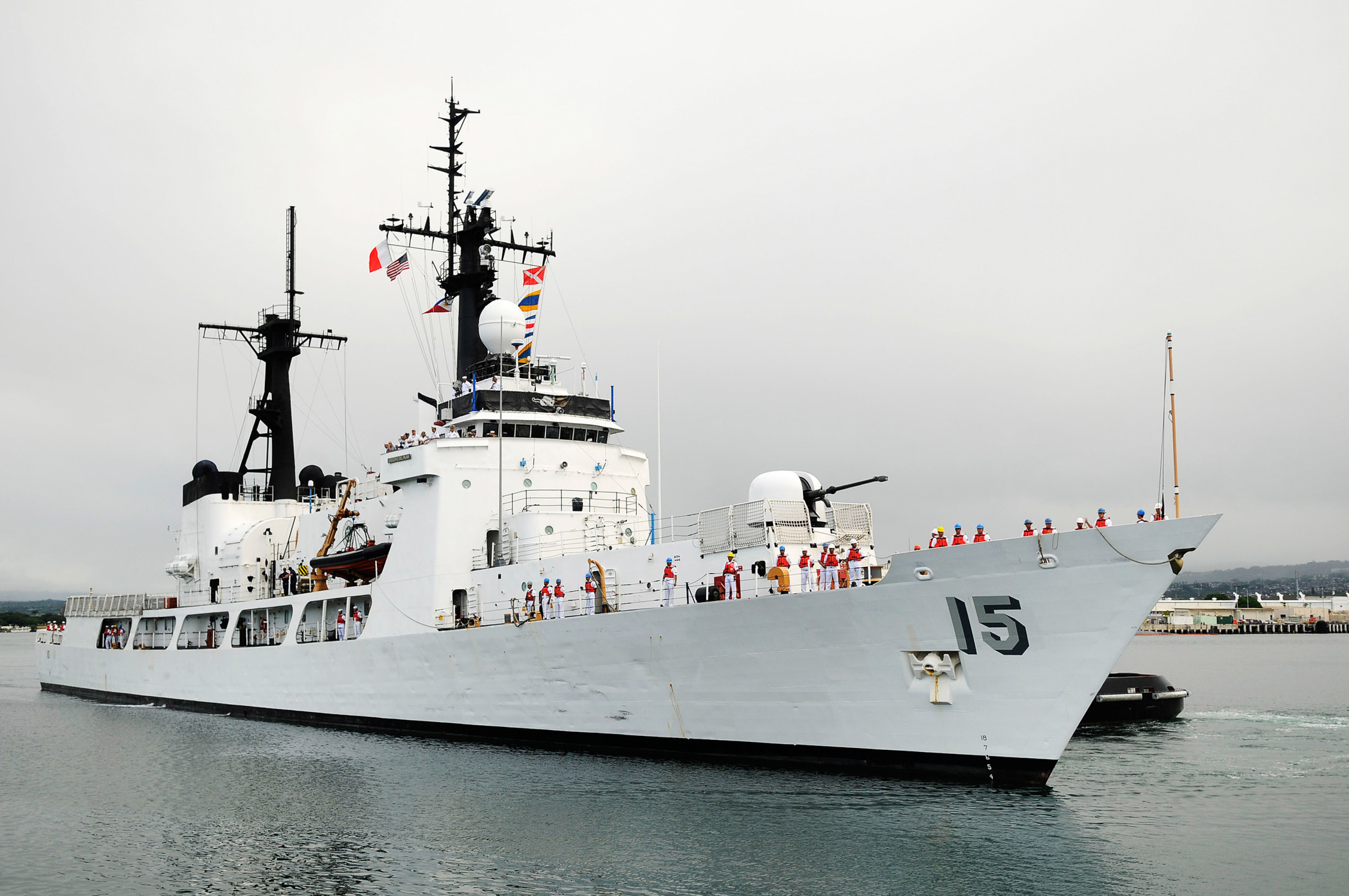
BRP Gregorio del Pilar

Early in 2011, the Philippine Navy announced the acquisition of an ex-US Coast Guard Hamilton-class high-endurance cutter under the "Ocean-going Escort Vessel" project through the US Excess Defense Article programme. The ship acquired was the former USCGC Hamilton (WHEC-715), renamed BRP Gregorio del Pilar (PF-15) which was officially turned over to the Philippine Navy on May 13, 2011, at Alameda Point in California. It was retrofitted and modified in the US, replacing systems removed by the USCG. The ship's arrival ceremonies were on August 23, 2011, in Manila, and it was commissioned on December 14, 2011.

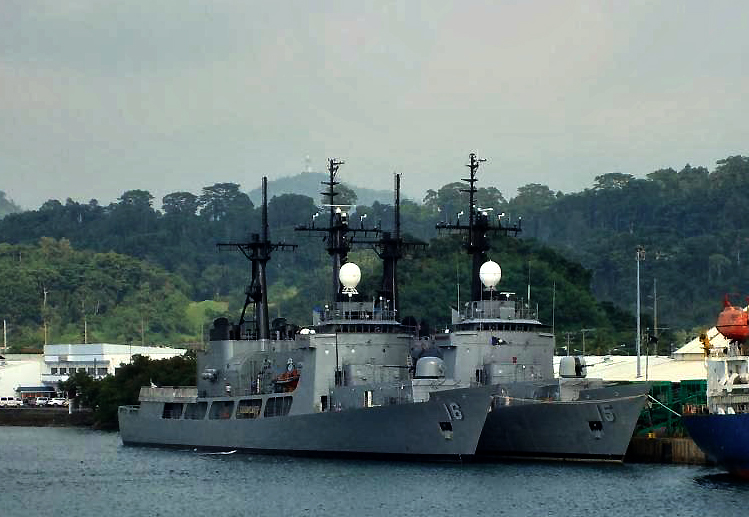
BRP Gregorio del Pilar and BRP Ramon Alcaraz

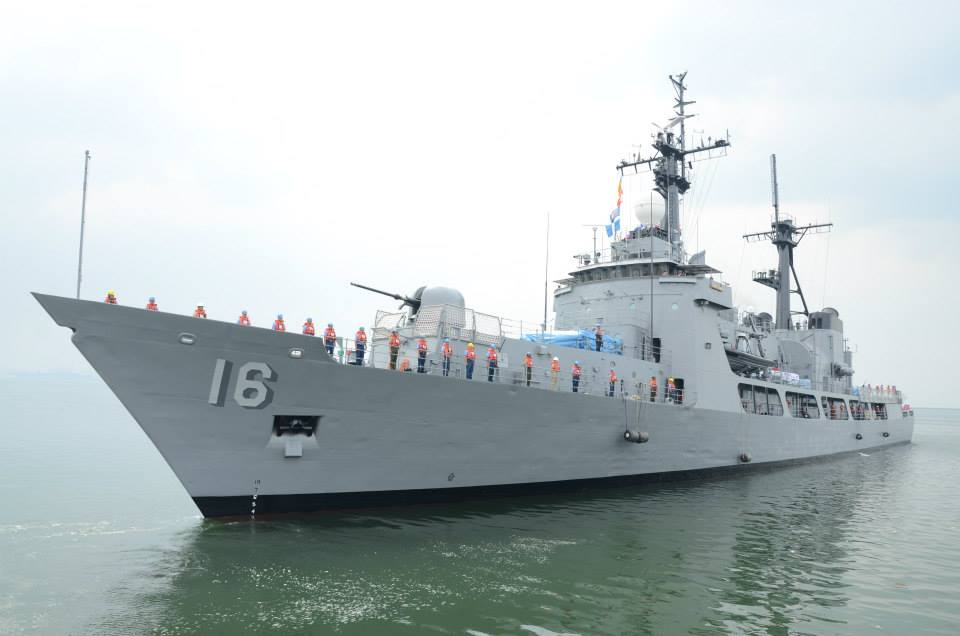
BRP Ramon Alcaraz

A second Hamilton-class cutter, USCGC Dallas (WHEC-716), was turned over to the Philippine Navy on May 22, 2012 with ceremonies held at the Federal Law Enforcement Training Center Pier Papa in North Charleston, South Carolina. The ship was named BRP Ramon Alcaraz (PF-16) in Philippine Navy service. Like its sister ship, it was retrofitted and modified in the US, replacing systems removed by the USCG. It was expected to arrive in the Philippines by February 2013. However, further training and unspecified upgrades on the ship pushed the arrival of the BRP Ramon Alcaraz to August 2013. The ship's arrival ceremony was held at Subic Harbor on August 6, 2013, led by President Aquino. It was commissioned on November 22, 2013.

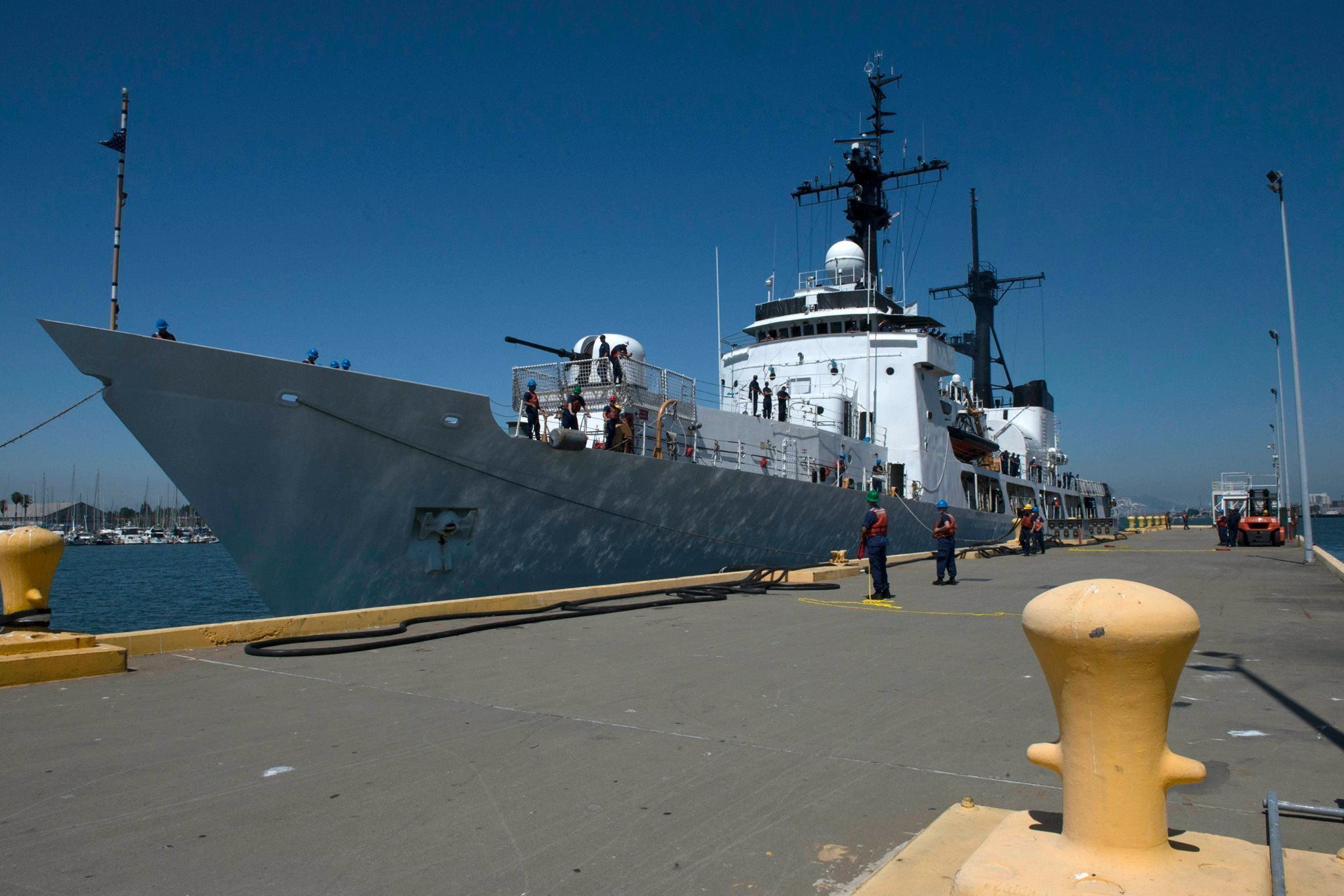
BRP Andres Bonifacio

A third Hamilton-class cutter was turned over to the Philippine Navy after US President Barack Obama announced that another high endurance cutter will be transferred to the Philippines during his visit to the BRP Gregorio del Pilar on November 17, 2015. The White House subsequently confirmed that the USCGC Boutwell (WHEC-719) will be the ship that will be transferred to the Philippines. The ship was commissioned into service on July 21, 2016, and was renamed BRP Andres Bonifacio (FF-17). She was designated as Frigate (FF) upon commissioning, unlike her sister ships, which were designated Patrol Frigate (PF). This was because BRP Andrés Bonifacio entered service after the Philippine Navy made changes to their ship classification.

The ships were re-designated as Patrol Ships (PS) in 2019 to better reflect their limited capabilities.

== Design ==
=== Accommodations ===
The ships were designed with a high level of habitability and provide fairly comfortable accommodations, including air conditioning.

=== Propulsion ===
The Del Pilar class are the first Philippine military vessels to employ the now common shipboard application of aircraft gas turbine jet engines with the use of controllable pitch propellers. The class are equipped with two 18,000 horsepower (13,000 kW) Pratt & Whitney gas turbines and can propel the ship at speeds up to 29 knots (54 km/h; 33 mph). The class also has two 3,500 horsepower (2,600 kW) Fairbanks-Morse diesel engines, capable of driving the ship economically at 12 knots (22 km/h; 14 mph) for up to 12,500 nmi (23,200 km; 14,400 mi) without refueling. A retractable/rotatable bow propulsion unit provides manoeuvrability in tight situations.

=== Armaments ===
Prior to turn-over to the Philippine Navy, the Hamilton-class cutters were armed with a Mk 75 Oto Melara 76 mm Compact main gun, two Mk 38 M242 Bushmaster 25mm chain gun at midships, and a Phalanx CIWS system aft. The CIWS and chain guns were removed by the United States Coast Guard prior to turn-over, with the Mk 75 gun remaining.

The Philippine Navy installed a Mk 38 Mod 1 25 mm chain gun and two Mk 16 20 mm Oerlikon autocannons to the PS-15, and six .50-caliber machine guns on both the PS-15 and PS-16.

The Philippines ordered two new Mk 38 Mod 2 25 mm chain gun systems in 2012, and these are expected to be installed to the ships of the class. On February 17, 2014, it was reported that said chain guns were in the Philippines, waiting for the U.S. Coast Guard armament team for installation. As of January 25, 2015, 2 Mk. 38 Mod. 2 25mm guns had been installed on PF-16.

Another set of Mk 38 systems, this time in Mod 3 variant were ordered in October 2015, and another contract for 2 units of Mk 38 Mod 3 25mm chain guns were ordered in September 2016. The first set of 2 units was installed on BRP Gregorio del Pilar (PS-15) on early June 2019.

=== Flight support ===
The Del Pilar class has a flight deck and hangar capable of handling helicopters. A BO-105 light surveillance helicopter was initially assigned to BRP Gregorio del Pilar, and was replaced by the newer AW109E Power helicopter. The helicopters first made their shipboard deployment on May 21, 2014.

=== Modernization ===
It was also reported that the Philippine Navy is planning further upgrades for the entire ship class. The upgrades will feature upgrades for navigation, propulsion, communication, surveillance, and weapons systems.

In August 2019, the Department of National Defense (DND) signed a deal with Hanwha Systems Co., Ltd. to supply and install the Naval Shield Baseline 2 Integrated Combat Management System (CMS), a Hull Mounted Sonar (HMS), and a Radar Electronic Support Measure (R-ESM). The project contract also covers system integration of Hanwha-supplied equipment with Government-supplied equipment (through US Foreign Military Sales (FMS) and Foreign Military Financing (FMF) ), which includes the AN/SPS-77 Sea Giraffe AMB 3D air/surface search radar, a new Identification Friend or Foe (IFF), the SeaFLIR 230 electro-optical/infra-red (EO/IR) system, and two (2) Mk 38 25mm guns. The contract also include integration of Hanwha-supplied equipment with the existing ship subsystems including navigation, situational awareness, AIS, weapons and guns, countermeasures, and other systems.

On February 21, 2020, Rear Adm. Giovanni Carlo Bacordo stated that additional weapons systems were planned to be installed to complement the ships' upgraded sensors. He suggested that anti-submarine weapons might be installed to complement the sonars to be installed on the class.

On October 14, 2020, Navy chief Giovanni Carlo Bacordo revealed the completion of the 3D modeling program for the class' cabling systems to be used for their electronic upgrades (CMS + 4 sensors), indicating the project is at least running despite the CoVid-19 pandemic.

On July 27, 2023, it was announced by ELAC SONAR GmbH that the Hunter hull-mounted sonar had completed sea acceptance with Hanwha Systems and the Philippine Navy. It was stated that the system would be integrated with Hanwha's combat management system and that sonars would be installed on two additional ships within the following 12 months.

== Ships in class ==
| Ship name | Hull number | Launched | Commissioned | Service | Status |
|---|---|---|---|---|---|
| BRP Gregorio del Pilar | PS-40 | December 18, 1965 | December 14, 2011 | Offshore Combat Force | Active |
| BRP Ramon Alcaraz | PS-41 | October 1, 1966 | November 22, 2013 | Offshore Combat Force | Active |
| BRP Andres Bonifacio | PS-42 | June 17, 1967 | July 21, 2016 | Offshore Combat Force | Active |

== See also ==
- List of naval ship classes in service
- List of equipment of the Philippine Navy
