= Mark 38 machine gun system =

Short-range shipboard weapon system

Mark 38 25 mm machine gun system
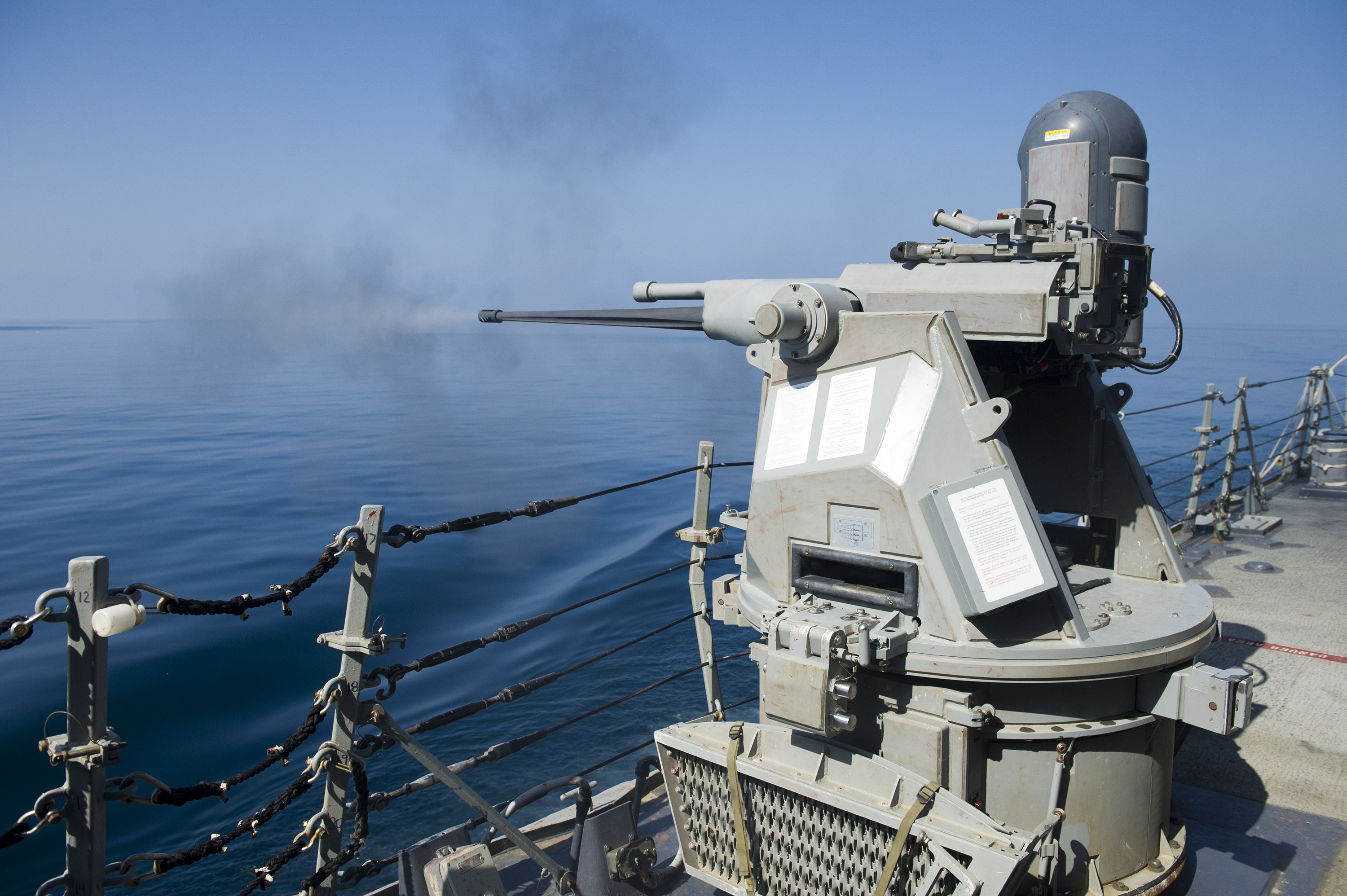
- USS Gonzalez fires her starboard-side Mk 38 Mod 2.
- Type: Naval gun turret with remote and/or manual control
- Place of origin: United States

Service history
- In service: 1986–present
- Used by: See operators

Production history
- Designer: Crane Division, Naval Surface Warfare Center (Mods 0–1); BAE Systems (Mods 2–3); MSI-Defence (Mod 4)
- Variants: 5 (Mods 0–4)

Specifications
- Mass: Gun: 109 kg (240 lb); Turret: 1,042 kg (2,297 lb) unloaded
- Crew: 1 for operation (manual or remote control); 2 for maintenance
- Shell: 25 × 137 mm
- Caliber: 25 mm (1 inch)
- Elevation: -15° to +55°
- Traverse: +/-15° to +/-165°
- Rate of fire: Semi, burst, or auto (up to 180 rpm (3 rps))
- Muzzle velocity: APDS, APDS-T: 1,345 metres per second (4,410 ft/s); HEI, HEI-T: 1,100 metres per second (3,600 ft/s)
- Effective firing range: 2,500 meters (8,200 feet)
- Maximum firing range: 6,800 meters (22,300 feet)
- Guidance system: Mods 0–1: Manually controlled; Mods 2–3: Remotely operated with EO/IR sight, laser rangefinder, and auto-tracking; can also be manually controlled

The Mark 38 25 mm machine gun system (MGS) is a shipboard weapon system designed to protect warships primarily from a variety of surface threats, especially small, fast surface craft. It consists of an M242 Bushmaster chain gun mounted on a turret that can be either manually or remote controlled, depending on variant. Originally designed by the United States in the 1980s for use on their warships, the Mark 38 is today in service on warships of various NATO countries.

== Description ==
The Mark 38 25 mm MGS provides ships with short-range capability against high-speed maneuvering surface targets (HSMSTs), floating mines, and enemy swimmers. Ships close to land can use the system against enemy personnel and lightly armored vehicles. It is a low-cost weapon that can operate in any weather condition, day or night. The Mk 38 MGS can be permanently or temporarily installed on warships for their deployment requirements.

The initial variants of the Mark 38, Mods 0 and 1, were unstabilized and required one crewmember to manually operate. The latest Mods 2 and 3 feature stabilization and remote control ability. All variants of the Mk 38 require two crewmembers for conducting maintenance (e.g., replacing the Bushmaster in the event it malfunctions, which takes five minutes).

=== Components ===
==== M242 Bushmaster ====
The primary component of the Mk 38 is the 25 mm M242 Bushmaster. It is an externally-powered, chain-driven gun. The Bushmaster uses an electric motor to drive the moving parts for ammunition feeding, loading, firing, extraction, and cartridge ejection. The mass of the M242 on the Mark 38 MGS is 109 kg (240 lb).

The Mk 38's Bushmaster can fire all U.S. Navy-approved 25 mm ammunition, including:

- APDS – armour-piercing discarding sabot
- APDS-T – armor-piercing discarding sabot with tracer
- HEI – high-explosive incendiary
- HEI-T – high-explosive incendiary with tracer and self-destruct
- SAPHEI – semi-armor-piercing high-explosive incendiary
- SAPHEI-T – semi-armor-piercing high-explosive incendiary with tracer
- FAPDS-T – frangible armor-piercing discarding sabot with tracer

It has a single-shot semi-automatic mode, for single shots; a burst mode, for a few shots at a time; a low-rate fully automatic (LRFA) mode, for a rate of fire (ROF) of about 100 rounds per minute (RPM); and a high-rate fully automatic (HRFA) mode, for a maximum ROF of about 200 RPM. The Mk 38 MGS can realistically sustain about 180 RPM while on HRFA. The weapon's muzzle velocity is 1,345 m/s (4,410 ft/s) for armor-piercing ammunition or 1,100 m/s (3,600 ft/s) for high-explosive ammunition. The M242's maximum firing range is 6,800 meters (7,400 yards), with an effective firing range of about 3,000 meters (3,300 yards). However, the Mk 38 has an estimated effective firing range of about 2,500 meters (2,700 yards).

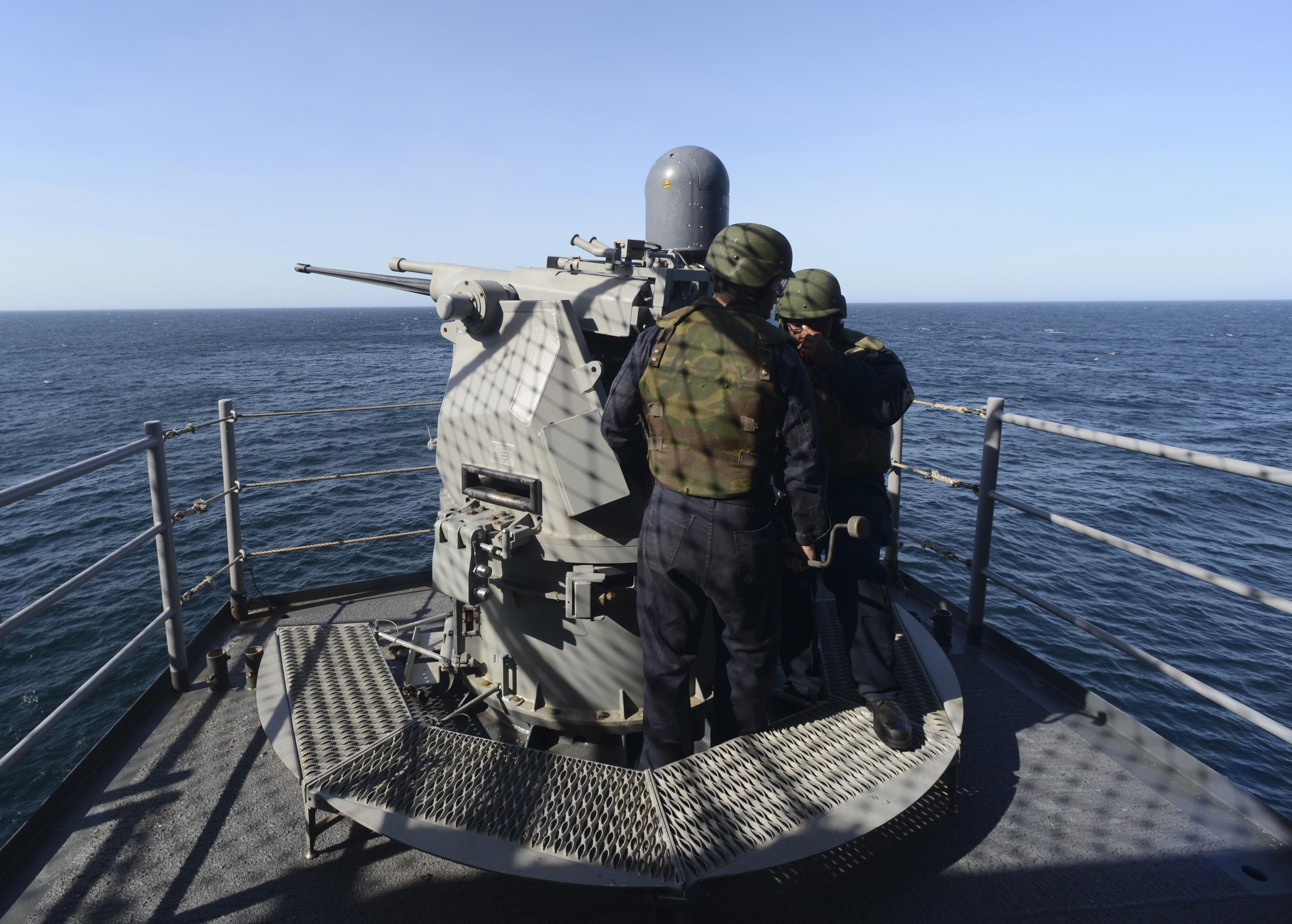
Maintenance is performed on a Mk 38 Mod 2 aboard USS Bataan

==== Machine gun mounting (MGM) ====
Different machine gun mountings are used, depending on the variant of the Mark 38. All MGMs share the same traverse of +/−15 to +/−165 degrees and enable the M242 Bushmaster to elevate from −15 to +55 degrees. The inability to elevate higher than 55 degrees limits the Mark 38 MGS in the anti-aircraft role.

Mark 38 Mods 0 and 1 use the Mark 88 machine gun mounting. It was manually trained—requiring a crewmember to physically operate—and lacked stabilization, both of which reduced targeting effectiveness.

A few Mark 38 machine gun systems use the Mark 96 Mod 0 machine gun mounting. This MGM features both an M242 Bushmaster and a 40 mm Mark 19 grenade launcher. It also has stabilization—it automatically moves to compensate for pitch and roll of the ship. However, like on Mk 38 Mods 0 and 1, this mounting required someone to physically operate.

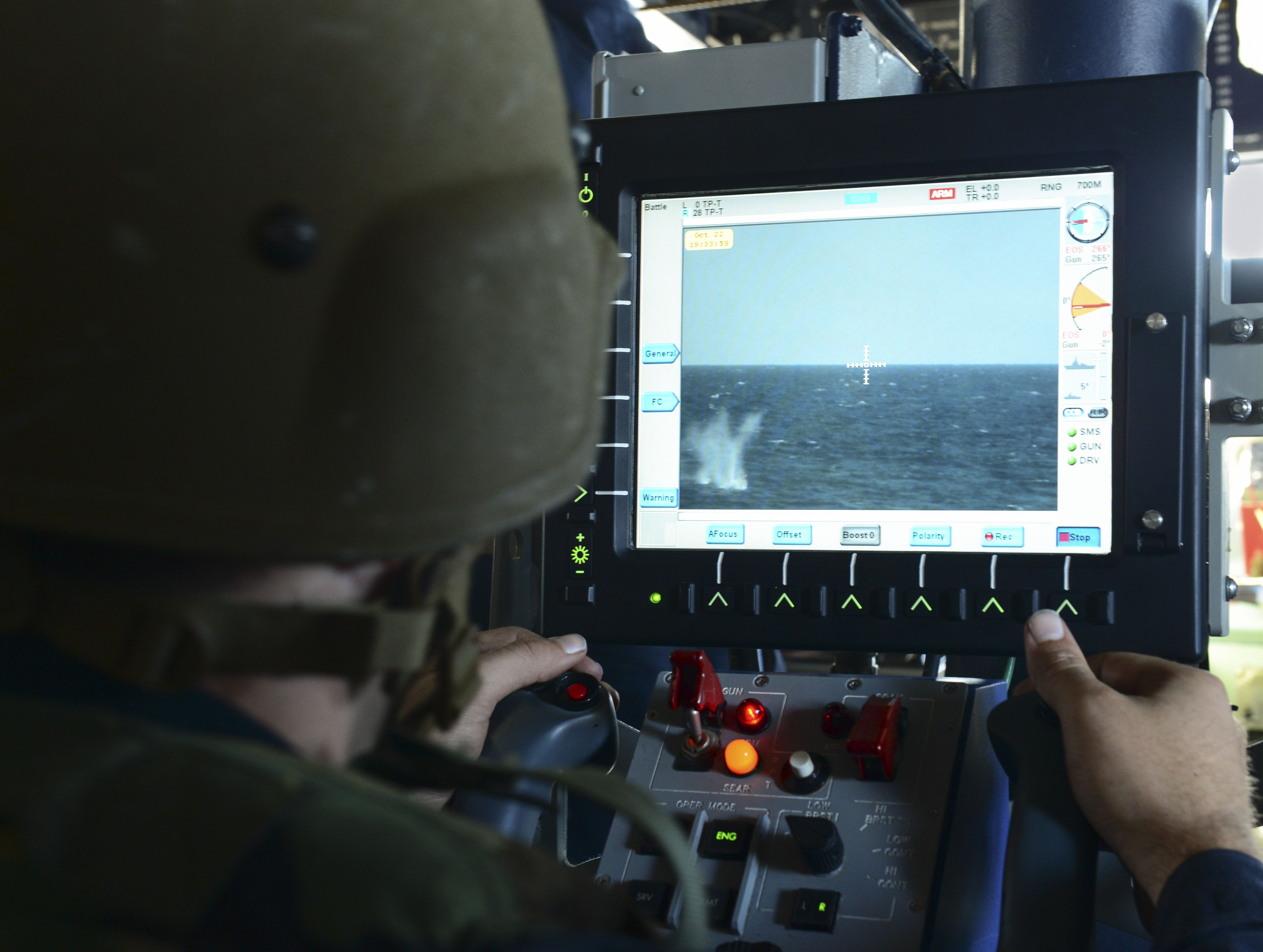
Remote operation of a Mk 38 Mod 2 aboard USS Sterett (DDG-104)

As a result, the Navy developed an improved version MGM for use on the next variant of the Mk 38 MGS. The Mk 38 Mod 2 mounting, also known as the Typhoon Weapon System, features remote control capability, meaning that the operator can safely control the system from within the ship's Combat information center. Two different ammunition types can be loaded into the system, and the operator can select which one to use from their console. Other changes include a new electro-optical/infrared (EO/IR) sight, laser rangefinder, improved man/machine interfaces, and auto-tracking capability. Tests demonstrated that the Mod 2 mounting has a three times greater probability of hit versus previous variants.

The latest Mk 38 Mod 3 mounting has further upgraded interfaces and control consoles. The EO/IR sensor and laser rangefinder, integrated with the system's fire-control system, provide a 330-degree view, "even in extremely low light conditions". The surveillance system can move independently of the turret itself, intended to minimize attention drawn from targets. In addition to the 25 mm M242 Bushmaster, the Mod 3 can optionally mount a coaxial 7.62 mm Bushmaster Mark 52 chain gun, which has a ROF of 500–600 RPM.

== Variants ==
Mod	Mounting	Notes
Mark 38 MGS Mod 0	Mark 88	Initial variant, not mass-produced; Unstabilized; Requires a user to physically operate
Mark 38 MGS Mod 1	Mark 88	First mass-produced variant
N/A	Mark 96 Mod 0	Only variant to feature a Mk 19 grenade launcher; Stabilization: compensates for ship's pitch/roll
Mark 38 MGS Mod 2	Mark 38 Mod 2	Also known as the Typhoon Weapon System; Remote control capability; Electro-optical/infrared (EO/IR) sight; Laser rangefinder; Fully stabilized; Improved ammunition loading; Improved interfaces
Mark 38 MGS Mod 3	Mark 38 Mod 3	Independently-moving surveillance system; Improved fire-control; Improved multi-function display; New control console; Option to mount coaxial 7.62 mm chain gun
Mark 38 MGS Mod 4	Mark 38 Mod 4	Option to mount coaxial 0.50-cal M2HB heavy machine gun; Revised power system

== History ==
In 1977, the U.S. Chief of Naval Operations (CNO) decided that the Oerlikon 20 mm Mk 16 guns would need to be replaced. They had high maintenance demands and did not use standard NATO ammunition; they had become obsolete. In the 1970s, Hughes Helicopters had developed the new 25 mm M242 Bushmaster chain gun for the Army, which the Navy chose to adopt for their new weapon, the Mark 38 25 mm Machine Gun System.

The Crane Division of the Naval Surface Warfare Center was responsible for designing and manufacturing the Mark 88 mounting. In 1986, the Mark 38 MGS Mod 0 was introduced. The Navy did not evaluate the weapon for operational use until the summer of 1987, and the Mark 38 Mod 1 went into service in 1988. With the imminent Persian Gulf War, production of the Mod 1 was accelerated.

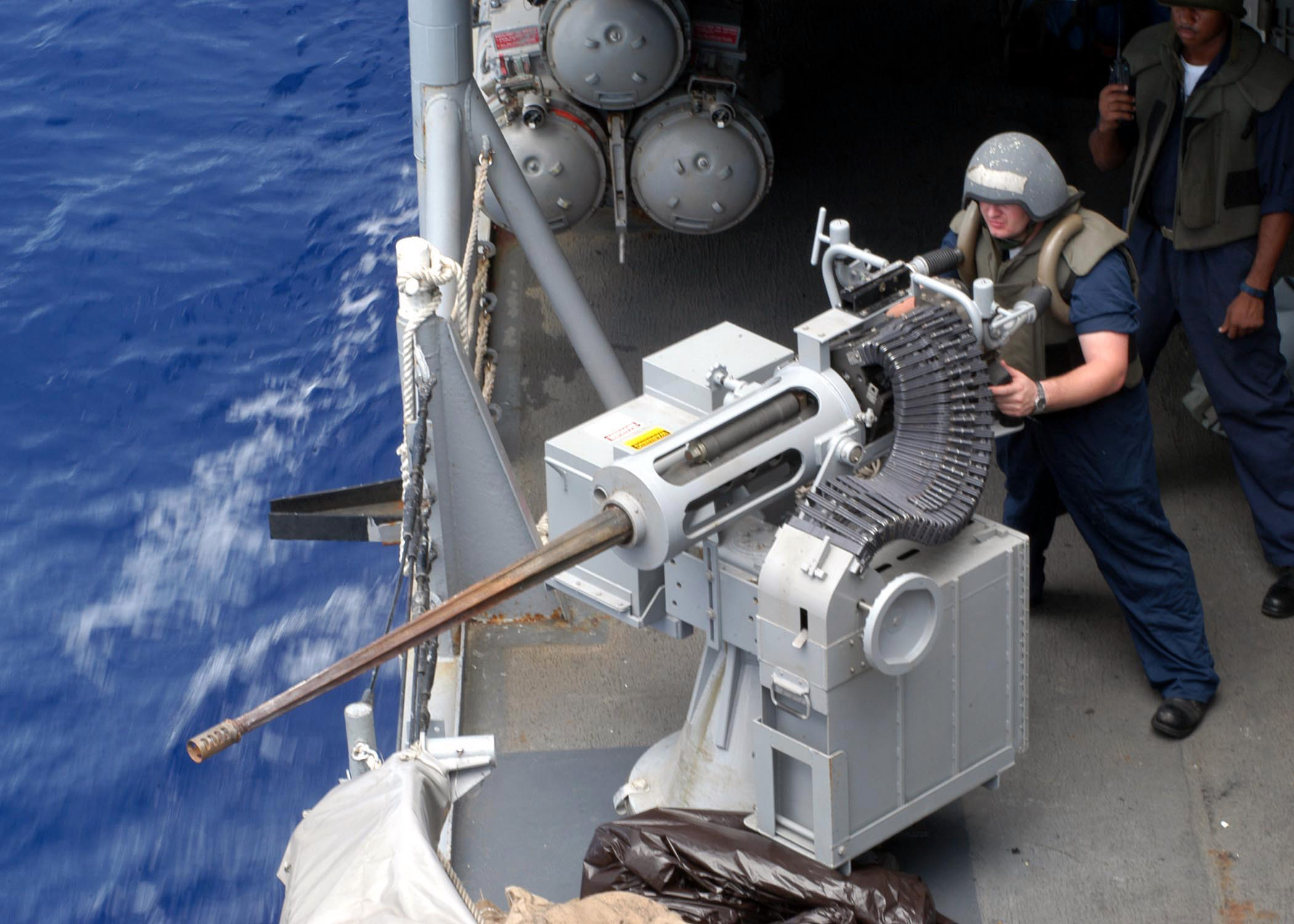
A Mk 38 Mod 1 being operated aboard USS Ingraham

The Mk 38 saw its first use aboard warships and auxiliaries deployed to the Middle East in support of Operations Desert Shield and Desert Storm. The Mod 1s were frequently installed only for temporary durations aboard vessels, rotated among ships based on mission priorities. Between FY1986 and FY1992, the USN purchased 243 Mark 38 25 mm Machine Gun Systems.

In October 2000, USS Cole was bombed in an attack by a small boat. The incident led to the recognition of an upgraded Mk 38 MGS as a means to improve shipboard protection against the threat of small surface craft. In 2003, the CNO coordinated the development and procurement of the Mark 38 Mod 2. On June 8, 2004, United Defense (acquired by BAE Systems) received a $395.5 million contract to produce the Mod 2.

In March 2011, the U.S. Navy awarded a contract to BAE Systems to develop a variant of the Mod 2 with a directed energy system, referred to as the Mk 38 Mod 2 Tactical Laser System. By July, it was announced that BAE was teaming with Boeing on the project. Boeing is supplying the laser components for the system. The Mk 38 Mod 2 TLS is intended to be able to hit both surface and air targets like UAVs. The original demonstrator called for a 10 kW laser, but after the USN indicated interest in a more powerful weapon, by 2017 the proposed laser had been upscaled to 60 kW.

In July 2012, the Mark 38 MGS program was further expanded, resulting in the Mark 38 Mod 3, the latest variant of the system. The Mod 3 is currently being fielded by BAE under a separate program from the TLS program.

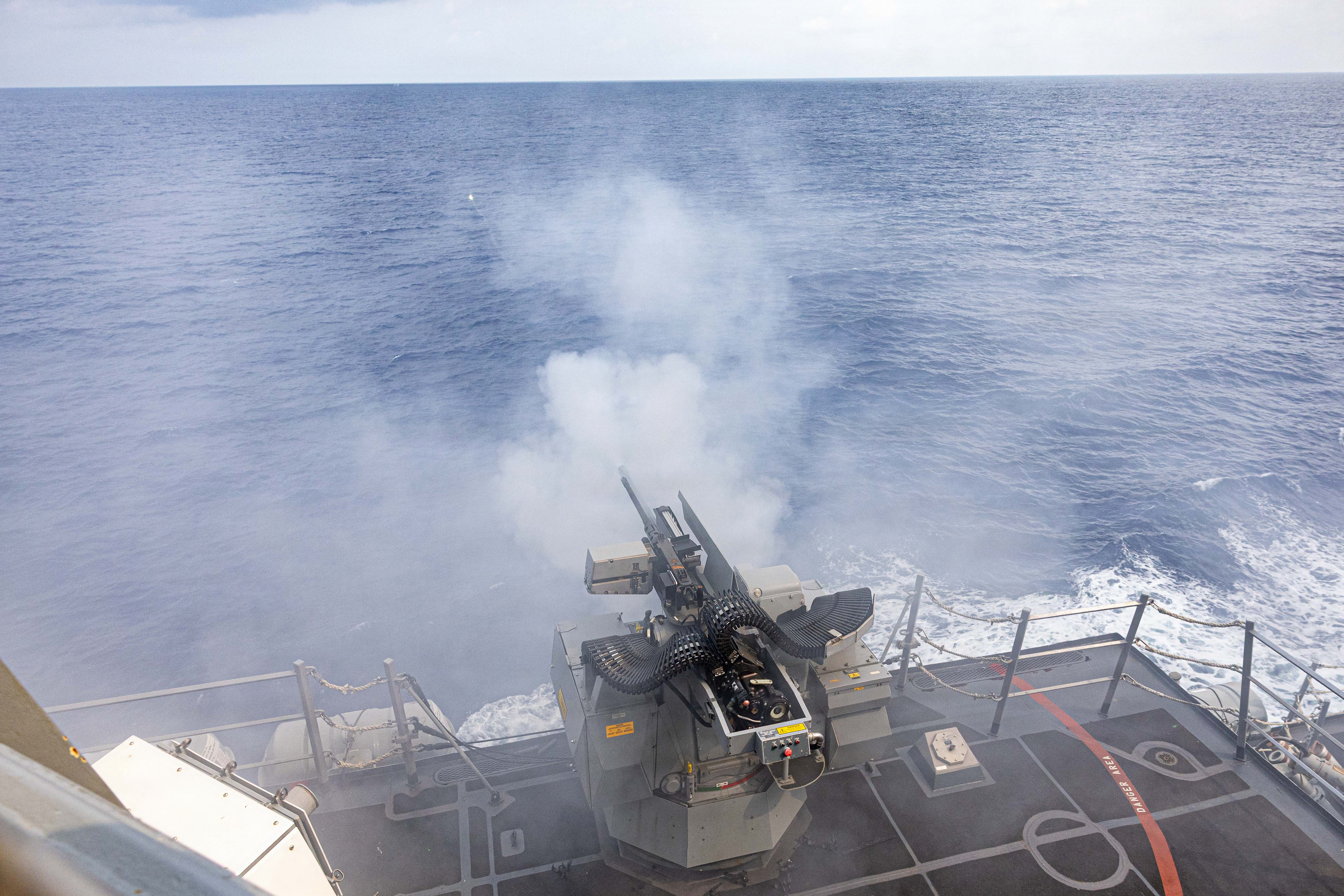
A Mk 38 Mod 4 being fired aboard USS Mustin (DDG-89)

In FY2019, a Maritime Accelerated Acquisition program was started to procure the Mod 4 variant of the Mark 38. The program was created to address "unmanned aerial systems (UAS) and high speed maneuverable unmanned surface vehicle (USV) threats". Mod 4 will incorporate the 30 mm Mk44 Bushmaster II instead of the 25 mm M242 Bushmaster of previous variants. This is intended to improve accuracy, increase lethality, and increase effective range. In 2021, MSI-Defence begun delivery of its Seahawk DS30M A2 30 mm gun mount to the USN for testing and qualification for the Mod 4. The Mk 38 Mod 4 will achieve initial operating capability on Arleigh Burke-class destroyers with Aegis Baseline 9 in FY2022. The USCG also intends to acquire the Mk 38 Mod 4 for installation on its future Polar Security Cutters.

The USS Mustin is the first Arleigh Burke-class destroyer to receive the Mk 38 Mod 4 and conducted a live fire exercise in the South China Sea on April 17, 2026.

== Operators ==
Country	Organization(s)	Platforms
Australia	Royal Australian Navy	Armidale-class patrol boat, Canberra-class landing helicopter dock, Hobart-class destroyer
Canada	Royal Canadian Navy	Harry DeWolf-class offshore patrol vessel
Georgia	Coast Guard of Georgia	Island-class patrol boat
Philippines	Philippine Navy	Del Pilar-class offshore patrol vessel, Jacinto-class patrol vessel, Mariano Alvarez-class coastal patrol vessel, Jose Andrada-class patrol craft
Singapore	Republic of Singapore Navy	Endurance-class landing platform dock, Formidable-class frigate
Spain	Spanish Navy	Meteoro-class offshore patrol vessel
Sri Lanka	Sri Lanka Navy	Hamilton-class cutter, Reliance-class cutter
United States	United States Navy	America-class amphibious assault ship, Arleigh Burke-class destroyer, Blue Ridge-class command ship, Emory S. Land-class submarine tender, Harpers Ferry-class dock landing ship, Gerald R. Ford-class aircraft carrier, Mark VI patrol boat, Nimitz-class aircraft carrier, Ticonderoga-class cruiser, Wasp-class amphibious assault ship, Whidbey Island-class dock landing ship
United States	United States Coast Guard	Heritage-class cutter, Reliance-class cutter, Sentinel-class cutter
Ukraine	Ukrainian Navy	Island-class patrol boat

The Mk 38 MGS is also used on offshore support vessels.

== See also ==
- Typhoon Weapon Station
- 30mm DS30M Mark 2 Automated Small Calibre Gun
