= BRP Gregorio del Pilar (PS-40) =

Philippine warship

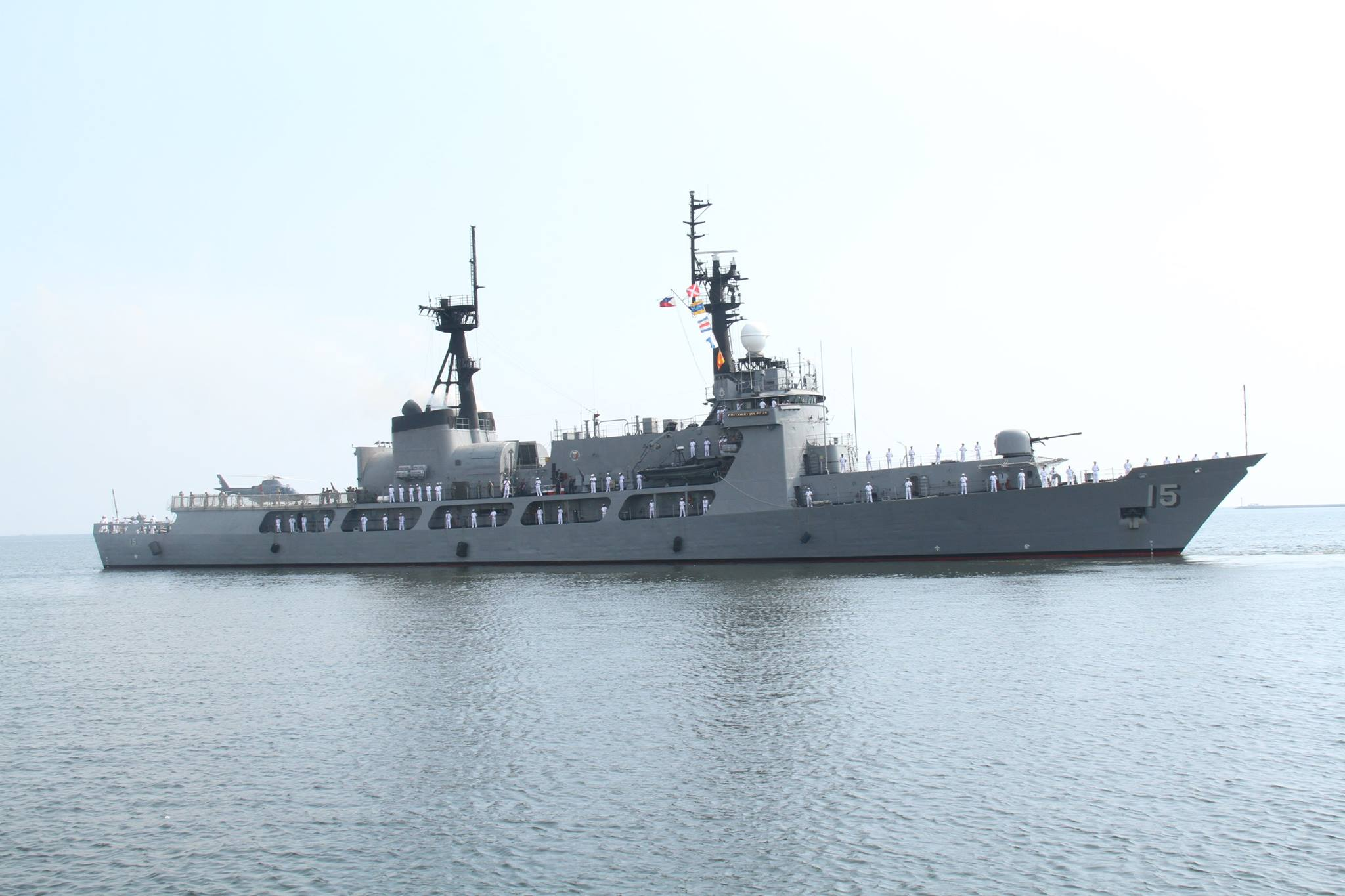
- BRP Gregorio del Pilar (PS-40, then PS-15)

History

United States
- Name: USCGC Hamilton
- Builder: Avondale Shipyards
- Launched: December 18, 1965
- Commissioned: March 18, 1967
- Decommissioned: March 28, 2011
- Identification: WHEC-715
- Fate: Transferred to Philippine Navy
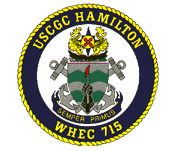
- Badge

Philippines
- Name: BRP Gregorio del Pilar
- Namesake: Gregorio Hilario del Pilar y Sempio
- Acquired: May 13, 2011
- Commissioned: December 14, 2011
- Maiden voyage: July 18, 2011
- Home port: Subic Bay Freeport Zone
- Identification: Pennant number: PS-40 (2026 - present), PS-15 (2019-2026), FF-15 (2011-2019); MMSI number: 265902190
- Nickname(s): BRP Goyo
- Status: In active service
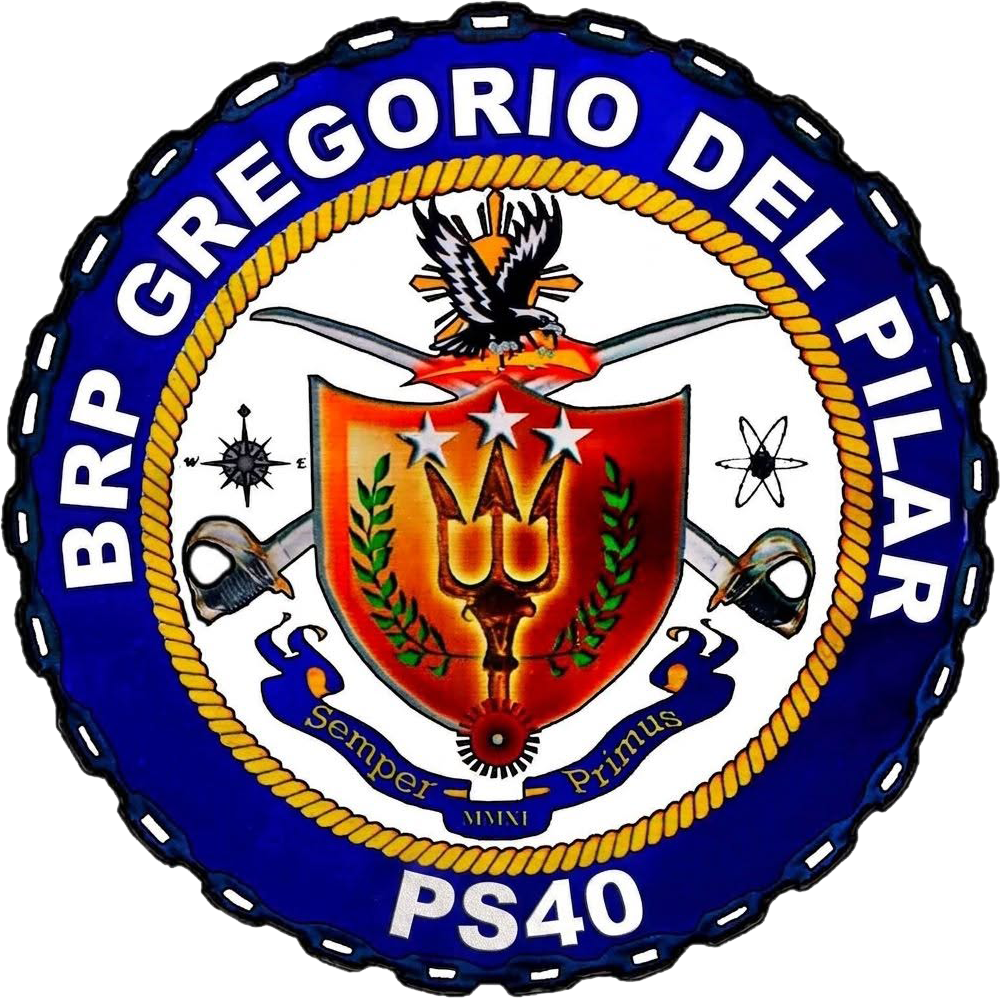
- Badge

General characteristics
- Class & type: Gregorio del Pilar-class offshore patrol vessel
- Displacement: 3,250 tons
- Length: 378 ft (115.2 m)
- Beam: 43 ft (13.1 m)
- Draft: 15 ft (4.6 m)
- Propulsion: Combined diesel or gas (CODOG) arrangement: 2 × Fairbanks-Morse 38TD8-1/8-12 12-cylinder diesel engines, each producing 3,500 shp (2,610 kW); 2 × Pratt & Whittney FT4A-6 gas turbines, each producing 18,000 shp (13,400 kW)
- Speed: 29 knots (54 km/h; 33 mph) via twin gas-turbines
- Range: 12,500 nmi (23,200 km; 14,400 mi) @ 12 knots (22 km/h; 14 mph) via diesel
- Endurance: 45 days
- Boats & landing craft carried: 2 × RHIB
- Complement: 85
- Sensors & processing systems: Combat System: NavalShield Baseline 2 iCMS by Hanwha Systems; Coast Watch System Shipboard Command and Control Suite (CWS-SCCS) by Global Technical Systems (GTS); Search radar: Saab AB AN/SPS-77 Sea Giraffe AMB 3D air/surface search radar; Secondary radars: Kelvin Hughes MK2 25KW X-band navigational radar Kelvin Hughes Sharpeye 200W S-band solid state navigation/surface search radar; Fire Control System: Sperry Mk 92 Mod 1 Fire Control System; Optronic Sensors: SeaFLIR230 color TV camera, low-light camera, thermal imager, LRF, laser pointer, NVIS; Sonar: ELAC Hunter 2.0 underkeel sonar
- Electronic warfare & decoys: 2 × Mark 36 SRBOC (Super Rapid Blooming Offboard Countermeasures) mortar-type Launching System by BAE Systems; RESM:
- Armament: 1 × Mk.75 OTO-Melara 76/62C Compact 76mm L/62 DP autocannon; 2 × Mk 38 Mod 3 25mm autocannon RCWS by BAE Systems (port & starboard); 6 × M2HB Browning .50 cal guns
- Armor: CBRNE defense system
- Aircraft carried: 1 × AW109E Power naval helicopter
- Aviation facilities: flight deck; hangar: partly-fixed partly-retractable
- Notes: steel hull, aluminium superstructure

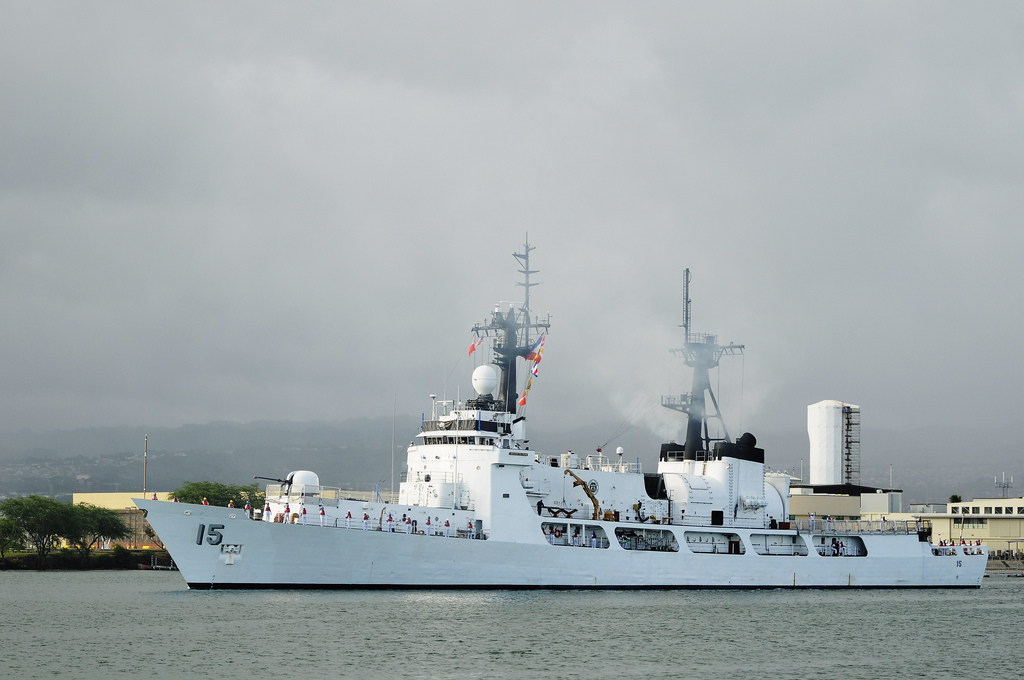
BRP Gregorio del Pilar (PF-15), arrives at Joint Base Pearl Harbor–Hickam during a scheduled port visit. (July 2011)

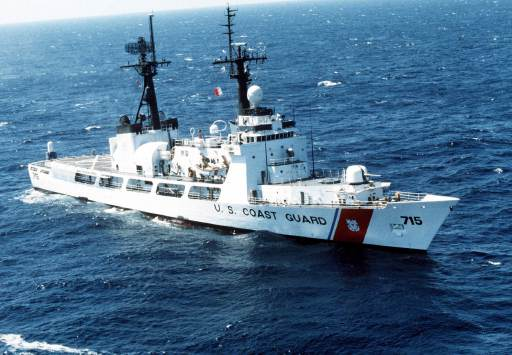
USCGC Hamilton (WHEC-715)

BRP Gregorio del Pilar (PS-40) is the lead ship of her class of offshore patrol vessel of the Philippine Navy. She is the second ship to be named after Gregorio del Pilar, a Filipino revolutionary general known for his role at the Battle of Tirad Pass. She was originally designated as "PF-15" from 2012 to mid-2016. Then the Navy adopted a new code designation system and she was redesignated as "FF-15". In February 2019, the Navy downgraded the status of the entire class from frigate to patrol ship and redesignated her as "PS-15". The ship, together with its two other sisterships, were again re-designated in March 2026, with BRP Gregorio del Pilar given the hull number PS-40.

From 1967 to 2011, the ship was a Hamilton-class high endurance cutter of the United States Coast Guard, known as USCGC Hamilton. The United States decommissioned the cutter on 28 March 2011, and she was acquired by the Philippines under the Excess Defense Articles and the Foreign Assistance Act. It is one of three ex-US Coast Guard Hamilton-class cutters that serve in the Philippine Navy.

== Construction and design ==
The ship now known as BRP Gregorio del Pilar (PS-40) was launched on December 18, 1965, at Avondale Shipyards near New Orleans, Louisiana, as USCGC Hamilton (WHEC-715) and was named for Alexander Hamilton the first United States Secretary of the Treasury and founder of the United States Revenue Cutter Service. Hamilton was commissioned March 18, 1967.

The ship is designed with a high level of habitability and provides fairly comfortable accommodations, including air conditioning. Gregorio del Pilar is the first Philippine military vessel to employ the now common shipboard application of aircraft gas turbine jet engines with the use of controllable pitch propellers and is equipped with two 18,000 horsepower (13,000 kW) Pratt & Whitney gas turbines that can propel the ship at speeds up to 29 knots (54 km/h; 33 mph). Gregorio del Pilar also has two 3,500 horsepower (2,600 kW) Fairbanks-Morse diesel engines, capable of driving the ship economically at 12 knots (22 km/h; 14 mph) for up to 12,500 nmi (23,200 km; 14,400 mi) without refuelling. A retractable/rotatable bow propulsion unit provides manoeuvrability in tight situations.

=== Armament ===
The ship was armed with a Mk.75 Oto Melara 76 mm Compact main gun, two Mk.38 M242 Bushmaster 25 mm chain gun at midships, and a Phalanx CIWS system aft. The CIWS and chain guns were removed by the US Coast Guard prior to its turn-over to the Philippine Navy. Only the Mk.75 gun remains.

Plans to install additional weapons were made, which includes one Mk. 38 Mod 1 25 mm chain gun aft, two Mk.16 20 mm autocannons midships, and six 12.7 mm machine guns. These were installed during its scheduled dock works before the commissioning ceremonies. Photos during the commissioning ceremonies confirmed the presence of such weapons.

The Philippines reportedly ordered at least four new Mk.38 Mod 3 25mm naval guns, and these are expected to be installed on all Gregorio del Pilar class ships.

It was also reported that the Philippine Navy will be getting sophisticated a radar system capable of detecting and tracking surface threats, a Harpoon anti-ship missile system, and torpedo decoy systems. This would be purchased from the United States possibly under a government-to-government deal.

=== Flight support ===
The ship has a flight deck and hangar capable of handling helicopters.

A BO-105 light surveillance helicopter was initially assigned to the ship, and was replaced by the AgustaWestland AW109 Power, which made its first official shipboard deployment on May 21, 2014.

=== Modernization ===
The Philippine Navy plans to modernize the entire ship of the class, with an initial program to upgrade the ship's sensors, and another program to improve its weapon systems.

Several systems were acquired through US Foreign Military Sales (FMS) and Foreign Military Financing (FMF), which includes the BAE Systems Mk. 38 Mod. 2 machine gun system, the SAAB AN/SPS-77 Sea Giraffe AMB 3D air/surface search radar, and the FLIR Systems SeaFLIR 230 Electro-Optical/Infra-Red Camera.

Meanwhile, the Philippine Navy will launch a program to acquire, install and integrate several other sensors into the ship, as part of the Horizon 2 phase of the Revised AFP Modernization Program. Among those to be acquired are new Combat Management System (CMS), Hull Mounted Sonar (HMS), and a Radar Electronic Support Measures (R-ESM).

Future upgrades are planned to install defensive and offensive missile systems, as well as torpedo weapon system, although funding is still being secured and might only be included in the next phase of the Navy's modernization program.

In 2020 October 14, Navy chief Giovanni Carlo Bacordo revealed the completion of the 3D modeling program for the entire ship class' cabling systems to be used for their electronic upgrades (CMS + 4 sensors).

== Service history ==
=== United States Coast Guard (1967–2011) ===
In 1988, Hamilton completed a three-year fleet renovation and modernization that provided the ship with modern weapons and electronics systems. All spaces and machinery were also completely overhauled and refurbished. The new technology enables Hamilton to operate seamlessly with the United States Navy.

Hamilton has served a variety of missions with distinction. During a 1969–70 deployment to Vietnam, Hamilton interdicted weapons smugglers and fired more than 4,600 rounds of gunfire in support of U.S. and Vietnamese troops ashore. From 1965 to 1975, Hamilton served on Atlantic Ocean Stations, collecting valuable oceanographic data and conducting frequent search and rescue missions. Hamilton also directed the interdictions of over 21,000 Haitian migrants throughout the Caribbean during Operation Able Manner. In 1994, Hamilton received the Coast Guard Meritorious Unit Commendation for rescuing 135 Haitians from the sea after their sailboat capsized and sank.

In 1996, Hamilton transited the Panama Canal and served as the command and control platform for Operation Frontier Shield, a multi-agency effort to curtail the influx of narcotics into the United States. Hamilton intercepted 14 drug-laden vessels carrying more than 115 tons of contraband worth 200 million dollars.

In 1999, Hamilton seized over 2,700 kilograms (6,000 lb) of cocaine bound for the U.S. in the Eastern Pacific Ocean. Hamilton frequently patrolled the Bering Sea off the Alaskan coast at the Maritime Boundary Line (MBL) which separates the Russian and the United States' Exclusive Economic Zones (EEZ). Hamilton's presence on the MBL deters foreign fishing vessels from fishing in the U.S. EEZ.

In March 2007, Hamilton assisted Sherman in the largest recorded maritime drug bust in history. The two vessels intercepted the Panamanian-flagged fishing vessel Gatun in international waters and were able to recover 20 metric tons of cocaine, with an estimated street value of $600 million retail. The seizure was the largest drug bust in US history and the largest interdiction at sea.

=== Philippine Navy (2011–present) ===
Proposal to decommission USCGC Hamilton from the US Coast Guard was made for fiscal year 2011 budget, and the Philippines sent a formal letter of interest for its purchase. USCGC Hamilton was decommissioned on March 28, 2011, and transferred to the Philippine Navy as an excess defense article under the Foreign Assistance Act. The Philippines sent a team to conduct a thorough inspection of the ship in November 2010.

The US Coast Guard removed some of the ship's equipment before its transfer to the Philippine Navy and plans to use those equipment as spare parts for the other US Coast Guard ships. Among those that were removed are the AN/SPS-40 air surface search radar, Phalanx CIWS, and two Mk.38 M242 Bushmaster 25 mm chain guns. In return, the US Coast Guard began procuring and installing the safe-to-sail navigation equipment, radar systems and additional electronics that the Philippines requested as part of its transfer support case. The Philippine Navy installed a 25 mm chain gun, two 20 mm guns, and six mounted 50-caliber guns as replacement for the equipment removed.

The ship's transfer cost was pegged at Php450 million, while operation costs for two years was estimated at Php120 million. Funding came from Philippines' Department of Energy, considering that the vessel is projected to be deployed to secure oil platform and exploration activities in the Western and Southern Philippines.

Training for the crew started in January 2011, when the US Coast Guard provided 10 weeks of combined dockside and underway training on USCGC Boutwell for the ship's prospective commanding officer, executive officer and crew.

Gregorio del Pilar (PF-15) was formally transferred to the Philippines on May 13, 2011, at the transfer ceremony on Coast Guard Island. Captain Alberto A. Cruz became its first commanding officer.

Its maiden voyage included a port visit to Hawaii and docking at Alameda, California to finish the remaining work, with around 13 separate contracting actions. Gregorio del Pilar conducted a test at the coast of California to measure the crew's capabilities and the ship's seaworthiness. Gregorio del Pilar made a port visit at Joint Base Pearl Harbor–Hickam which was the first time that a Philippine vessel docked at Pearl Harbor. She arrived on the Philippines on August 17, 2011 after port visit in Guam. Gregorio del Pilar arrived in Manila on August 21, 2011. The arrival ceremony was held on August 23, 2011, and minor improvements were done the following days.

BRP Gregorio del Pilar (PF-15) was formally commissioned by the Philippine Navy on December 14, 2011, at Pier 13, Manila South Harbor. President Benigno Aquino III's elder sister, Ballsy Cruz, was the principal sponsor of the ship.

President Aquino hoped that this, his first major military acquisition, would be a symbol of his administration's intention to strengthen and modernize the Philippine Navy and the Armed Forces, and to defend its territory and Exclusive Economic Zone (EEZ) in the South China Sea.

BRP Gregorio del Pilar was involved in a standoff in 2012 at the Scarborough Shoal when it tried to apprehend eight Chinese fishing vessels in the island.

BRP Gregorio del Pilar was also one of the naval vessels that the AFP Western Command sent to help in the searching efforts for Malaysia Airlines Flight 370.

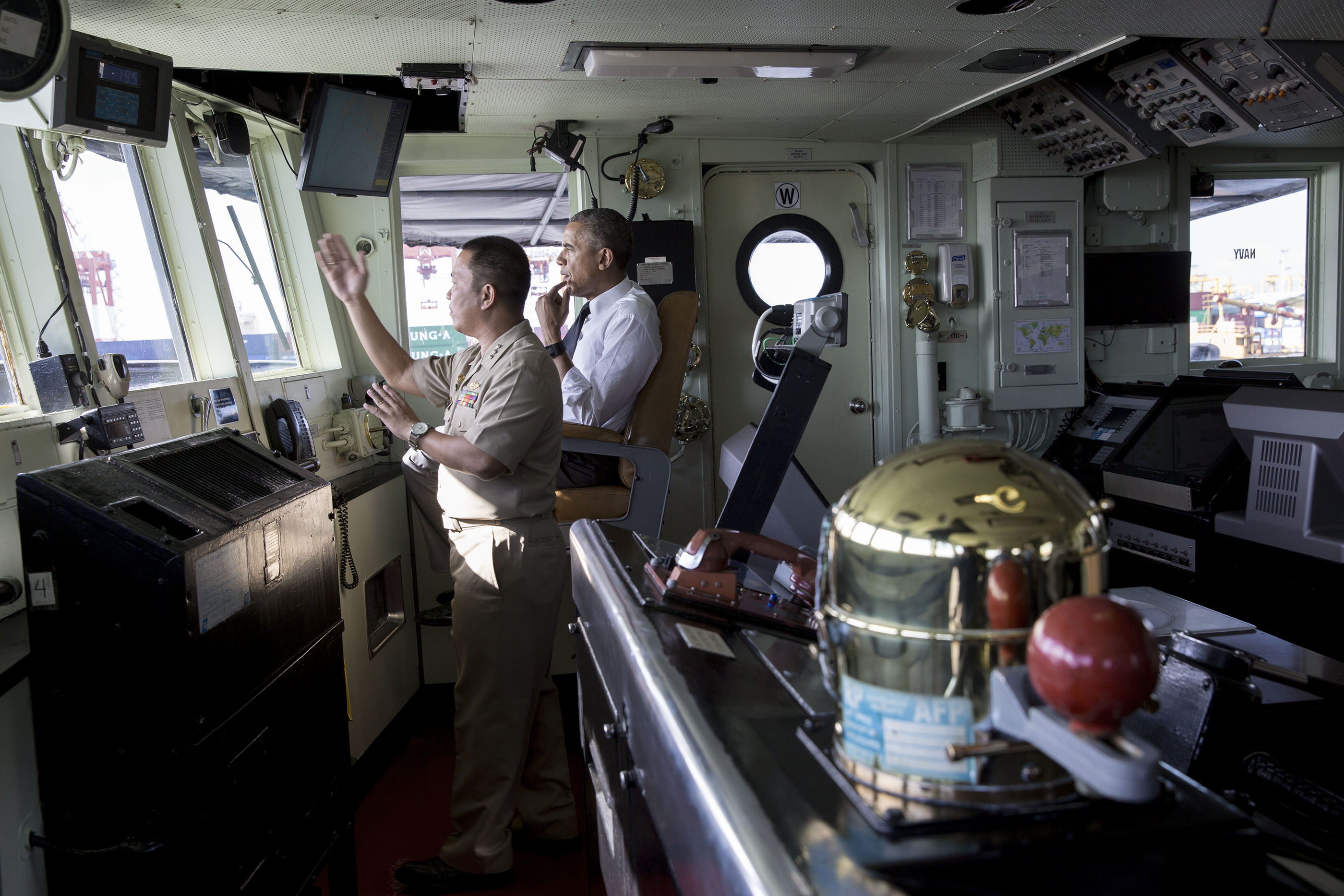
U.S. President Barack Obama aboard the BRP Gregorio del Pilar, November 17, 2015

On November 17, 2015, United States President Barack Obama visited and toured the ship on the sidelines of the APEC Summit to highlight the United States' commitment to assist East Asian countries in maritime security, amidst the territorial disputes in the South China Sea. After touring the ship, he announced that a third Hamilton-class cutter similar to Gregorio del Pilar (USCGC Boutwell (WHEC-719)) and the research vessel RV Melville will be turned over to the Philippine Navy.

Around mid-2016, the Philippine Navy started calling the ship in its new code designation FF-15, together with its sister ship BRP Ramon Alcaraz which was re-designated as FF-16, and the new BRP Andres Bonifacio designated as FF-17.

On August 29, 2018, she ran aground at Half Moon Shoal in the South China Sea off Palawan. She was eventually removed from the shoal on September 3, 2018, and towed to Subic Bay for repairs.

In September 2022, Gregorio Del Pilar completed a four-year repair and overhaul period. It was then announced that the ship will soon deploy to the South China Sea.

On 7 April 2024, Gregorio del Pilar conducted a joint patrol in the South China Sea with BRP Antonio Luna (FF-151), BRP Valentin Diaz (PS-177), USS Mobile (LCS-26) of the US Navy, HMAS Warramunga (FFH 152) of the Royal Australian Navy, and JS Akebono of the Japan Maritime Self-Defense Force. This marked the first multinational patrol among the nations.

The ship was re-designated with a new hull number, PS-40, as of March 2026.

== Notable operational deployments ==
=== Port calls ===
On July 27, 2011, Gregorio del Pilar arrived at Joint Base Pearl Harbor–Hickam for a scheduled port visit. She took on supplies and fuel, and held a reception hosted by the Philippine Consulate in Honolulu and the Philippine Celebrations Coordinating Committee of Hawaii. The crew also visited the USS Arizona Memorial. It also marks the first time a Philippine naval vessel pulled into Pearl Harbor.

=== Search and rescue ===
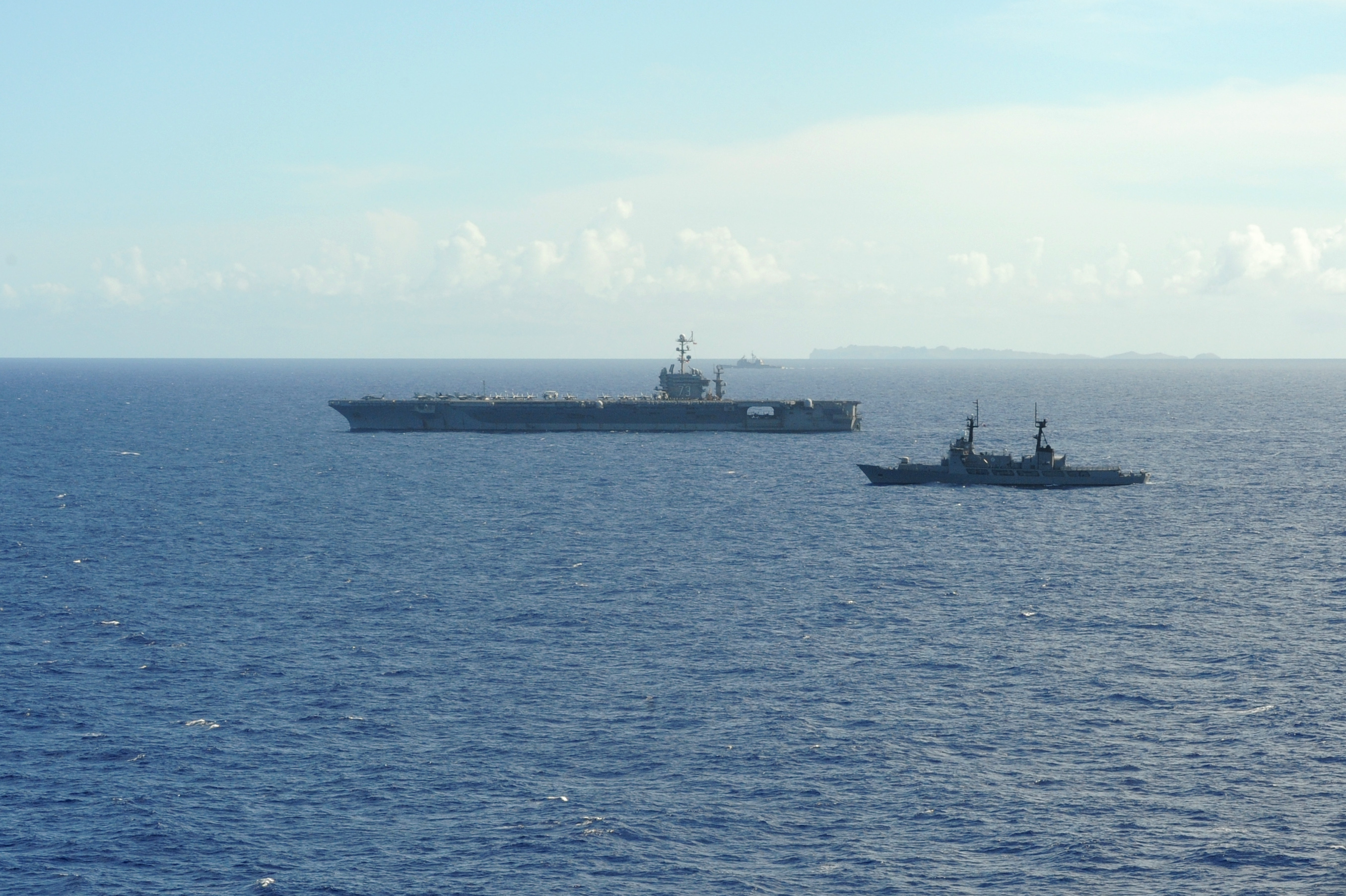
BRP Gregorio del Pilar steams alongside USS George Washington on 17 November 2013 during Operation Damayan after Typhoon Haiyan.

BRP Gregorio Del Pilar was assigned to Naval Forces Western to help in a joint multinational disaster relief and response operations dubbed Operation Damayan after the Visayan Islands were struck by Typhoon Haiyan in November 2013.

On 2014, the ship has been deployed in the search for the missing Malaysia Airlines Flight 370.

=== Exercises ===
On July 30, 2011, Gregorio del Pilar and USS Reuben James conducted a Passing Exercise (PASSEX) off the coast of Hawaii.

On August 22, 2011, the United States Embassy in Manila posted on their Facebook account photos indicating that BRP Gregorio del Pilar had an in-stride training with USS Fitzgerald on their transit to Guam, which may have started around August 4, 2011.

On August 14–16, 2012, the Naval Forces Northern Luzon (NFNL) conducted a small-scale Naval Exercise code-named SAGEX 02–12 at the waters of South China Sea. BRP Gregorio del Pilar together with BRP Rajah Humabon and BRP Liberato Picar participated under Naval Task Force (NTF) 11. The exercise includes patrol, simulated tracking of targets and interdiction and capped by live firing exercises.

Gregorio del Pilar, together with BRP Rajah Humabon participated in the sea phase exercises with the US Navy during the Balikatan 2013 from April 5 to 17, 2013.

The ship conducted an offshore visit at Lingayen, Pangasinan during the city's "Pistay Dayat 2013" ("Feast of the Sea 2013"), with an open house tour and rescue exhibition exercises performed by the crew.

From June 27 to July 2, 2013, Gregorio del Pilar participated in joint naval maneuvers during Cooperation Afloat Readiness and Training 2013 Philippines (CARAT 2013 Philippines) with other Philippine and United States naval and coast guard ships. The at-sea phase was conducted on June 27 off the waters midway from Zambales province and Scarborough Shoal.

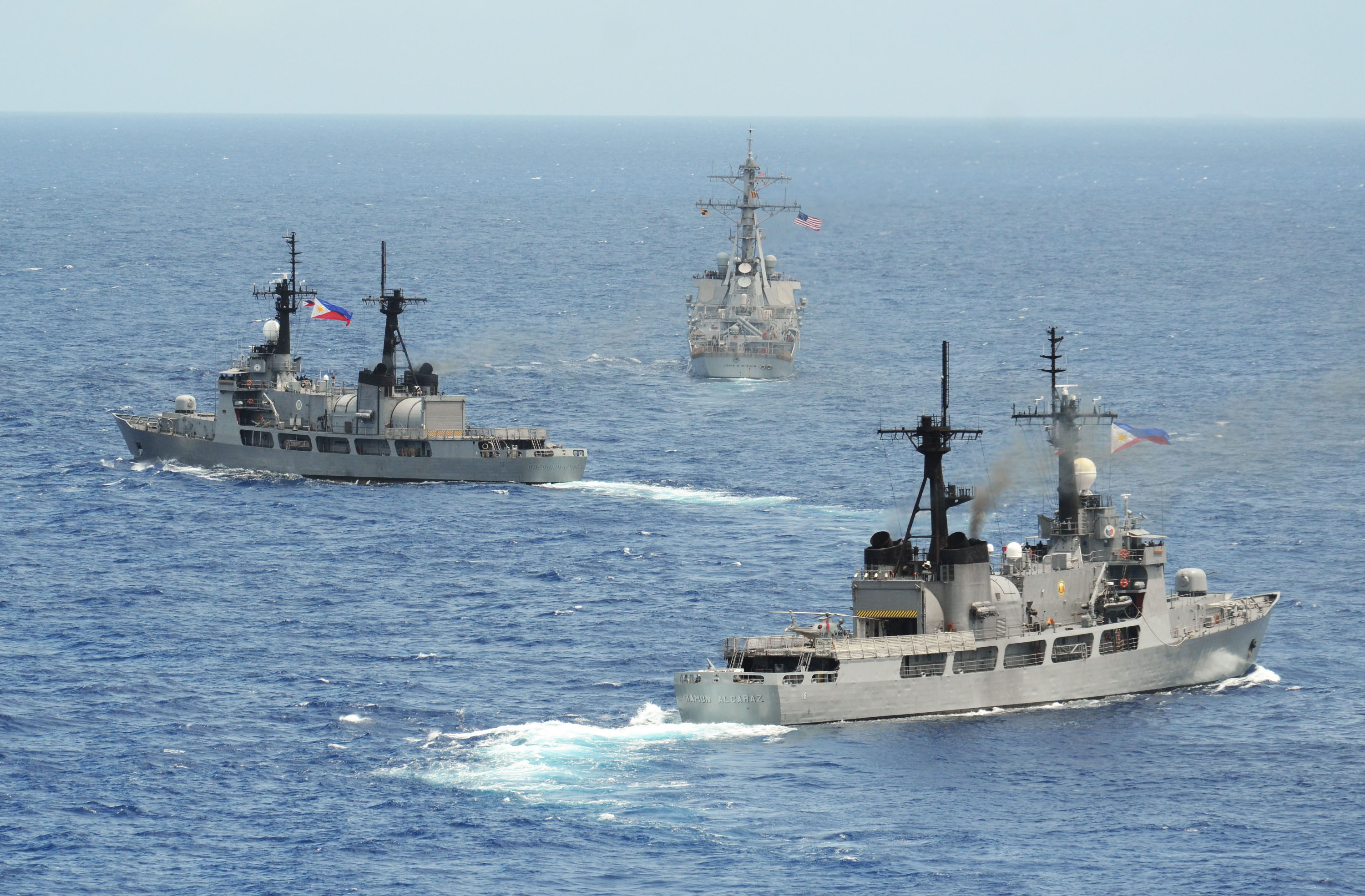
The U.S. Navy destroyer USS John S. McCain, and Philippine Navy Offshore Patrol Vessels BRP Gregaorio del Pilar and BRP Ramon Alcaraz steam in formation during CARAT Philippines 2014.

The ship, together with its sister ship BRP Ramon Alcaraz participated in joint naval maneuvers as part of CARAT 2014 Philippines from June 26 to July 1, 2014. It was scheduled to conduct exercises on gunnery, combined air, surface, anti-submarine operations at sea.

In May 2018, the BRP Gregorio del Pilar participated in the Third Multilateral Naval Exercise Komodo 2018 held from May 8 to 9, 2018 in Lombok, Indonesia.

== See also ==
- List of ships of the Philippine Navy
