= APEC Philippines 2015 =

Asia-Pacific Economic Cooperation meeting

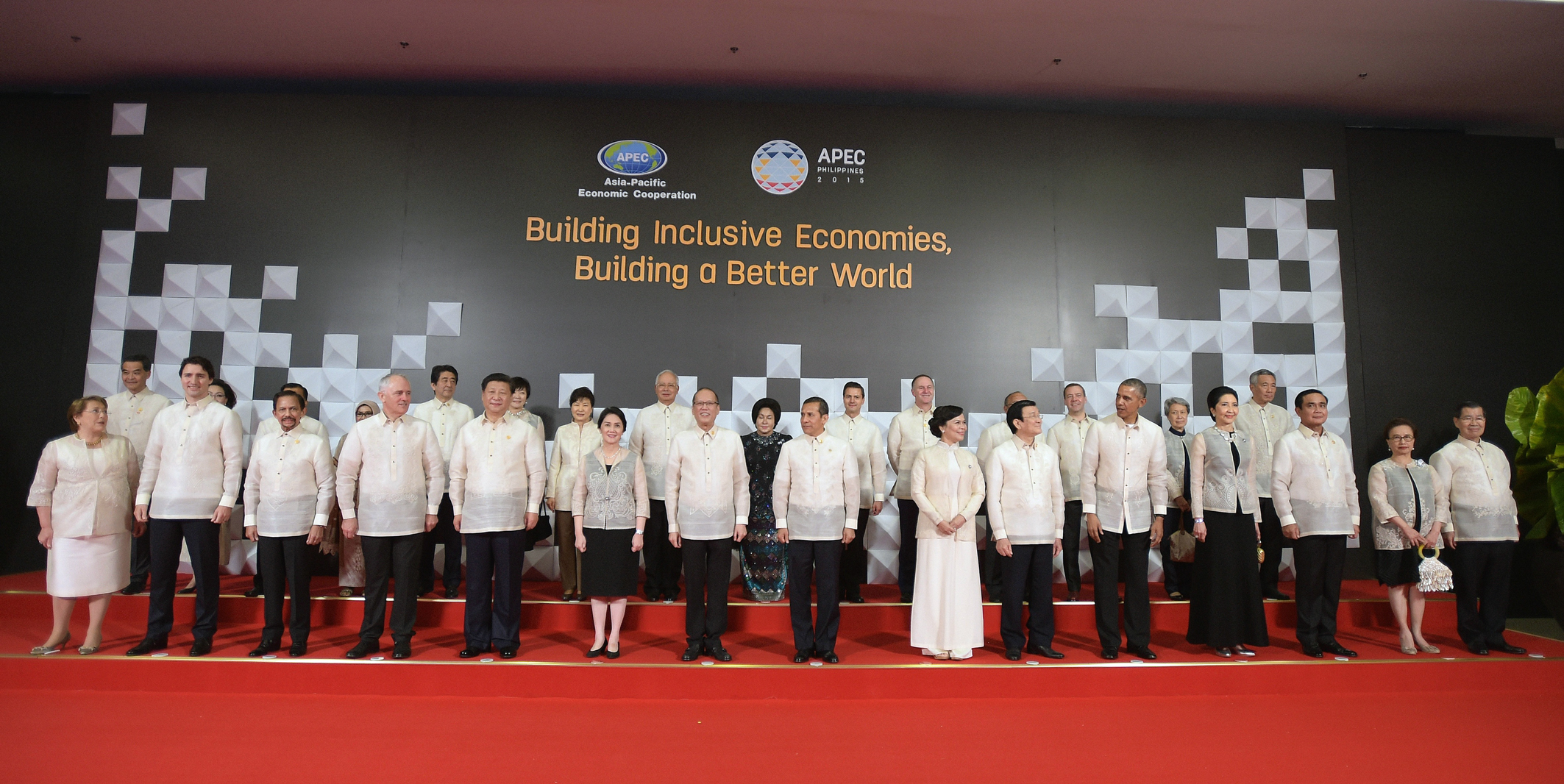
- APEC Philippines 2015 delegates attired in barong tagalog
- Host country: Philippines
- Date: 18—19 November
- Motto: "Building Inclusive Economies, Building a Better World"
- Venues: Main venue Philippine International Convention Center, Pasay Other meetings 11 host locations: Clark (January–February); Subic (January); Tagaytay (March); Laoag (April); Manila (April, July–November); Bacolod (April); Boracay (May); Bagac (June); Iloilo City (July, September–October); Cebu City (August–October); Makati (November)
- Follows: APEC China 2014
- Precedes: APEC Peru 2016
- Website: apec2015.ph (archived)

APEC Philippines 2015 was the year-long hosting of the Asia-Pacific Economic Cooperation (APEC) meetings which concluded with the APEC Economic Leaders' Meeting held on 18–19 November 2015 in Pasay, Metro Manila. It was the second time the Philippines hosted the summit, the first being in 1996.

The meetings were held amid simmering tensions between China and several nations, including the Philippines, Japan, Vietnam and Malaysia because of the former's aggressive policy of claiming several uninhabited islands in the South China Sea. However, the Philippines decided to put aside the issue temporarily in keeping with its hosting duties. The summit was also held just days after the November 2015 Paris attacks which left 137 people dead, forcing the host country to enforce a lockdown of major streets near summit venues and hotels where the economic leaders were billeted, causing heavy traffic in major Metro Manila roads and inconvenience to commuters and motorists.

== Agenda ==
The agenda of the Philippines' hosting of APEC 2015 is exemplified through its theme which focuses on promoting and advancing inclusive growth in the Asia-Pacific region. This goal on promoting inclusive growth is divided into three stages: domestic/national, regional, and macro levels. There are also four priority set for APEC 2015:

1. Investing in Human Capital Development
2. Fostering Small and Medium Enterprises’ (SMEs) Participation in Regional and Global Markets
3. Building Sustainable and Resilient Communities
4. Enhancing the Regional Economic Integration Agenda

== Branding ==
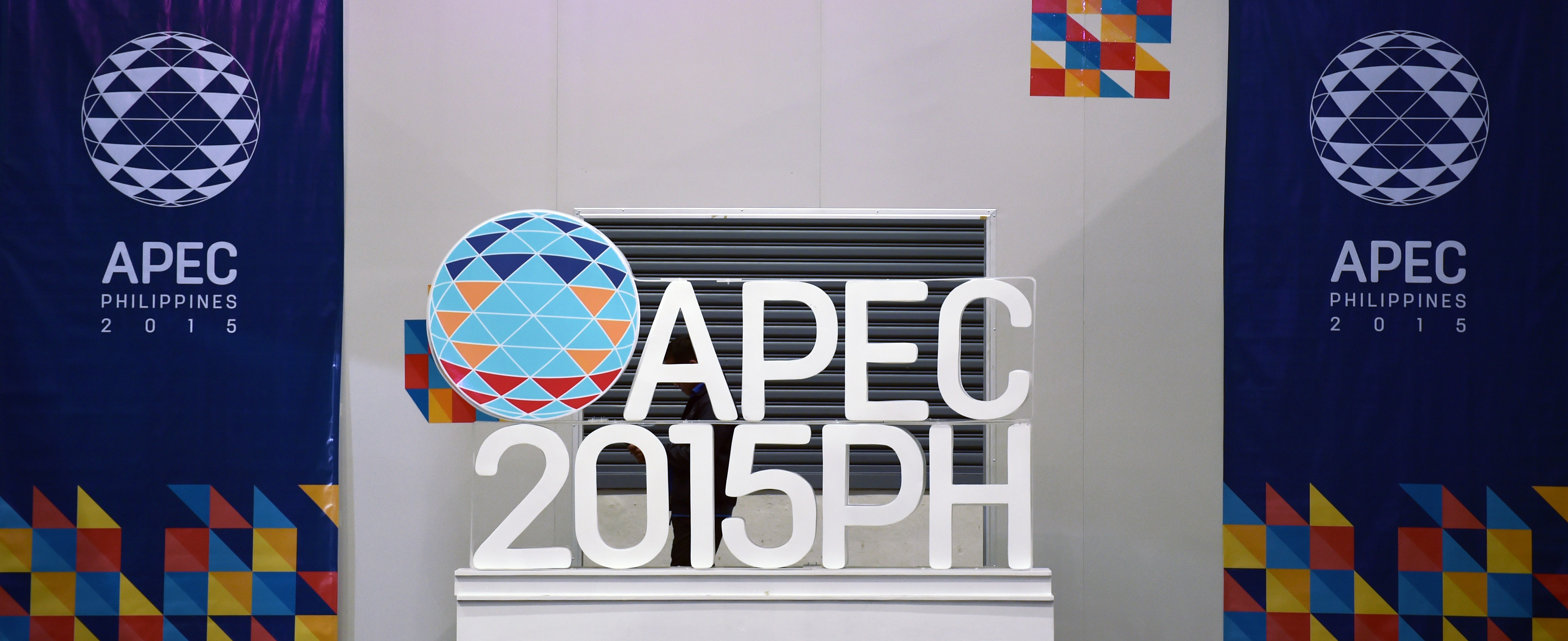
APEC 2015 banners and signage

The official APEC 2015 logo and theme, "Building Inclusive Economies, Building a Better World", were unveiled during the event, as well as its official Facebook and Twitter accounts.

The logo design was donated by INKSURGE Design Studio. The circle in the logo represents a global community which is described as more connected, more integrated and more dynamic, and where each APEC member-economies, both advanced and emerging contribute to shared development. The design also depicts the 21 APEC member-economies as blue, red and yellow triangles connected by common waters.

The sustained and shared economic growth of the member-economies are represented through an arrow pointed upward at the center of the globe, an image formed by the 21 triangles. The light blue shade of the arrow symbolized the promising development of a member-economy resulting from positive interaction with partners and compliance to sound macroeconomic fundamentals. The triangle itself symbolizes balance which leads to a strong and stable economy.

The three colors of the triangles represents the APEC's Pillars of Progress or the Bogor Goals: 1) Trade and investment liberalization; 2) Business facilitation through cost reduction and efficiency of business transactions, and; 3) Economic and technical cooperation among APEC member-economies. These goals were first outlined and described during the 1994 APEC summit in Indonesia.

== Preparations ==
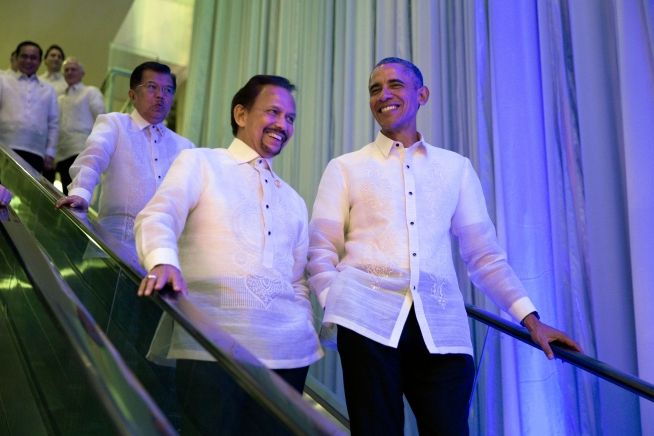
Brunei Sultan Hassanal Bolkiah and U.S. President Barack Obama wearing the barong tagalog at the welcome dinner, 18 November 2015

Preparations for APEC 2015 began with the signing of Administrative Order No. 36, s. 2012, which constituted the APEC 2015 National Organizing Council. On 1 December 2014, President Benigno Aquino III led the APEC 2015 national launch at a dinner in Makati. The Philippine government allocated approximately 10 billion pesos for the hosting of the APEC meetings.

=== Security ===
As part of the security measures for the APEC Economic Leaders' Meeting, the government declared 17–20 November as school holidays and 18–19 November as special non-working days in Metro Manila. Manila has also banned most activities in and around Roxas Boulevard and Manila Bay, such as fishing, sailing, swimming, and walking.

The Armed Forces of the Philippines (AFP) and the Philippine National Police (PNP) were placed from blue alert to red alert status on 14 November in preparation for the five-day event. The raising of alert status was done ahead of schedule due to a procedure by the police following any international terrorist incident, such as the attacks in Paris which occurred a day earlier. Nevertheless, the PNP assured the public that the alert status is due routine procedure and it has not monitored any specific threat. The AFP deployed its land, air, and naval assets at several undisclosed positions within Metro Manila.

=== Fashion and interior design ===
As part of the APEC tradition, custom-made barong tagalog clothing were designed by fashion designer Paul Cabral for the economic leaders to wear during the "family-photo" portion of the event to showcase Philippine fashion and talent. Meanwhile, Filipino industrial designer Kenneth Cobonpue was hired as the APEC creative director and was put in charge of decorating the interior of the Mall of Asia Arena in preparation for the APEC Economic Leaders' Welcome Dinner on 18 November 2015. His venue design took inspiration from the Banaue Rice Terraces, a World Heritage Site.

== Events ==
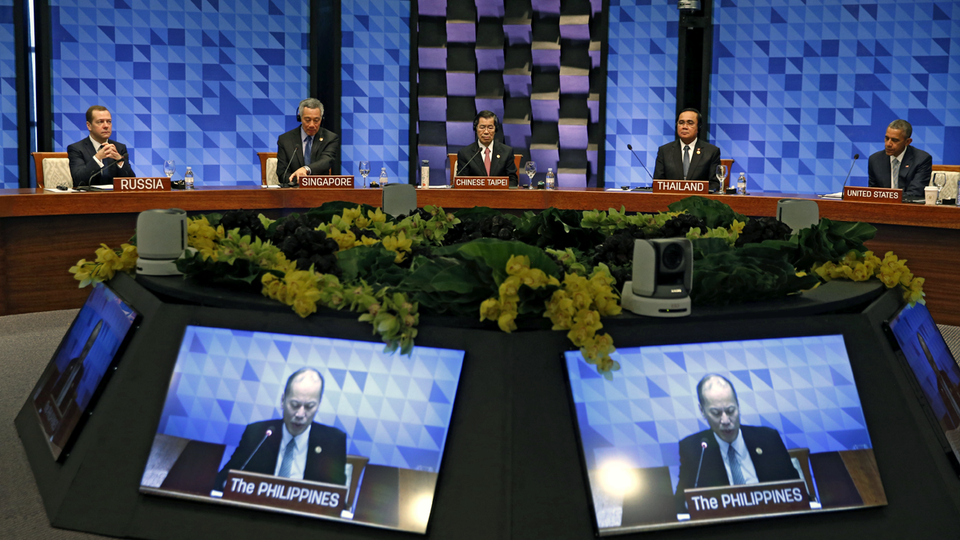
APEC Economic Leaders' Meeting at the Philippine International Convention Center in Pasay on 19 November 2015.

Philippine President Benigno Aquino III receives Chinese leader Xi Jinping at the opening of the Economic Leader's Meeting

Economic Leaders' Retreat on 19 November 2015

Makati in Metro Manila hosted the first APEC 2015 meeting, the Informal Senior Officials' Meeting (ISOM), from 8 to 9 December 2014. Originally slated to be held in Legazpi, Albay, the meeting was transferred to Makati as storm signals were raised in the former due to Typhoon Hagupit, locally known as Typhoon Ruby.

=== Senior officials and ministerial meetings ===
The First Senior Officials' Meeting and Related Meetings were held in Clark Freeport, Angeles, Pampanga and Subic Bay, Zambales, from 26 January to 7 February 2015.

The island of Boracay in Aklan hosted the Second Senior Officials' Meeting (SOM2) and Related Meetings from 9–21 May 2015 and the APEC Ministers Responsible for Trade (MRT) Meeting from 23 to 24 May.

The Third Senior Officials' Meeting (SOM3) and Related Meetings were held in Cebu City from 22 August to 6 September, followed by the APEC Finance Ministers' Meeting from 10 to 11 September. Other ministerial meetings and events were held in various locations in the Philippines, such as Iloilo City for the Small and Medium Enterprise ministerial meeting on 21–25 September, the Senior Disaster Management Officials Forum on 22–23 September, and the High-Level Policy Dialogue on Food Security and the Blue Economy and Related Meetings from 28 September to 6 October 2015 also in Iloilo City.

=== CEO Summit ===
The APEC CEO Summit was held on 16–18 November at the Makati Shangri-La Hotel. The theme of summit was "Creating the Future: Better, Stronger, Together".

=== Economic Leaders' Meeting ===
The highlight of the series of meetings, the Economic Leaders' Meeting, was held at the Philippine International Convention Center in Pasay, Metro Manila on 18–19 November. On the evening of 18 November, President Aquino hosted a welcome dinner for the visiting economic leaders at the Mall of Asia Arena.

==== Attendees ====
Colombian President Juan Manuel Santos represented his country in an observer status in the Economic Leaders' Meeting.

A week prior to the Economic Leaders' Meeting, Russian President Vladimir Putin and Indonesian President Joko Widodo, both of whom had initially announced their attendance, decided not to attend in the occasion citing their attendance to address their own domestic issues, particularly the ongoing investigation of the Metrojet Flight 9268 crash and the 2015 Southeast Asian haze, respectively. Putin was represented by former Russian President, now Prime Minister Dmitry Medvedev who was also scheduled to visit other Southeast Asian countries. Widodo was represented by his trade minister Thomas Lembong and Vice President Jusuf Kalla.

This was the first APEC meeting for Australian Prime Minister Malcolm Turnbull and Canadian Prime Minister Justin Trudeau since their inaugurations on 15 September 2015 and 4 November 2015, respectively.

It was also the last APEC meeting for the host, Philippine President Benigno Aquino III (who stepped down on 30 June 2016, following the 2016 Philippine presidential election and the inauguration of Rodrigo Duterte), as well as Vietnamese President Trương Tấn Sang (who stepped down on 2 April 2016), Peruvian President Ollanta Humala (who stepped down on 28 July 2016, following the 2016 Peruvian election), and South Korean President Park Geun-hye (who was ousted on 10 March 2017, following her impeachment in the 2016 South Korean political scandal).

Attendees at the 2015 APEC Economic Leaders' Meeting
Member Economy	Position	Name
Australia	Prime Minister	Malcolm Turnbull
Brunei	Sultan	Hassanal Bolkiah
Canada	Prime Minister	Justin Trudeau
Chile	President	Michelle Bachelet
China	President (Note: The president of China is legally a ceremonial representative with no real power, but the general secretary of the Chinese Communist Party (de facto leader in one-party communist state) has always held this office since 1993 except for the months of transition.)	Xi Jinping
Colombia (invited guest)	President	Juan Manuel Santos
Hong Kong	Chief Executive	Leung Chun-ying
Indonesia*	Vice President	Jusuf Kalla
Japan	Prime Minister	Shinzō Abe
South Korea	President	Park Geun-hye
Malaysia	Prime Minister	Najib Razak
Mexico	President	Enrique Peña Nieto
New Zealand	Prime Minister	John Key
Papua New Guinea	Prime Minister	Peter O'Neill
Peru	President	Ollanta Humala
Philippines	President	Benigno Aquino III (host)
Russia*	Prime Minister	Dmitry Medvedev
Singapore	Prime Minister	Lee Hsien Loong
Taiwan	Special Representative	Siew Wan-chang
Thailand	Prime Minister	Prayuth Chan-ocha
United States	President	Barack Obama
Vietnam	President (Note: The actual head of government of Vietnam is the Prime Minister. The President of Vietnam is legally the head of state, but the General Secretary of the Communist Party of Vietnam is the practical highest political leader in one-party communist state.)	Trương Tấn Sang
(*) Indonesian President Joko Widodo and Russian President Vladimir Putin did not attend the leaders summit. Representatives of both countries were sent and attended on their behalf.

==== Declaration ====
The declaration was sealed by the APEC economic leaders on 19 November 2015. Among the five main points of the declaration were related to fighting terrorism, poverty and climate change, continuous economic growth, and the global economic outlook.

==== Bilateral meetings ====
Aside from the Economic Leaders' Meeting itself, some leaders met with each other in separate bilateral meetings within the week of the leaders' meet.

Chilean President Michelle Bachelet and Mexican President Enrique Peña Nieto were hosted state visits by Aquino at Malacañang Palace on 16 and 17 November, respectively, prior to the meeting.

Aquino met with U.S. President Barack Obama on 18 November. During their meeting, Obama reassured the United States' commitment to assisting the Philippines in resolving the territorial disputes in the South China Sea through joint exercises between the AFP and the United States Armed Forces, known as Balikatan ("shoulder-to-shoulder"). Prior to the meeting, Obama met with the Philippine Navy and visited the BRP Gregorio del Pilar (PF-15), where he announced that the U.S. government would donate the research vessel RV Melville and two Hamilton-class cutters to the Philippine Navy, one of which will be the USCGC Boutwell (WHEC-719). Aquino also met with Russian Prime Minister Dmitry Medvedev later that day.

Japanese Prime Minister Shinzō Abe and Obama held a bilateral meeting on 19 November and talked about issues on the reallocation of U.S. Marines from the US base in Okinawa to Guam and the planned Trans-Pacific Partnership.

== Criticism ==
=== Travel impact ===
Commuters and motorists took on social networking sites on the heavy traffic situation caused by the road closures and rerouting schemes in different Metro Manila roads in anticipation to the APEC meeting. Palace spokesperson Edwin Lacierda apologized for the inconvenience brought about by the heavy traffic in Manila roads and asking the public for patience on the road advisories being implemented.

=== Treatment of homeless people ===
Human Rights Watch has reported that the government's preparation for the Economic Leaders' Meeting extended to the homeless and impoverished people, including street children and vendors, who were either detained or relocated to other parts of Metro Manila. The government denied such allegations of abuse and said that the actions were not only done for the APEC summit and such are part of its regular outreach program.

=== Protests ===
During the APEC Economic Leaders' Summit on 18–19 November, the Bagong Alyansang Makabayan conducted protests along Gil Puyat Avenue, Pasay, against China's aggressive policy of claiming islands in the South China Sea, against the United States regarding what they describe as US imperialism because of the Philippines–United States Visiting Forces Agreement (VFA) and Enhanced Defense Cooperation Agreement (EDCA), as well as APEC itself, globalization, and poverty in the Philippines. Meanwhile, tribal leaders and members from various Lumad tribes in Mindanao also gathered at the Redemptorist Church grounds in Baclaran, Pasay, to protest what they describe as APEC's promotion of militarization and encroachment of indigenous communities in favor of resource extraction by transnational mining companies.

On 18 November, members of the People for the Ethical Treatment of Animals (PETA) staged their own protest action in Makati while dressed as animal mascots. PETA called on APEC economic leaders to promote to climate change awareness and conversion to vegan life for the welfare of the animals.

== See also ==
- 2015 G20 Antalya summit in Antalya, Turkey (held 15–16 November 2015, eleven of the 20 leaders met there before (Note: The leaders of Australia, Canada, China, Indonesia, Japan, Mexico, Russia, South Korea, and the United States met there as members in both organizations, while Malaysia and Singapore were invited guests.))
- Tenth East Asia Summit in Kuala Lumpur, Malaysia (held 21–22 November 2015, 13 of the 20 leaders met there again (Note: The leaders/representatives of Australia, Brunei, Indonesia, Japan, Malaysia, New Zealand, Philippines, Russia, Singapore, South Korea, Thailand, United States, and Vietnam met there as members in both organizations.))

== Notes ==
Preceded by APEC China 2014	APEC meetings 2015	Succeeded by APEC Peru 2016
