= USCGC Boutwell (WHEC-719) =

Ship of the US Coast Guard (1968-2016)

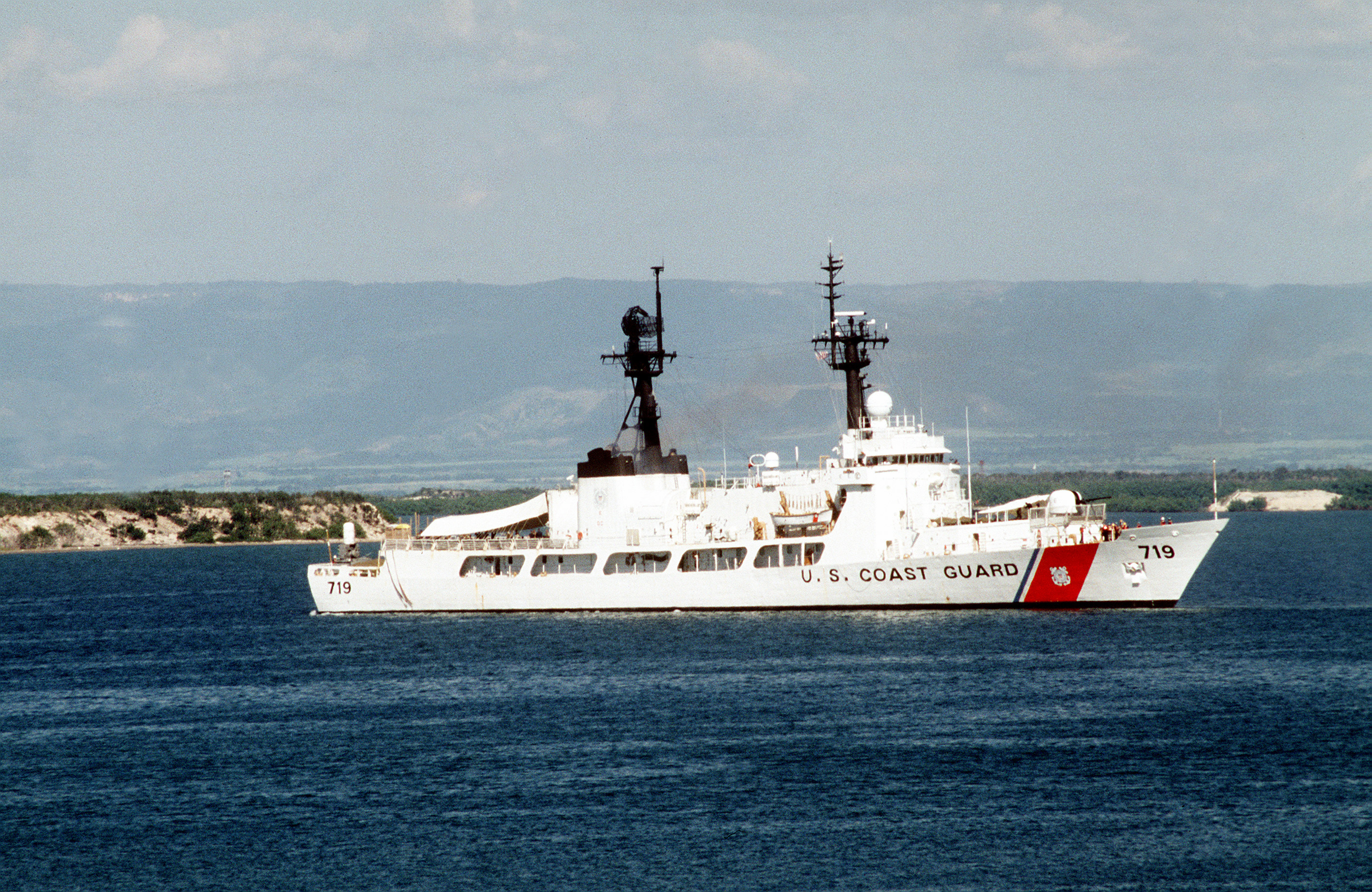
- USCGC Boutwell (WHEC-719)

History

United States
- Name: Boutwell
- Namesake: George S. Boutwell
- Builder: Avondale Shipyards
- Cost: US$15 million
- Laid down: 1967
- Launched: 17 June 1967
- Sponsored by: Mrs. Douglas Dillon
- Commissioned: 1968
- Decommissioned: March 16, 2016
- Home port: San Diego, California
- Identification: MMSI number: 367282000; Callsign: NYCQ; Hull number: WHEC-719
- Motto: "Best in the West"
- Fate: Decommissioned March 16, 2016 transferred to the Philippine Navy

General characteristics
- Class & type: Hamilton-class cutter
- Displacement: 3,250 tons
- Length: 378 ft (115.21 m)
- Beam: 43 ft (13.11 m)
- Draft: 15 ft (4.57 m)
- Propulsion: CODOG: 2 × FM diesel engines; 2 × PW gas turbines
- Speed: 29 knots (54 km/h)
- Range: 14,000 miles
- Endurance: 45 days
- Boats & landing craft carried: 2 x OTH
- Complement: 167 personnel
- Sensors & processing systems: Mk-92 FCS; AN/SPS-40 air-search radar; AN/SPS-73 surface-search radar
- Electronic warfare & decoys: WLR-1H Electronic Support; 2 x Mk-36 SRBOC
- Armament: Otobreda 76 mm gun; Phalanx CIWS; 2 x Mark 38 25 mm "Bushmaster" guns
- Aircraft carried: 1 x HH-65 Dolphin helicopter
- Aviation facilities: Retractable hangar

USCGC Boutwell (WHEC-719) was a United States Coast Guard high endurance cutter based out of San Diego, California. Named for George S. Boutwell, United States Secretary of the Treasury under President Ulysses S. Grant. Boutwell engaged in many Coast Guard missions, including search and rescue, law enforcement, maritime security, and national defense.

Boutwell was decommissioned on March 16, 2016 at Naval Base San Diego, California. She was then sold to the Philippines as Excess Defense Article (EDA) and rechristened the BRP Andrés Bonifacio (FF-17), becoming the third Hamilton-class cutter to be transferred to the Philippine Navy.

== History ==
USCGC Boutwell was the fifth of the Coast Guard's fleet of 378-foot (115 m) high endurance cutters. She was built in 1967 in the Avondale Shipyards in New Orleans, Louisiana. She was launched on 17 June 1967, and her launching sponsor was Mrs. Douglas Dillon. After she was commissioned in 1968, she proceeded to her first home port, Boston, Massachusetts. In 1973 she moved to Seattle, Washington, where she remained until she entered the Fleet Renovation and Modernization Program in 1990. Once her renovation was complete she moved to Coast Guard Island in Alameda, California. In 2011 she relocated to San Diego, California, to replace the decommissioned high endurance cutter USCGC Hamilton.

In 1980 Boutwell conducted the largest at-sea rescue ever achieved, when she rescued more than 500 people from the burning cruise ship Prinsendam in the Gulf of Alaska. When the 43-foot (13.1 m) halibut fishing vessel Comet sank in the Bering Sea approximately 25 nautical miles (46 km; 29 mi) northeast of Dutch Harbor, Alaska, after her engine room flooded, Boutwell rescued her crew of four after they had been in the water for only four minutes. In 1998, Boutwell made the largest high-seas drift net arrest in Coast Guard history.

Boutwell participated in the 2003 invasion of Iraq. She defended the oil terminals off the coasts of Iraq and Iran. For her many accomplishments and continued excellence, Boutwell received the Admiral John B. Hayes Award for Unit Excellence. In 2005, she seized 28,000 pounds (13,000 kg) of cocaine over US$900 million using the newly developed Go-Fast Response Team. With the help of a helicopter from the new Helicopter Interdiction Tactical Squadron (HITRON), Boutwell demonstrated a capability to stop and seize drugs from every go-fast boat she pursued.

Boutwell was recognized as the 2013 Forrest O. Rednour Memorial Award Large Afloat Dining Facility and as the second-place winner for the 2014 Large Unit Afloat MWR [Morale, Welfare, and Recreation] Program of the Year. In October 2014, Boutwell completed a noteworthy counterdrug deployment in support of the U.S. Coast Guard's Western Hemisphere Strategy; this deployment was cited by Commandant of the Coast Guard Admiral Paul Zukunft as an example of how better integration of operations and intelligence can have an impact on smuggling in the Western Hemisphere.

After U.S. President Barack Obama announced during the Asia-Pacific Economic Cooperation (APEC) Economic Leaders' Meeting in November 2015 that concluded the 2015 APEC summit in Manila that the United States would make a U.S. Coast Guard high endurance cutter and the Scripps Institution of Oceanography research vessel Melville available to the Philippines, Boutwell was decommissioned on 16 March 2016 at Naval Base San Diego, California, and sold to the Philippines as an excess defense article (EDA). Boutwell was the third Hamilton-class cutter to be transferred to the Philippine Navy.
