= USCGC Hamilton (WHEC-715) =

Hamilton-class cutter of the US Coast Guard

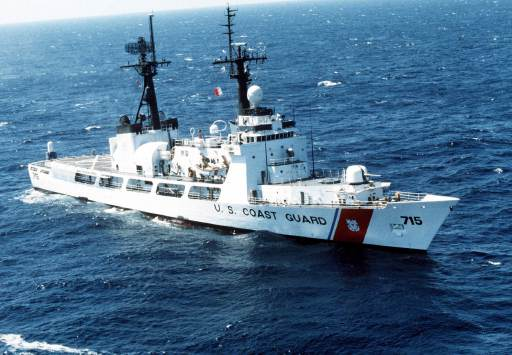
- USCGC Hamilton (WHEC-715)

History

United States
- Name: Hamilton
- Namesake: Alexander Hamilton
- Builder: Avondale Shipyards
- Launched: December 18, 1965
- Commissioned: March 18, 1967
- Decommissioned: March 28, 2011
- Motto: Semper Paratus; (Always Ready)
- Fate: Decommissioned and transferred as an Excess Defense Article to the Philippines as BRP Gregorio del Pilar
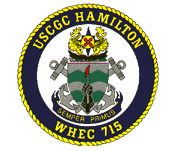
- Badge

General characteristics
- Class & type: Hamilton-class high endurance cutter
- Displacement: 3,250 tons
- Length: 378 ft (115.2 m)
- Beam: 43 ft (13.1 m)
- Propulsion: Two Fairbanks-Morse diesel engines and two Pratt & Whitney gas turbine engines
- Speed: 28 knots (52 km/h) max
- Range: 14,000 nautical miles (25,900 km)
- Endurance: 45 days
- Complement: 167
- Sensors & processing systems: AN/SPS-40 air-search radar MK 92 Fire Control System
- Armament: 1 × Otobreda 76 mm cannon; 2 × 25 mm Mk38 guns; 1 × 20 mm Phalanx CIWS

USCGC Hamilton (WHEC-715) was a United States Coast Guard high endurance cutter and the lead ship of its class. It was based at Boston, Massachusetts from commissioning until 1991, then out of San Pedro, California before it was moved to its last home port in San Diego, California. It was launched on December 18, 1965 at Avondale Shipyards near New Orleans, Louisiana and named for Founding Father Alexander Hamilton, the first United States Secretary of the Treasury and founder of the United States Revenue Cutter Service. It was commissioned on March 18, 1967.

It was decommissioned on March 28, 2011 and transferred to the Philippine Navy as an excess defense article under the Foreign Assistance Act on May 13, 2011 as BRP Gregorio del Pilar.

== Design ==
The United States Coast Guard designed a high level of habitability into Hamilton. Living compartments and areas provided fairly comfortable accommodations, including air conditioning, for the 173 men and women aboard.

=== Propulsion ===
Hamilton was the first U.S. military vessel to employ the now common shipboard application of aircraft gas turbine jet engines and controllable pitch propellers. Its two 18,000-horsepower (13,000 kW) Pratt & Whitney gas turbines could propel it at speeds up to 28 knots (52 km/h). It also has two 3,500-horsepower (2,600 kW) Fairbanks-Morse diesel engines, capable of driving it economically at 17 knots (31 km/h) for up to 14,400 nautical miles (26,700 km) without refueling. A retractable/rotatable bow propulsion unit provides exceptional maneuverability in tight situations.

=== Flight support ===
Hamilton's flight deck and hangar, capable of handling both Coast Guard and United States Navy helicopters, extended the vessel's rescue and maritime law enforcement operations.

== Renovation ==
In 1988, Hamilton completed a three-year fleet renovation and modernization that provided it with modern weapons and electronics systems, including Harpoon missiles and a modernized anti-submarine warfare suite. All spaces and machinery were also overhauled and refurbished. The new technology enabled it to operate seamlessly with the United States Navy.

== Missions ==
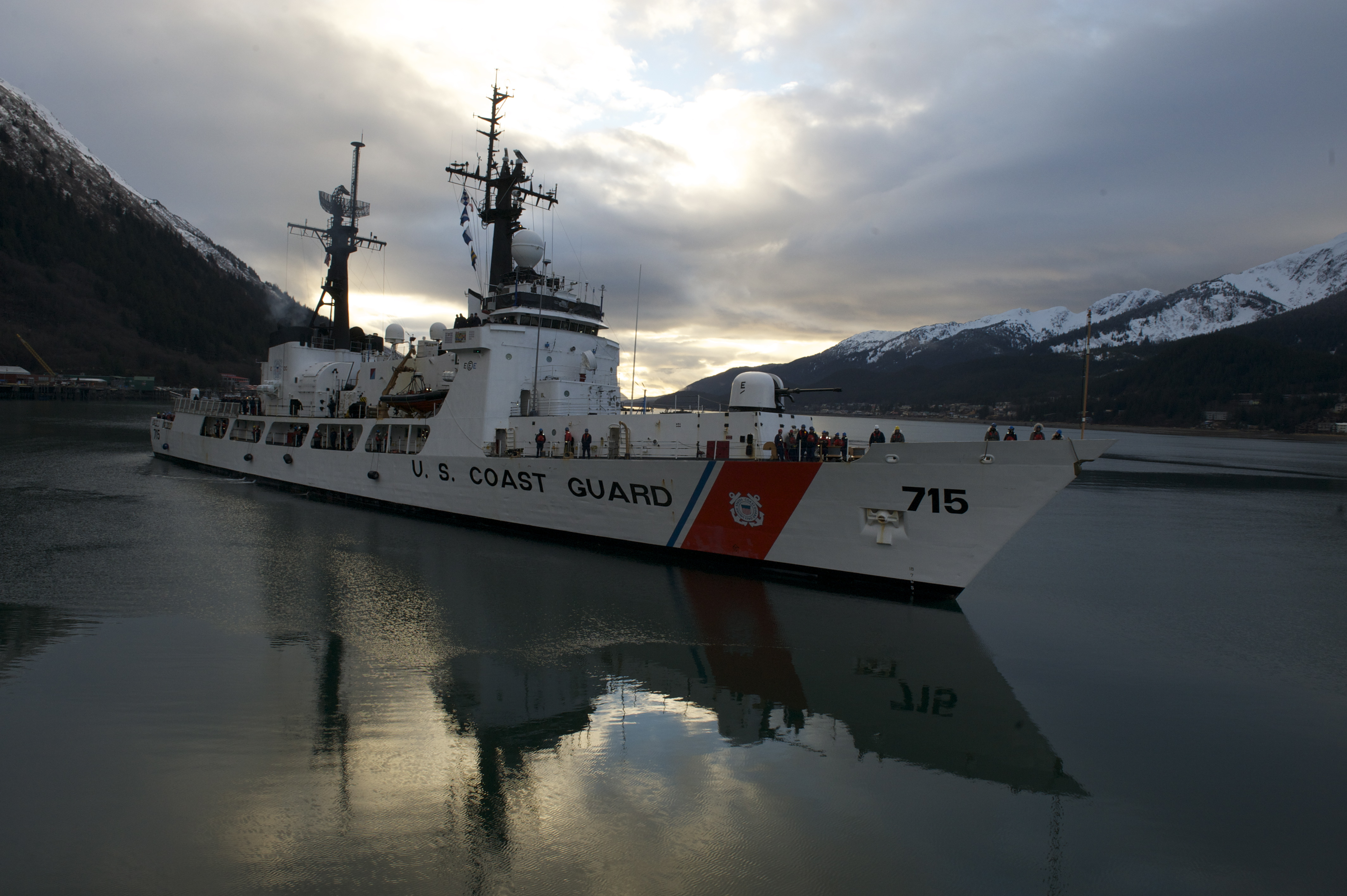
Coast Guard Cutter Hamilton makes its descent towards the Coast Guard Station Juneau pier after spending three months patrolling in the Bering Sea Feb. 4, 2011.

Hamilton served a variety of missions with distinction. During a 1969–1970 deployment to Vietnam, it interdicted weapons smugglers and fired more than 4,600 rounds in support of U.S. and South Vietnamese troops ashore. From 1965–1975, it served on Atlantic Ocean stations, collecting valuable oceanographic data and conducting frequent search and rescue missions. It also directed the interdictions of over 21,000 Haitian migrants throughout the Caribbean during Operation Able Manner. In 1994, it received the Coast Guard Meritorious Unit Commendation for rescuing 135 Haitians after their sailboat capsized and sank. In 1996, it transited the Panama Canal and served as the command and control platform for Operation Frontier Shield, a multi-agency effort to curtail the influx of narcotics into the United States. Hamilton intercepted 14 drug-laden vessels carrying more than 115 tons of contraband worth 200 million dollars. In 1999, Hamilton seized over 2,700 kilograms (6,000 lb) of cocaine bound for the U.S. in the Eastern Pacific Ocean. It frequently patrolled the Bering Sea off the Alaskan coast at the Maritime Boundary Line (MBL) which separates the Russian and the United States' exclusive economic zones (EEZ). Hamilton's presence on the MBL deters foreign fishing vessels from fishing in the U.S. EEZ.

In March 2007, Hamilton assisted Sherman in the largest recorded maritime drug bust in history. The two vessels intercepted the Panamanian-flagged fishing vessel Gatun in international waters and seized 20 metric tons (20 long tons) of cocaine, with an estimated street value of $600 million. It was the largest drug bust in US history, and the largest interdiction at sea.

== Additional ==
The U.S. Navy League Cadet Corps (NLCC) has a commissioned unit named after USCGC Hamilton. The unit's name is Training Ship Hamilton; it is located in San Pedro, California.
