= Gallatin =

Gallatin may refer to the following:

== Places in the United States ==
- Gallatin, California, now part of Downey
- Gallatin, Missouri, a city
- Gallatin, New York, a town
- Gallatin, Tennessee, a city
- Gallatin, Texas, a city
- Gallatin County, Illinois
- Gallatin County, Kentucky
- Gallatin County, Montana
- Gallatin Field Airport in Bozeman, Montana
- Gallatin River, in Wyoming and Montana
- Gallatin Range, includes ten mountains in Wyoming and Montana
- Gallatin National Forest, Montana
- Gallatin Township, Clay County, Missouri

== Ships ==
- USS Gallatin (1807), a sailing ship used initially by the U.S. Revenue Cutter Service, fought in the War of 1812
- USS Gallatin (APA-169), a Haskell-class attack transport acquired by the U.S. Navy during World War II
- USRC Gallatin, various cutters of the U.S. Revenue Cutter Service
- USCGC Gallatin, two U.S. Coast Guard ships

== Schools ==
- Gallatin College, Montana State University
- Gallatin School of Individualized Study, part of New York University
- Gallatin High School (disambiguation)
- Gallatin School (Uniontown, Pennsylvania), on the National Register of Historic Places

== Other uses ==
- Gallatin (surname)
- Gallatin Bank Building, constructed in 1887 in Manhattan
- The codename of an Intel Xeon microprocessor
