= USCGC Morgenthau =

1969 Hamilton-class cutter

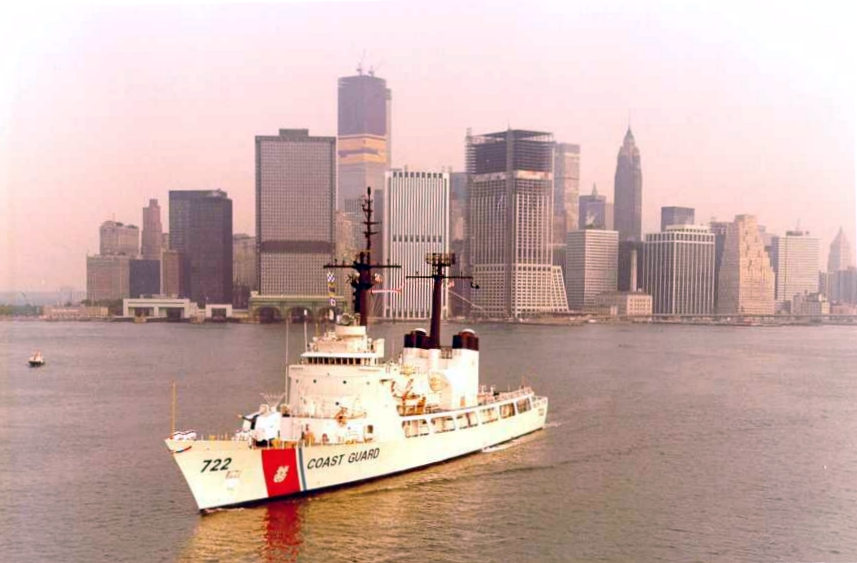
- Morgenthau off Governors Island in New York Harbor circa 1970; lower Manhattan is seen in the background. The twin towers of the World Trade Center and 55 Water Street are all seen under construction.

History

United States
- Name: Morgenthau
- Namesake: Henry Morgenthau Jr.
- Builder: Avondale Shipyards
- Commissioned: 10 March 1969
- Decommissioned: 18 April 2017
- Home port: Honolulu, Hawaii
- Identification: MMSI number: 367806000; Callsign: NDWA; Pennant number: WHEC-722
- Motto: Decus Pacifici; Pride of the Pacific
- Fate: Transferred to Vietnam
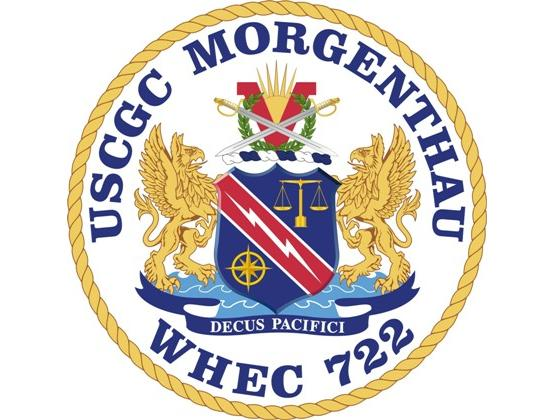
- Badge: Morgenthau's Crest

Vietnam
- Name: CSB 8020
- Operator: Vietnam Coast Guard
- Acquired: 27 May 2017
- Home port: Vũng Tàu, Vietnam
- Identification: MMSI number: 574120033; Callsign: CSB8020
- Status: Active

General characteristics
- Class & type: Hamilton-class cutter
- Displacement: 3,250 tons
- Length: 378 ft (115 m)
- Beam: 43 ft (13 m)
- Draught: 15 ft (4.6 m)
- Propulsion: 2 × Diesel engines; 2 × Gas turbine engines
- Speed: 29 knots (53.7 km/h)
- Range: 14,000 mi (22,531 km)
- Endurance: 45 days
- Complement: 160 (20 officers; 140 enlisted)
- Sensors & processing systems: AN/SPS-40 air-search radar
- Armament: Otobreda 76 mm main gun; Phalanx CIWS (removed before being acquired by VCG); 25 mm M242 Bushmaster autocannons; M2 Browning .50 Cal. machine guns; M240 light machine guns; various small arms.

CSB 8020 is a Vietnamese coast guard boat. She served previously as the USCGC Morgenthau (WHEC-722), and served as the eighth of twelve 378-foot dual-powered turbine/diesel Hamilton-class high endurance cutters (WHECs) built by Avondale Shipyards in New Orleans, Louisiana. The Coast Guard commissioned Morgenthau on March 10, 1969. After 48 years of continuous service the U.S. Coast Guard decommissioned Morgenthau on April 18, 2017, and the ship was sold to Vietnam. On 27 May 2017 the Vietnam Coast Guard commissioned the former cutter as patrol ship CSB 8020.

In the 1960s-1970s the "jet-powered" Hamilton-class cutters were state-of-the-art and technologically innovative. In 2011 the Coast Guard acknowledged its Hamilton-class cutters had far exceeded their planned service life and phased them out over the next ten years, replacing them with National Security Cutters.

In the 1960s the most distinctive aspect of these Hamilton-class cutters was the twin gas-turbine engines capable of propelling the cutter from 0 to 30+ knots in 60 seconds (and with its large variable-pitch propellers, coming to a full stop equally fast). Moreover, due to the Cold War, Hamilton-class cutters were configured for anti-submarine warfare (ASW): including the ability to detect, track, and destroy submarines.

Each 378' cutter had a helicopter flight deck, and retractable hangar within which to store a helicopter for missions. Other features noteworthy at the time included a variable-pitch propeller and bow thruster, allowing the ship to berth horizontally to a dock. As modern ships the cutters had comfortable crew and officer quarters, and the capability to stay at sea for 45 days.

Over its 48-year career (1969-2017) Morgenthau received numerous awards, commendations, and unit citations, including a Navy Meritorious Unit Commendation in 1971 during the Vietnam War, Combat Action Ribbon to the 1971 captain and crew, and multiple Battle "E" (Battle Effectiveness Award) for the ship's demonstrated excellence and superior achievement during certification and qualification competitions.

Morgenthau had two crests and unit motto (commonly referred to as "unit patches"). When commissioned, Morgenthau had a shield style crest, with the motto "Efficiency and Honor is Our Destiny." When in 1977 Morgenthau moved to the San Francisco Bay Area and homeported in Alameda, the crest changed to a circular style with the Latin motto Decus Pacifici (although the Latin word decus can have different meanings, the U.S. Coast Guard translates the motto as "Pride of the Pacific").

== Historical Summary ==
When commissioned in 1969, Morgenthau homeported at Governors Island, New York.

From 1970 to 1971 the Morgenthau served in Vietnam, a participant in the U.S. Navy's Operation Market Time.

In 1977 Morgenthau moved to the Pacific side of the United States and homeported at Integrated Support Command Alameda, Coast Guard Island, Alameda, California. The cutter homeported in Alameda until December 2012.

Also in 1977 Morgenthau was one of two test cutters to experiment with mixed gender crews at sea. The female contingent included 10 enlisted women and two female officers.

In January 2013 Morgenthau sailed to her new homeport in Honolulu, Hawaii, after a December 13, 2012, hull swap with the crew of the USCGC Jarvis. (A "hull swap" is an operation where the entire crew of a ship transfers from one ship to another similar ship.) Jarvis had been slated for decommissioning and transfer to a foreign navy.

In 2016 the U.S. Coast Guard announced that on April 18, 2017, Morgenthau would be decommissioned from its home port in Honolulu, Hawaii.

On April 18, 2017, Morgenthau was decommissioned at the Coast Guard Station, Sand Island, Honolulu, Hawaii.

Post decommissioning: After removal of classified equipment and specified weaponry Morgenthau was designated for purchase by Vietnam.

The United States transferred Morgenthau to the Vietnam Coast Guard on 28 May 2017, pursuant to the Excess Defense Articles program. Vietnam has commissioned the ship as CSB 8020.

== Operational Highlights: 1970-71 (Vietnam War) ==
Soon after its commissioning in 1970 Morgenthau sailed to Vietnam for service in the U.S. Navy's Operation Market Time.

Morgenthau was extremely active in the Vietnam War: the cutter's duties included boarding and inspection of North Vietnamese and Viet Cong ships and boats suspected of running guns, ammunition and supplies, naval gunfire support missions to the U.S. Army and U.S. Marines, the cutter's crew providing medical care to Vietnamese villagers (MEDCAPS - civic action program), ferrying Navy SEALs on missions, and general 24/7 patrol duties.

While powering up to full speed close to shore during an Operation Market Time patrol, Morgenthau struck an uncharted pinnacle. The cutter suffered significant damage, mainly to its large-bladed propellers that struck the pinnacle with such force that two several-ton propeller blades ripped off their mounts, flew 30 feet into the air, and then crashed into the water. Thinking they were under attack, Captain Lloyd Logan quickly ordered general quarters sounded.

Dead in the water, concerned about ambush, and that his ship was a "sitting duck," Captain Logan had his crew look busy on decks conducting maintenance and operations, to make it appear as if the ship anchored in the water was planned. Captain Logan further ordered the ship's guns manned at all times, and the ship's two heavily armed small boats to be at the ready for launching. The U.S. Navy gunboat USS Antelope patrolled around Morgenthau to provide additional firepower in the event the cutter was ambushed.

After a few days a seagoing U.S. Navy tug towed the disabled Morgenthau to the large U.S. Navy shipyard and base located at Subic Bay, Philippines. The cutter underwent a month in drydock for repairs, after which Morgenthau returned to duty in Vietnam.

From records compiled by then-Lieutenant Eugene N. Tulich, Commander, U.S. Coast Guard (Ret), Morgenthau's Vietnam numbers included:

- Miles cruised: 38,029 nautical miles (70,430 km; 43,763 mi)
- Percentage time underway: 72.8%
- Junks/sampans detected/inspected/boarded: 2383/627/63
- Enemy confirmed killed in action (KIA): 14
- Structures destroyed/damaged: 32/37
- Bunkers destroyed/damaged: 12/3
- Waterborne craft destroyed/damaged: 7/3
- Naval Gunfire Support Missions (NGFS): 19
- MEDCAPS (Medical Civic Action Program): 25
- Patients treated: 2676

For exceptionally valorous action in combat, Morgenthau received a number of awards and commendations, including a Navy Unit Commendation when Morgenthau distinguished itself with outstanding heroism in action against the enemy. Morgenthau's actions included its multi-day stealth tracking of a 160-foot enemy ship that U.S. intelligence services identified as a North Vietnamese SL-8 trawler, disguised as a fishing vessel, attempting to resupply North Vietnamese Army and Viet Cong soldiers waiting on shore. The tracking culminated in the April 11, 1971, destruction of the enemy ship after a two-hour gun battle with Morgenthau and U.S. Navy forces. The SL-8 trawler disappeared from Morganthau's radar screens in a massive explosion that killed all enemy combatants. For this and other Vietnam service, Morgenthau and its crew were awarded the Navy Combat Action Ribbon; Navy Unit Commendation; Navy Meritorious Unit Commendation; Vietnam Service Medal; Vietnam Gallantry Cross with Palm device; Vietnam Civil Actions Unit Citation; Vietnam Campaign Medal; and other awards.

Morgenthau served in Vietnam until relieved from Vietnam service in August 1971 by the USCGC Cook Inlet (WAVP-384), a 311-foot Casco-class cutter.

== Operational Highlights: 1972 to 2017 ==
In 1977, Morgenthau became the first Coast Guard cutter to have women permanently assigned, followed shortly thereafter by USCGC Mellon (WHEC-717).

Morgenthau's Pacific coast activities included drug interdiction and seizures, foreign and domestic fisheries enforcement, search and rescue, and alien migrant interdiction.

In 1989, Morgenthau was decommissioned to undergo a major mid-life renovation under the Fleet Rehabilitation and Modernization (FRAM). The cutter's FRAM included updating berthing and living spaces, rejuvenating engineering systems, and updating/modernizing major weapons and sensors. Upon recommissioning in 1991, Morgenthau resumed missions in the Pacific Ocean.

In the fall of 1996, Morgenthau was the first U.S. Coast Guard cutter to deploy to the Persian Gulf. Participating in Operation Vigilant Sentinel, Morgenthau enforced Iraq's compliance with United Nations sanctions.

After returning from the Persian Gulf, Morgenthau continued her Pacific duties, often deploying to the Maritime Boundary Line in the Bering Straits to monitor Alaska's valuable fisheries and environmental resources, as well as continued alien migrant and drug interdiction efforts off the coasts of Guam and Central and South America.

In early 2001 while on drug interdiction patrol off the coast of Mexico, Morgenthau seized $32 million worth of cocaine.

Also in 2001, during a fisheries patrol, Morgenthau's deployed helicopter discovered a Russian vessel fishing in U.S. waters. When the vessel refused to heave to and allow a Coast Guard law enforcement team aboard, Morgenthau pursued the vessel across the Bering Sea and up to Russian territorial seas. This resulted in a joint U.S.-Russian law enforcement action, which further cemented cooperative law enforcement actions between the two nations.

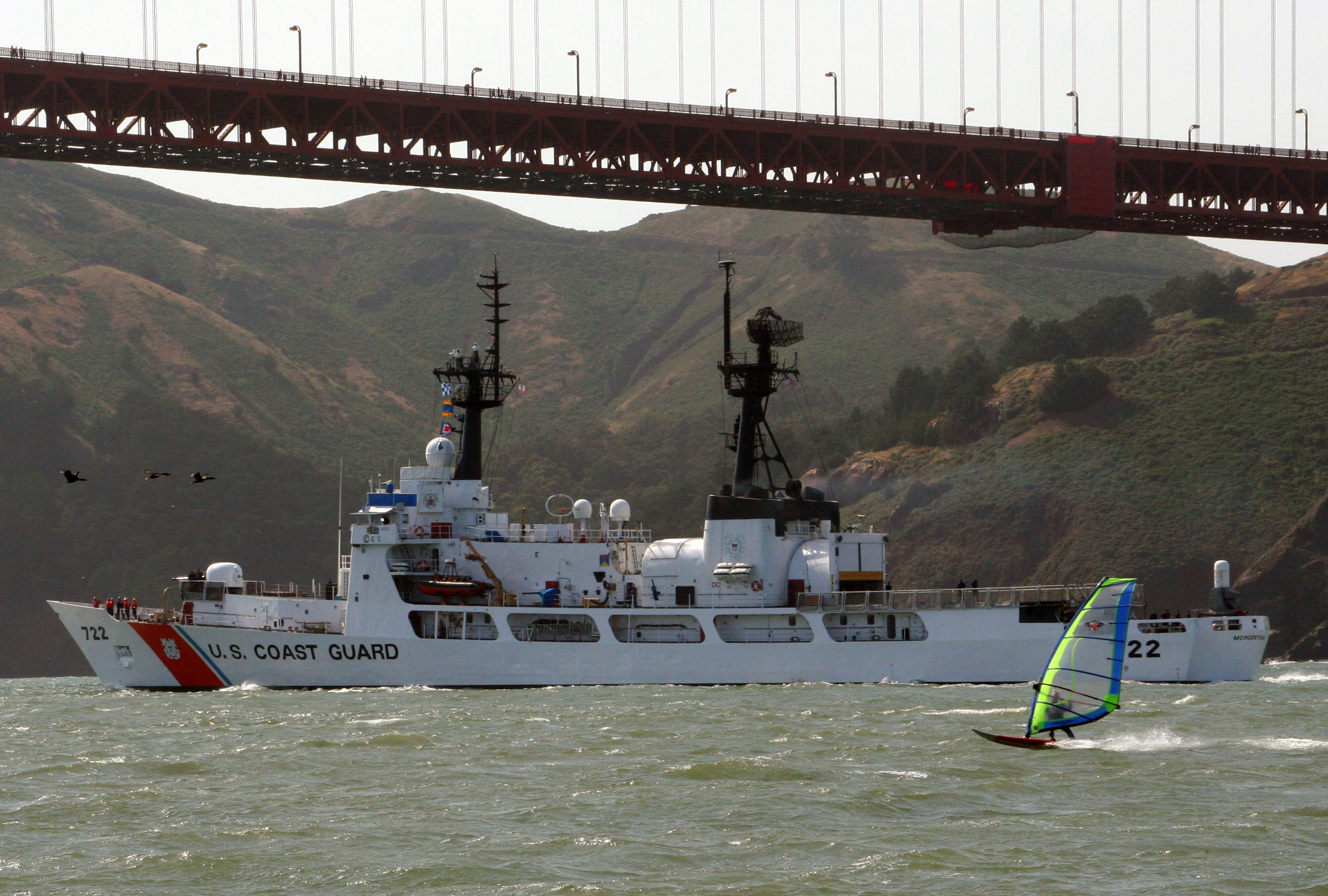
Morgenthau in May 2007 sailing out to sea under the Golden Gate Bridge

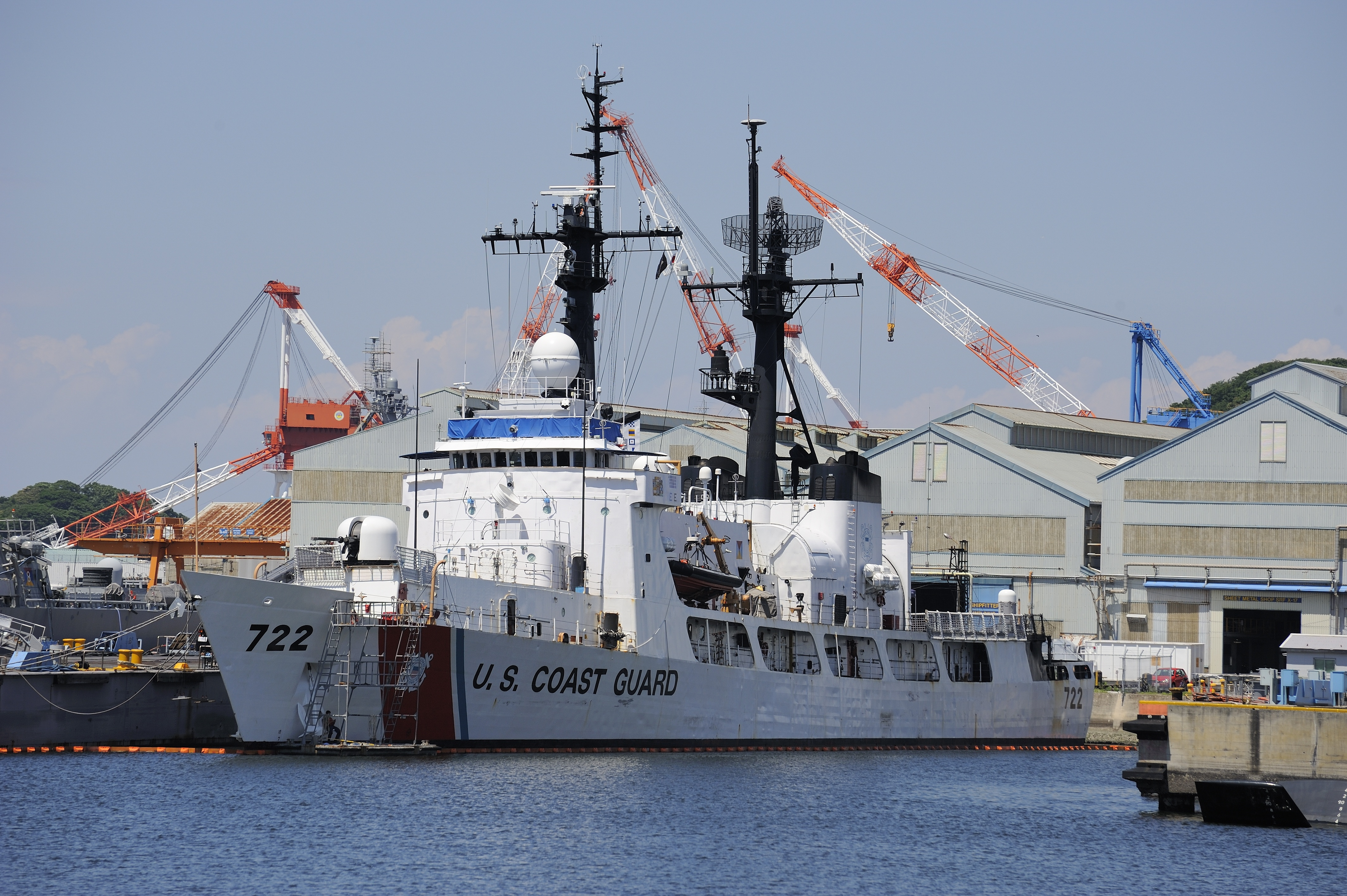
Morgenthau in June 14 2014 at the Port of Yokosuka, Japan

Later in 2001, during an extensive dry-dock period, Morgenthau was the first 378-foot cutter to install a stern flap, improving fuel efficiency and ride quality. Because of the increased fuel efficiency, Morgenthau has never since been able to complete full-power trials on turbines, as she reaches her maximum speed at a shaft horsepower significantly lower than other ships in her class.

After the terrorist attacks on September 11th, Morgenthau participated in Operation Noble Eagle to safeguard America's prominent port cities through closer scrutiny of maritime traffic.

In 2008, Morgenthau traveled to Southeast Asia to assist, train, and teach law enforcement techniques to naval forces of several nations in the East Asian littoral.

In November 2010, Morgenthau provided an emergency escort along with medical and security assistance to passengers stranded aboard the cruise ship Carnival Splendor, which was rendered inoperable in the Pacific Ocean by an engine fire.

In January 2013 Morgenthau arrived in its new home port in Honolulu, Hawaii. Morgenthau replaced her sister ship USCGC Jarvis (WHEC-725), the Jarvis having been decommissioned from the U.S. fleet, and transferred to the Bangladesh Navy under the Foreign Military Sales program.

In February 2015 Morgenthau entered dry-dock in Alameda, CA at Bay Ship & Yacht Co. for repairs.

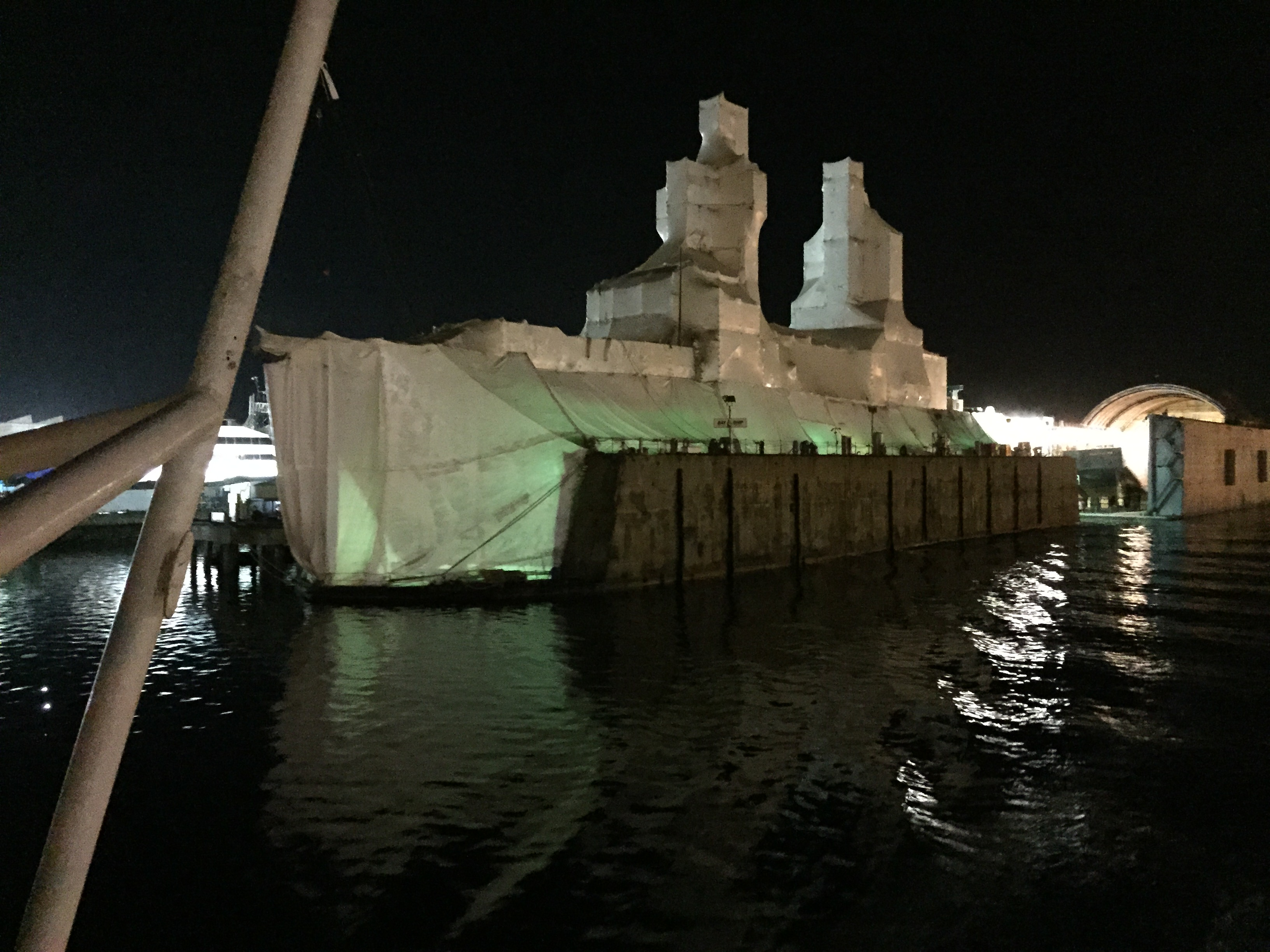
Under wraps at the dry-dock

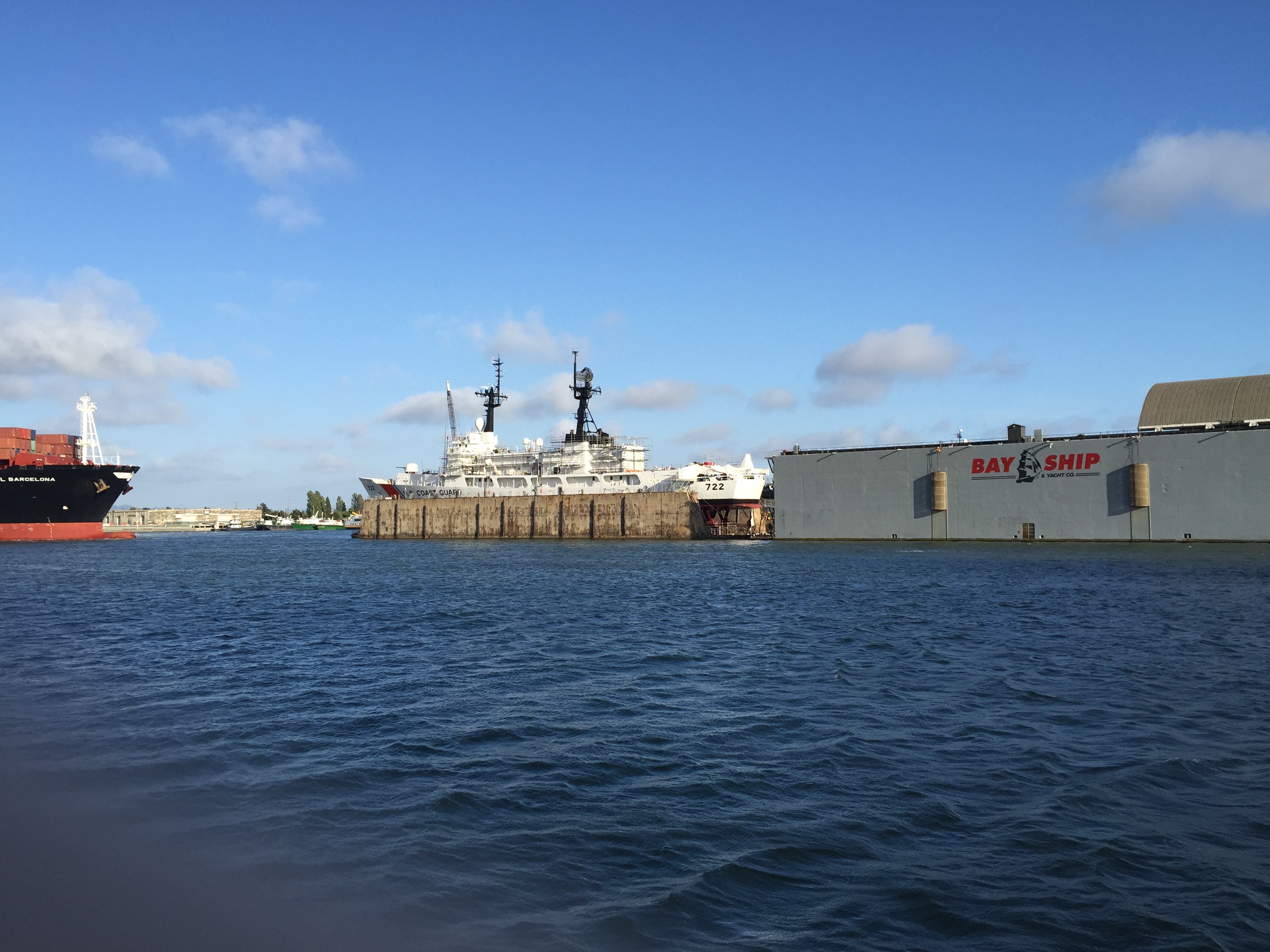
The ship's new paint job revealed

On April 18, 2017, Morgenthau was decommissioned at its home port in Honolulu, Hawaii. The Coast Guard announced Morgenthau would be acquired by Vietnam. The Coast Guard transferred Morgenthau to the Vietnam Coast Guard in a ceremony held in Honolulu on May 25, 2017. Vietnam commissioned the ship as patrol craft CSB 8020.

== Replacement by National Security Cutters; Transfer to Foreign Navies ==
The Morgenthau and her eleven sister Hamilton-class cutters were replaced by ten 418-foot Legend-class National Security Cutter, starting with USCGC Bertholf (WMSL-750), homeported in Alameda, California. The Coast Guard stated the National Security Cutters are better equipped, have a reduced radar signature, and are more durable, safer, and efficient than the 1960s Hamilton-class ships.

Under the Foreign Military Sales, Foreign Assistance Act, or other programs, decommissioned cutters can be made available for purchase by or transfer to other countries. The Hamilton-class cutters were decommissioned and subsequently transferred to foreign navies: USCGC Chase (WHEC-718) and USCGC Gallatin (WHEC-721) to the Nigerian Navy; USCGC Hamilton (WHEC-715), USCGC Dallas (WHEC-716) and USCGC Boutwell (WHEC-719) to the Philippine Navy; USCGC Jarvis (WHEC-725) and USCGC Rush (WHEC-723) to the Bangladesh Navy; and Morgenthau to the Vietnam Coast Guard as CSB 8020.
