= BNS Somudra Avijan =

Frigate of the Bangladesh Navy

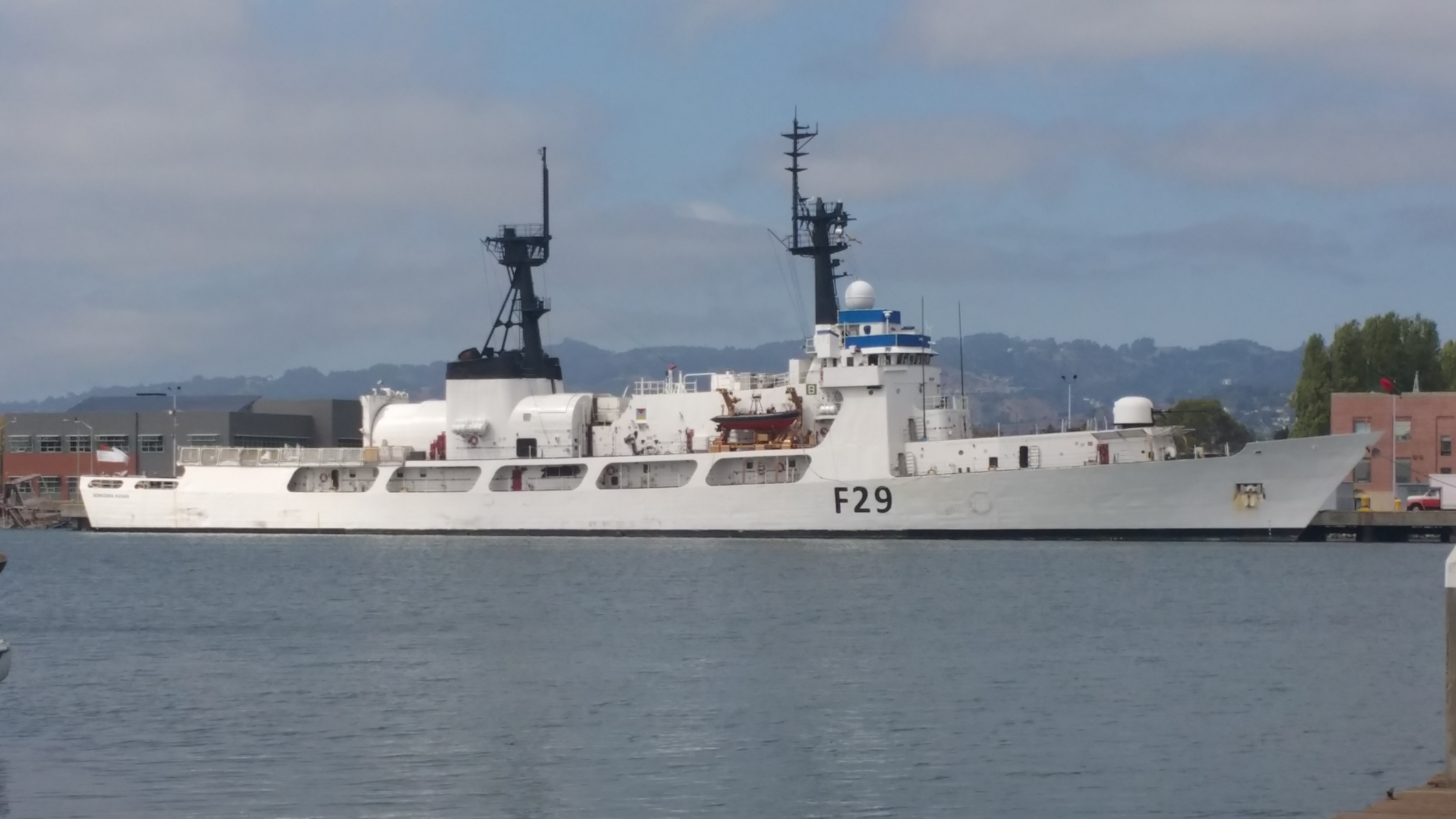
- BNS Somudra Avijan moored at USCG Alameda station

History

Bangladesh
- Name: Somudra Avijan
- Builder: Avondale Shipyards
- Launched: 16 November 1968
- Acquired: 5 May 2015
- Commissioned: 19 March 2016
- Home port: Chattogram
- Identification: MMSI number: 405000189; Pennant number: F29
- Nickname(s): BNS SA
- Status: Active

General characteristics
- Class & type: Hamilton-class cutter/ patrol frigate
- Displacement: 3,250 t
- Length: 378 ft (115 m)
- Beam: 43 ft (13 m)
- Draught: 15 ft (4.6 m)
- Propulsion: CODOG: 2 × FM diesel engines; 2 × PW gas turbines
- Speed: 29 knots (54 km/h; 33 mph)
- Range: 16,000 nmi (30,000 km; 18,000 mi)
- Endurance: 45 days
- Complement: 178 (21 officers and 157 enlisted)
- Sensors & processing systems: AN/SPS-40 air-search radar, MK 92 FCS
- Electronic warfare & decoys: 1 × Mark 36 SRBOC
- Armament: 1 × OTO Melara 76 mm (3 in) gun
- Aircraft carried: 1 × Hangar

BNS Somudra Avijan is one of the two largest ships of the Bangladesh Navy along with her sister ship BNS Somudra Joy. Although originally a high endurance cutter the Bangladesh Navy reclassified the ship as a frigate. The Bangladesh Navy acquired the ship from the United States under Excess Defense Articles.

== History ==
From 1969 to 2015 the ship was known as USCGC Rush and served the US Coast Guard as a high endurance cutter. She was decommissioned on 3 February 2015 and was acquired by Bangladesh under the Foreign Assistance Act as an Excess Defense Article. She was officially handed over to the Bangladesh Navy on 5 May 2015.

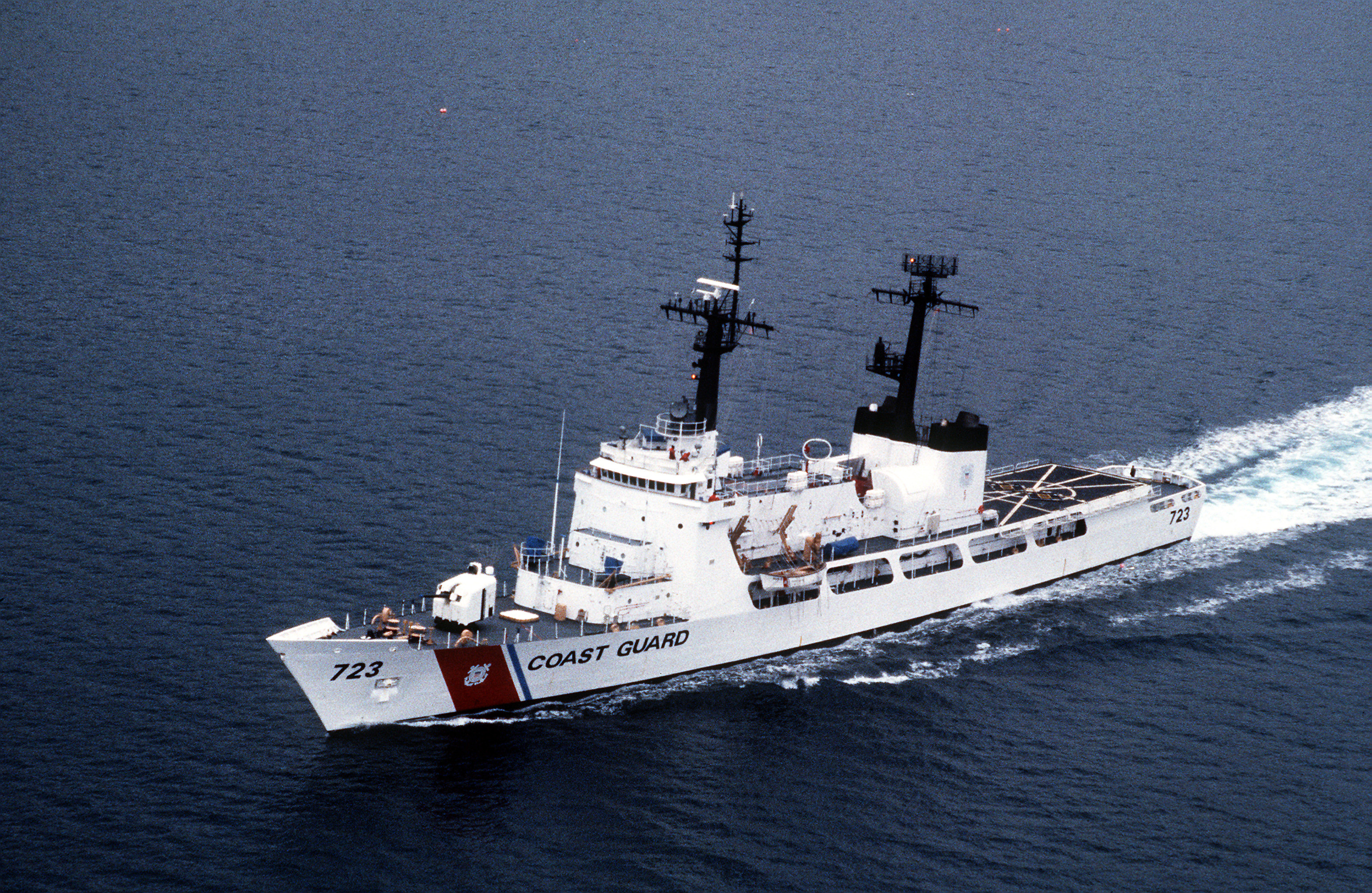
BNS Somudra Avijan had been used by U.S. Coast Guard as USCGC Rush before it was sent to Chattogram.

== Career ==
BNS Somudra Avijan visited the port of Manila, Philippines from 13 to 16 November 2015 on her way to Bangladesh from United States. She also visited Malaysia on her way. The ship arrived at Chattogram, Bangladesh on 28 November 2015. On 19 March 2016, she was commissioned by the Bangladesh Navy.

The ship took part in 15th Western Pacific Naval Symposium (WPNS) and 2nd Multilateral Naval Exercise Komodo (MNEK-2016), a multinational naval exercise arranged by Indonesian Navy for ASEAN and ASEAN+ nations held at Padang, Indonesia. On her way back, she visited Port Klang, Malaysia on a goodwill visit.

Somudra Avijan, with her sister ship Somudra Joy left Chattogram for India and Sri Lanka on a goodwill visit on 18 September 2016. The ships were at Port Blair, India from 21 to 25 September and at Colombo port, Sri Lanka from 29 September to 4 October. They returned Chattogram on 9 October 2016.

Somudra Avijan left for another goodwill visit in the neighboring countries in October 2017. She stayed at Visakhapatnam Port of India from 16 to 19 October 2017 . and at Colombo port of Sri Lanka from 23 to 29 October.

The ship left Chattogram on 18 April 2018 to take part in 3rd Multilateral Naval Exercise Komodo (MNEK-2018) to be held in Lombok, Indonesia from 4 May to 9 May 2018. On her way to Lombok, she will visit the Port Klang of Malaysia from 24 April to 27 April 2017. She will visit the Phuket of Thailand from 16 May to 20 May 2018 on her way back home. The ship returned home on 24 May 2018. She participated at the International Fleet Review 2026 held at Visakapatanam in India.

== See also ==
- List of active ships of the Bangladesh Navy
