= USCGC Rush (WHEC-723) =

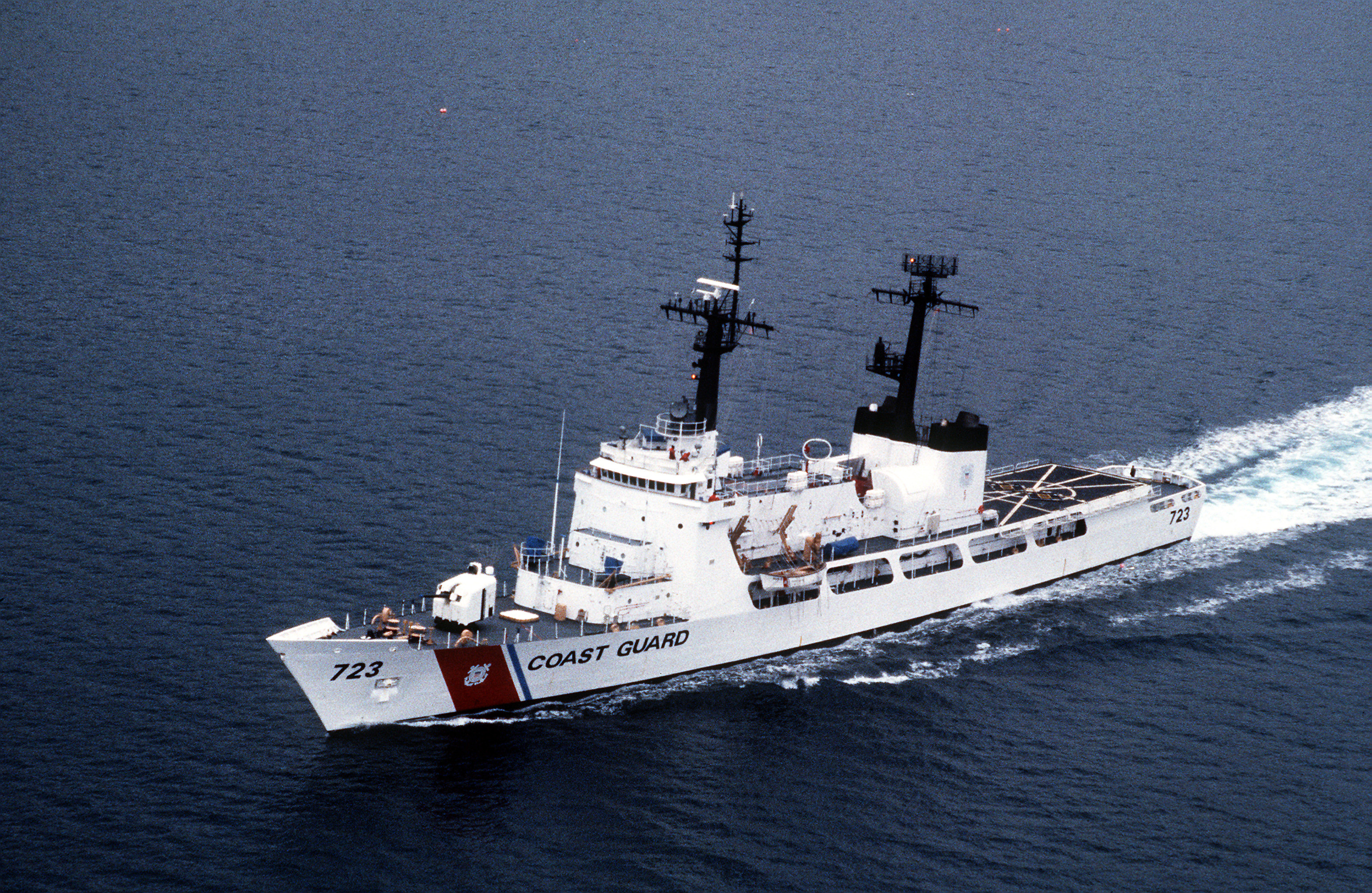
- USCGC Rush (WHEC-723)

History

United States
- Name: USCGC Rush
- Namesake: Richard Rush
- Builder: Avondale Shipyards
- Cost: $20 million
- Launched: 16 November 1968
- Commissioned: 3 July 1969
- Home port: Alameda, California(1970s) Honolulu, Hawaii
- Identification: MMSI number: 367283000; Callsign: NLVS
- Motto: Kia'i Kai No Ka Oi; (Watch Over the Rainbow)
- Fate: Transferred to the Bangladesh Navy

General characteristics
- Displacement: 3,250 tons
- Length: 378 ft (115.2 m)
- Beam: 43 ft (13.1 m)
- Draft: 15 ft (4.6 m)
- Propulsion: CODOG plant: 2 Fairbanks-Morse diesel engines; 2 Pratt and Whitney gas turbines
- Speed: 29 knots (54 km/h; 33 mph)
- Range: 14,000 miles
- Endurance: 45 days
- Boats & landing craft carried: 2 Over-the-Horizon type
- Complement: 167 personnel
- Sensors & processing systems: AN/SPS-40 air-search radar
- Armament: as built: Mark 12 5"/38-caliber gun; Mk2 81mm Mortar; Mark 32 Surface Vessel Torpedo Tubes (2x3); post FRAM; Otobreda 76 mm gun; Phalanx CIWS

USCGC Rush (WHEC-723) was a United States Coast Guard high endurance Hamilton-class cutter. The ship was named after Secretary of the Treasury Richard Rush. Rush was launched on November 16, 1968, commissioned on July 3, 1969, and was decommissioned on February 3, 2015 after 45 years of Coast Guard service.

As of January 2017, the ship serves in the Bangladesh Navy as BNS Somudra Avijan.

== History ==
=== Construction ===
As all Hamilton-class cutters, Rush was constructed at Avondale Shipyard near New Orleans, Louisiana and launched November 16, 1968, she was the fifth Coast Guard Cutter to be named after Secretary of the Treasury Richard Rush, the nation's eighth Secretary of Treasury.

=== Record Storm ===
During the 1970s, Rush was based out of Alameda Island in San Francisco Bay and performed regular patrols of Alaskan waters and the Bering Sea. Rush has the distinction of having ridden out "the most powerful storm, at least in terms of depth of pressure, to affect Alaska in modern history" of October 25, 1977. As the storm built, the bridge crew recorded a atmospheric pressure drop of one inch in twenty minutes. Under command of Captain Norman E. Fernald, Rush sustained damage to her sonar dome and superstructure, but completed her patrol. During the storm the decision was made to turn the Rush to take a following sea. The crew was sent to general quarters and the con was given to the Operations Officer, Lt. Paul Lundgren, who accomplished the turn on the side of a single wave.

=== Eastwood affair ===
The Rush assisted in the rescue of the East Wood affair, an incident of piracy in early 1993 aboard the cargo ship East Wood (also Eastwood). Chinese illegal immigrants took control of East Wood before she was taken back by her crew.

=== Decommissioning ===
On February 3, 2015, the United States Coast Guard officially decommissioned Rush with a ceremony held in Honolulu, Hawaii.

=== Bangladesh Navy ===
The Coast Guard has transferred Rush (now BNS Somudra Avijan) to the Bangladesh Navy as part of a Foreign Military Sale through the Foreign Assistance Act.

Rush is the Bangladesh Navy's second Hamilton-class cutter acquisition. The Bangladesh Navy's first Hamilton-class cutter acquired was USCGC Jarvis, given to Bangladesh in 2013. Jarvis is now named BNS Somudra Joy. The Bangladesh Navy designates these former Hamilton-class cutters as "patrol frigates."

== Awards ==
USCGC Rush earned numerous awards. Many of the ship's awards were earned for participation in the Vietnam War, as part of Operation Market Time. Awards listed were current to May 2014.

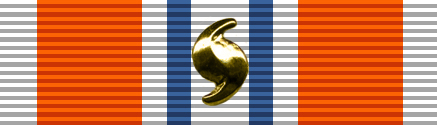

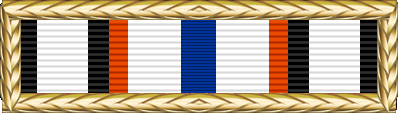

1st Row	Coast Guard Commendation Medal		
2nd Row	Combat Action Ribbon	Presidential Unit Citation w/ Hurricane Katrina clasp	Secretary of Transportation Outstanding Unit Award
3rd Row	Coast Guard Unit Commendation w/ Operational Distinguishing Device and four stars	Navy Unit Commendation	Coast Guard Meritorious Unit Commendation w/ Operational Distinguishing Device and six stars
4th Row	Coast Guard E Ribbon w/ seven stars	Coast Guard Bicentennial Unit Commendation	National Defense Service Medal w/ service star
5th Row	Armed Forces Expeditionary Medal	Vietnam Service Medal	Global War on Terrorism Service Medal
6th Row	Humanitarian Service Medal	Special Operations Service Ribbon	Coast Guard Sea Service Ribbon
7th Row	Vietnam Gallantry Cross Unit Citation	Vietnam Civil Actions Unit Citation	Vietnam Campaign Medal
