= Gallatin College =

Gallatin College may refer to the following schools in the United States:

- Gallatin College, Montana State University
- Gallatin School of Individualized Study, New York University

== See also ==
- Gallatin High School (disambiguation)
- Gallatin School (Uniontown, Pennsylvania)
