= Hamilton-class cutter =

United States Coast Guard cutter class

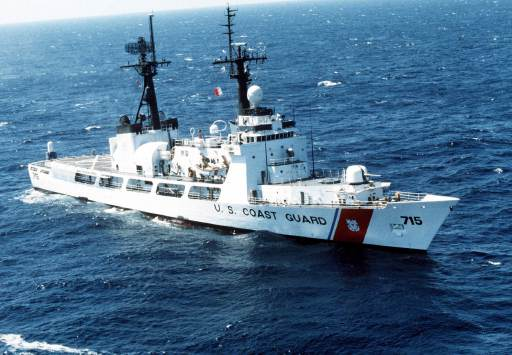
- USCGC Hamilton (WHEC-715), lead ship of the Hamilton class

Class overview
- Name: Hamilton class
- Builders: Avondale Shipyards
- Operators: See Operators
- Preceded by: Treasury-class cutter
- Succeeded by: Legend-class cutter
- Built: 1965–1972
- In commission: 1967–present
- Planned: 12
- Completed: 12
- Active: Serving in other countries: 2 Bangladesh Navy; 2 Nigerian Navy; 3 Philippine Navy; 2 Sri Lanka Navy; 3 Vietnam Coast Guard
- Retired: 12 United States Coast Guard

General characteristics
- Type: High endurance cutter / Large patrol vessel
- Displacement: 3,250 metric tons
- Length: 378 ft (115 m)
- Beam: 43 ft (13 m)
- Draft: 15 ft (4.6 m)
- Installed power: 2 × 550KW GM 8-645 diesel generators; 1 × 500KW Solar Model 101506-2001 gas generator
- Propulsion: CODOG system; 2 × Fairbanks-Morse 38TD8-1/8-12 12-cylinder diesel engines generating 7,000 hp (5,200 kW) and 2 × Pratt & Whittney FT4A-6 gas turbines producing 36,000 hp (27,000 kW)
- Speed: 29 kn (54 km/h; 33 mph) via gas turbines
- Range: 12,500 nmi (23,200 km; 14,400 mi) @ 12 kn (22 km/h; 14 mph) via diesel
- Endurance: 45 days
- Complement: 167 and can carry up to 186
- Sensors & processing systems: AN/SPS-40E Air Search Radar; AN/SPS-73 Surface Search Radar; AN/SQS-35 Active/Passive towed IVDS Sonar; AN/WLR-1H Electronic Support Surveillance Equipment; MK 92 fire-control system; Mk 56 fire-control system; TACAN
- Electronic warfare & decoys: 2 × MK 36 SRBOC launcher system
- Armament: 1 × OTO Melara Mark 75 76 mm/62 caliber naval gun; 2 × 25 mm Mk38; 1 × MK 15 Block 1 20 mm Phalanx CIWS; 6 × .50 caliber machine guns
- Aircraft carried: 1 × MH-65 Helicopter
- Aviation facilities: Flight deck and Hangar

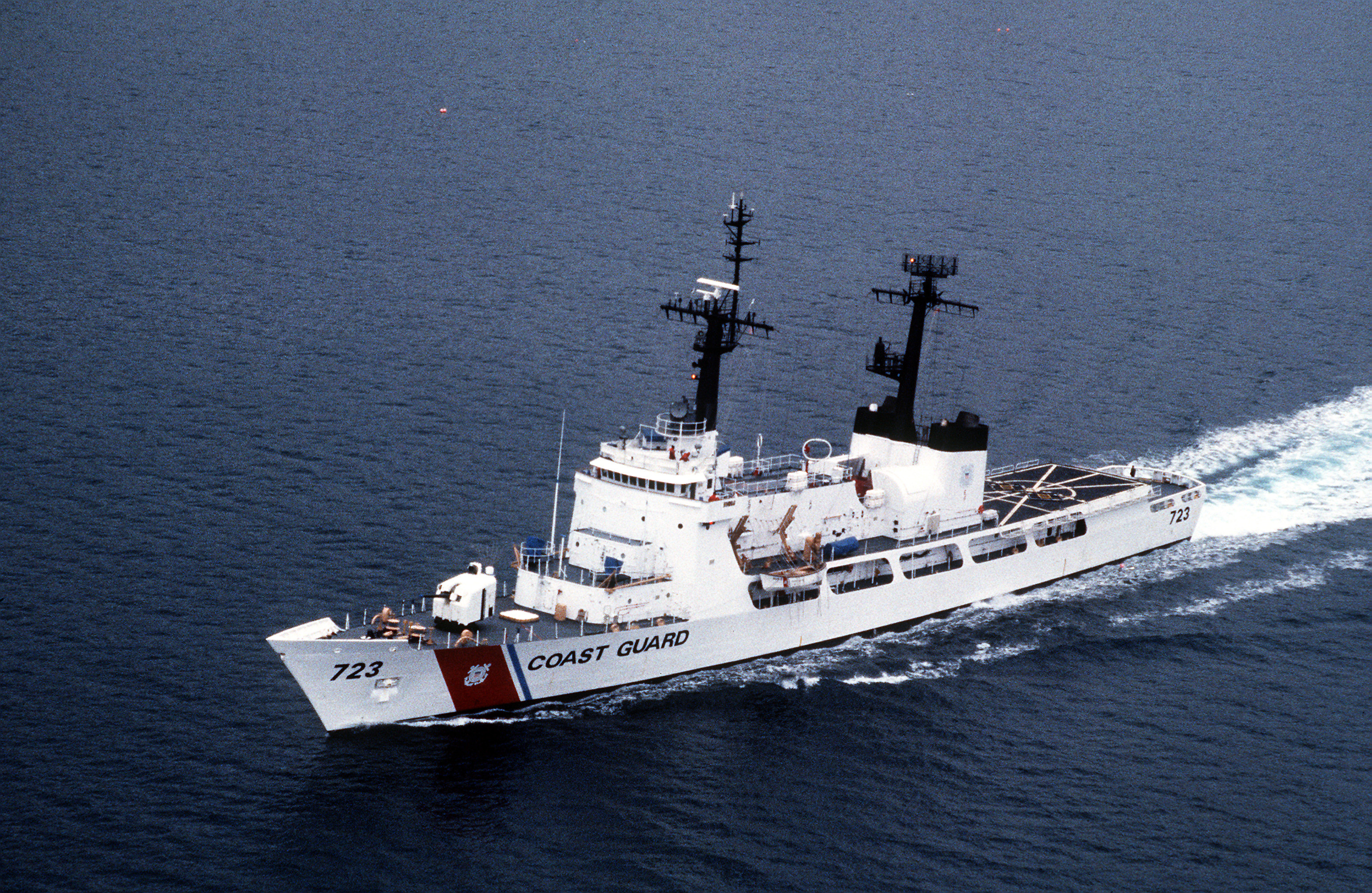
Rush, circa 1985, with the older 5-inch/38 gun, lacking radar and Phalanx CIWS upgrades.

The Hamilton-class cutter was the largest class of vessel in the United States Coast Guard until replaced by the Legend-class cutter, aside from the Polar-class icebreaker. The hull classification symbol is prefixed WHEC. The cutters are called the Hamilton class after their lead ship, or the "Secretary class" because most of the vessels in the class were named for former Secretaries of the Treasury, with the exception of the "Hero-class cutters" Jarvis, Munro and Midgett.

== Design ==
The Hamilton-class cutters were designed to be a highly versatile platform capable of performing various operations, including maritime law enforcement, search and rescue, oceanographic research, and defense operations. Because of their endurance and capabilities, the Hamilton-class cutters commonly deployed with Carrier Battle Groups. They were built with a welded steel hull and aluminum superstructure. The Hamilton-class cutters' hull was designed with a V cross section, and through tank testing the hull was expected to survive and stay afloat longer after suffering damage.

They are powered by a Combined Diesel or Gas (CODOG) system consisting of two diesel engines and two gas turbines, and have controllable-pitch propellers. They were the first U.S. military vessels with combination diesel or gas turbine operation. They were equipped with a helicopter flight deck, retractable hangar, and the facilities to support helicopter deployment.

=== Combat Suite ===
The Hamilton-class cutters were designed and built during the Cold War. Due to this they were originally equipped for anti-submarine warfare (ASW), with the capability to find, track and destroy enemy submarines. When constructed, they were armed with a 5"/38 naval gun, two 81 mm mortars, two .50 caliber machine guns, two MK 10 Hedgehogs, two MK 32 torpedo tube systems, and Nixie torpedo countermeasures.

During the 1980s and 1990s the cutters were modernized under the Fleet Rehabilitation and Modernization (FRAM) program. The FRAM program replaced the 5"/38 gun with the MK 75 76 mm naval gun, upgraded the MK 32 Surface Vessel Torpedo Tubes to Mod 7, installed MK 36 SRBOC launchers and the AN/SLQ-32 electronic warfare suite, and upgraded the cutters' sonar and their air and surface search radars. During the modernization of the cutters the U.S. Navy saw the program as a low cost and easy way to use the cutters as a valuable force multiplier with trained crews that could be called upon during war.

After the completion of FRAM, a joint Navy/USCG board decided further upgrades to the cutters' armament would be implemented, including the installation of Harpoon anti-ship missiles and a MK 15 Phalanx CIWS. The Harpoon anti-ship missiles were fitted to multiple cutters of the class but only one cutter, the USCGC Mellon, ever fired a Harpoon missile, in January 1990. After the collapse of the Soviet Union, the joint Navy/USCG board decided there was no military threat to require the installation of anti-ship missiles and anti-submarine weapons on board cutters, and removed the weapons.

After the removal of the ASW weapons, the Coast Guard installed MK 38 25 mm chain guns on both sides of each cutter. The Hamilton-class cutters were equipped with the Coast Guard's SeaWatch command and control system, which combined navigational, tactical, surveillance and communications into one situational awareness picture, replacing the cutters' outdated Shipboard Command and Control System. Missile defense was handled by the MK 36 launchers and the Phalanx CIWS.

== History ==
The 378-foot WHEC cutter program which created the Hamilton class was initiated in the 1960s. The Hamilton-class cutters were intended to fulfill both the peacetime and wartime requirements of the Coast Guard. Construction at Avondale Shipyards on the lead ship, the Hamilton, began in the 1960s and the cutter was commissioned on March 18, 1967. Originally the Coast Guard planned to build 36 Hamilton-class cutters. Due to the termination of the ocean stations program, they reduced the number of planned cutters to 12.

During the Vietnam War multiple Hamilton-class cutters supported Operation Market Time. The cutters patrolled the South Vietnamese coastline, boarded and inspected suspected North Vietnamese and Viet Cong vessels, conducted naval gunfire support missions, and provided medical assistance to Vietnamese civilians. Throughout their service Hamilton-class participated in other conflicts and military operations such as Operation Urgent Fury, Operation Vigilant Sentinel, Operation Deny Flight, and Operation Iraqi Freedom.

Beginning in the 1980s and ending in 1992, the entire class was modernized through the FRAM program. The program included updates and changes to the cutters weapons, sensors, the addition of a helicopter hangar, engine overhauls, and improved habitability.

Cutters Midgett and Munro were renamed to John Midgett and Douglas Munro to allow the new Legend-class cutters Midgett and Munro to assume the former names of the two Hamilton-class cutters.

In March 2007, cutters Hamilton and Sherman intercepted the Panamanian-flagged fishing vessel Gatun in international waters and recovered 20 metric tons (20 long tons) of cocaine, with an estimated street value of $600 million retail. The seizure was at that time the largest at-sea drug bust in US history.

== Ships in class ==
Ship Name	Hull No.	Builder	Laid down	Launched	Commissioned	Decommissioned	Fate
Hamilton	WHEC-715	Avondale Shipyards	January 1965	18 December 1965	18 March 1967	28 March 2011	Transferred to the Philippine Navy on 13 May 2011 as BRP Gregorio del Pilar (PS-15)
Dallas	WHEC-716	Avondale Shipyards	7 February 1966	1 October 1966	11 March 1968	30 March 2012	Transferred to the Philippine Navy on 22 May 2012 as BRP Ramon Alcaraz (PS-16)
Mellon	WHEC-717	Avondale Shipyards	25 July 1966	11 February 1967	9 January 1968	20 August 2020	Transferred to Vietnam Coast Guard on 19 June 2025 as CSB 8022
Chase	WHEC-718	Avondale Shipyards	26 October 1966	20 May 1967	11 March 1968	29 March 2011	Transferred to Nigerian Navy on 13 May 2011 as the NNS Thunder (F90)
Boutwell	WHEC-719	Avondale Shipyards	12 December 1966	17 June 1967	24 June 1968	16 March 2016	Transferred to the Philippine Navy on 21 July 2016 as BRP Andres Bonifacio (PS-17)
Sherman	WHEC-720	Avondale Shipyards	25 January 1967	3 September 1968	23 August 1968	29 March 2018	Transferred to the Sri Lanka Navy on 27 August 2018, recommissioned 6 June 2019 as SLNS Gajabahu (P626)
Gallatin	WHEC-721	Avondale Shipyards	17 April 1967	18 November 1967	20 December 1968	31 March 2014	Transferred to Nigerian Navy on 7 May 2014 as NNS Okpabana (F93)
Morgenthau	WHEC-722	Avondale Shipyards	17 July 1967	10 February 1968	10 March 1969	18 April 2017	Transferred to Vietnam Coast Guard on 25 May 2017 as CSB 8020
Rush	WHEC-723	Avondale Shipyards	23 October 1967	16 November 1968	3 July 1969	3 February 2015	Transferred to the Bangladesh Navy on 6 May 2015 as BNS Somudra Avijan
Douglas Munro	WHEC-724	Avondale Shipyards	18 February 1970	5 December 1970	27 September 1971	24 April 2021	Transferred to the Sri Lanka Navy on 26 October 2021. Commissioned on 20 November 2022 as SLNS Vijayabahu (P627).
Jarvis	WHEC-725	Avondale Shipyards	9 September 1970	24 April 1971	4 August 1972	2 October 2012	Transferred to the Bangladesh Navy on 23 May 2013 as BNS Somudra Joy
John Midgett	WHEC-726	Avondale Shipyards	5 April 1971	4 September 1971	17 March 1972	June 2020	Transferred to Vietnam Coast Guard on 1 June 2021 as CSB 8021

== Operators ==
- Bangladesh Navy
- Nigerian Navy
- Philippine Navy
- Sri Lanka Navy
- Vietnam Coast Guard

=== Former ===
- United States Coast Guard

== See also ==
- Treasury-class cutter
