= USCGC Gallatin =

USCGC Gallatin has been the name of more than one ship of the United States Coast Guard:

- USCGC Gallatin (1925), a patrol boat in commission in the Coast Guard from 1926 to 1935
- USCGC Gallatin (WHEC-721), a high endurance cutter in commission in the Coast Guard from 1968 to 2014 and in the Nigerian Navy since 2017

== See also ==
- USRC Gallatin, for United States Revenue Cutter Service ships
