= Gallatin High School =

Gallatin High School may refer to the following schools in the United States:

- Gallatin High School (Illinois) in Junction, Illinois
- Gallatin County High School (Kentucky) in Warsaw, Kentucky
- Gallatin County High School (Montana) in Bozeman, Montana
- Gallatin High School (Bozeman, Montana)
- Gallatin High School (Tennessee) in Gallatin, Tennessee

== See also ==
- Gallatin College (disambiguation)
- Gallatin School (Uniontown, Pennsylvania)
