= USRC Gallatin =

USRC Gallatin was the name of more than one ship of the United States Revenue Cutter Service:

- USRC Gallatin (1815), a cutter in commission from 1815 or 1816 until ca. 1824
- USRC Gallatin (1830), a cutter in commission from 1830 to 1840 and from 1848 to 1849
- USRC Gallatin (1871), also known as USRC Albert Gallatin, a cutter in commission from 1874 to 1892

== See also ==
- USS Gallatin (1807), a cutter in commission with the Revenue Cutter Service from 1807; sunk in 1813
- USCGC Gallatin, United States Coast Guard ships
