= BNS Somudra Joy =

Bangladeshi naval frigate

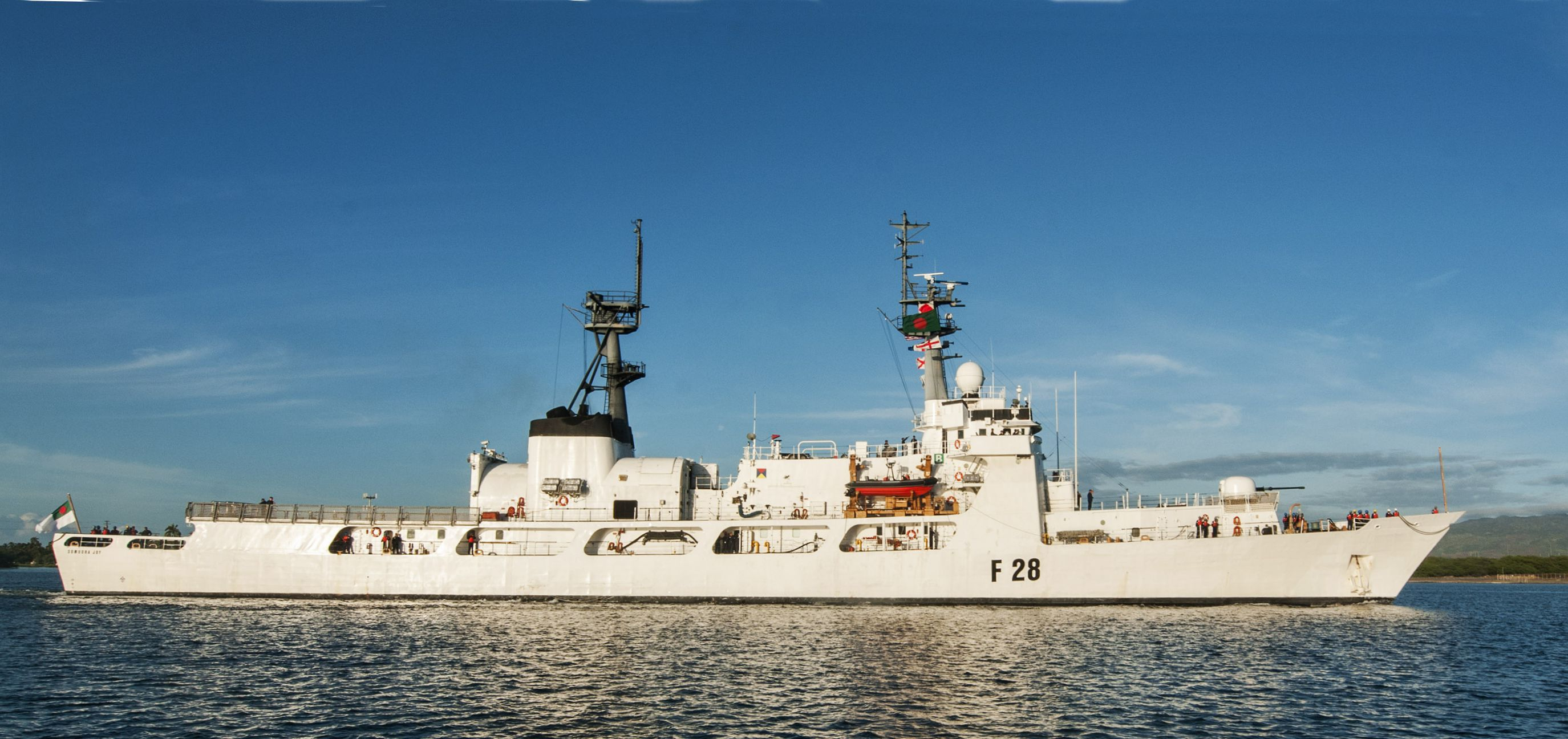
- Somudra Joy at Pearl Harbor, Hawaii in 2013

History

Bangladesh
- Name: Somudra Joy
- Builder: Avondale Shipyards
- Laid down: 9 September 1970
- Launched: 24 April 1971
- Acquired: 23 May 2013
- Commissioned: 23 December 2013
- Home port: Chattogram
- Identification: MMSI number: 405000133; Callsign: S3VS; Pennant Number: F-28
- Nickname(s): BNS SJ
- Status: Active

General characteristics
- Class & type: Hamilton-class cutter/ patrol frigate
- Displacement: 3,250 tones
- Length: 378 ft (115.2 m)
- Beam: 43 ft (13.1 m)
- Draught: 15 ft (4.6 m) (4.6 m)
- Propulsion: CODOG: 2 × FM diesel engines; 2 × PW gas turbines
- Speed: 29 knots (54 km/h; 33 mph)
- Range: 16,000 nmi (30,000 km; 18,000 mi)
- Endurance: 45 days
- Complement: 178 (21 officers and 157 enlisted)
- Sensors & processing systems: AN/SPS-40 air-search radar, MK 92 FCS
- Electronic warfare & decoys: 1 × Mark 36 SRBOC
- Armament: 1 × OTO Melara 76 mm main gun, forward
- Aircraft carried: 1 × hangar

BNS Somudra Joy (Note: The name has been widely, but incorrectly, reported as Somudro Joy or other variants) is one of the two largest ships of the Bangladesh Navy along with her sister ship BNS Somudra Avijan. Although originally a high endurance cutter the Bangladesh Navy reclassified the ship as a frigate. They acquired the ship from the United States under Excess Defense Articles. Currently she is being used as a training ship for naval cadets.

== History ==
From 1972 to 2012 the ship was known as USCGC Jarvis and served the United States Coast Guard as a high endurance cutter. She was decommissioned on 30 March 2012 and was acquired by Bangladesh under the Foreign Assistance Act as an Excess Defense Article. A team of US Coast Guard personnel visited Bangladesh in February 2013. The first group of Bangladesh Navy personnel, consisting of 7 officers and 13 sailors, left Bangladesh in February to start training on board Jarvis on 13 March 2013. She was officially handed over to the Bangladesh Navy on 23 May 2013. The Ship was dedicated as a training ship from 24 March 2016 for training naval cadets, midshipman and sub-lieutenants.

== Career ==
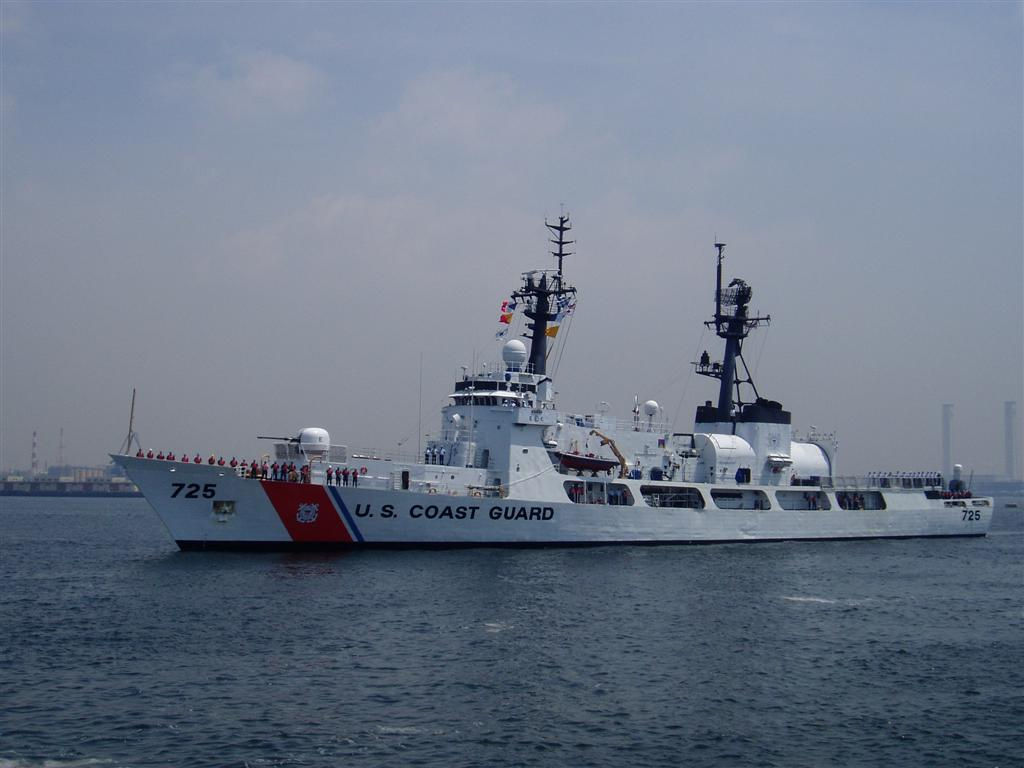
BNS Somudra Joy had been used by U.S. Coast Guard as USCGC Jarvis before it was sent to Chattogram.

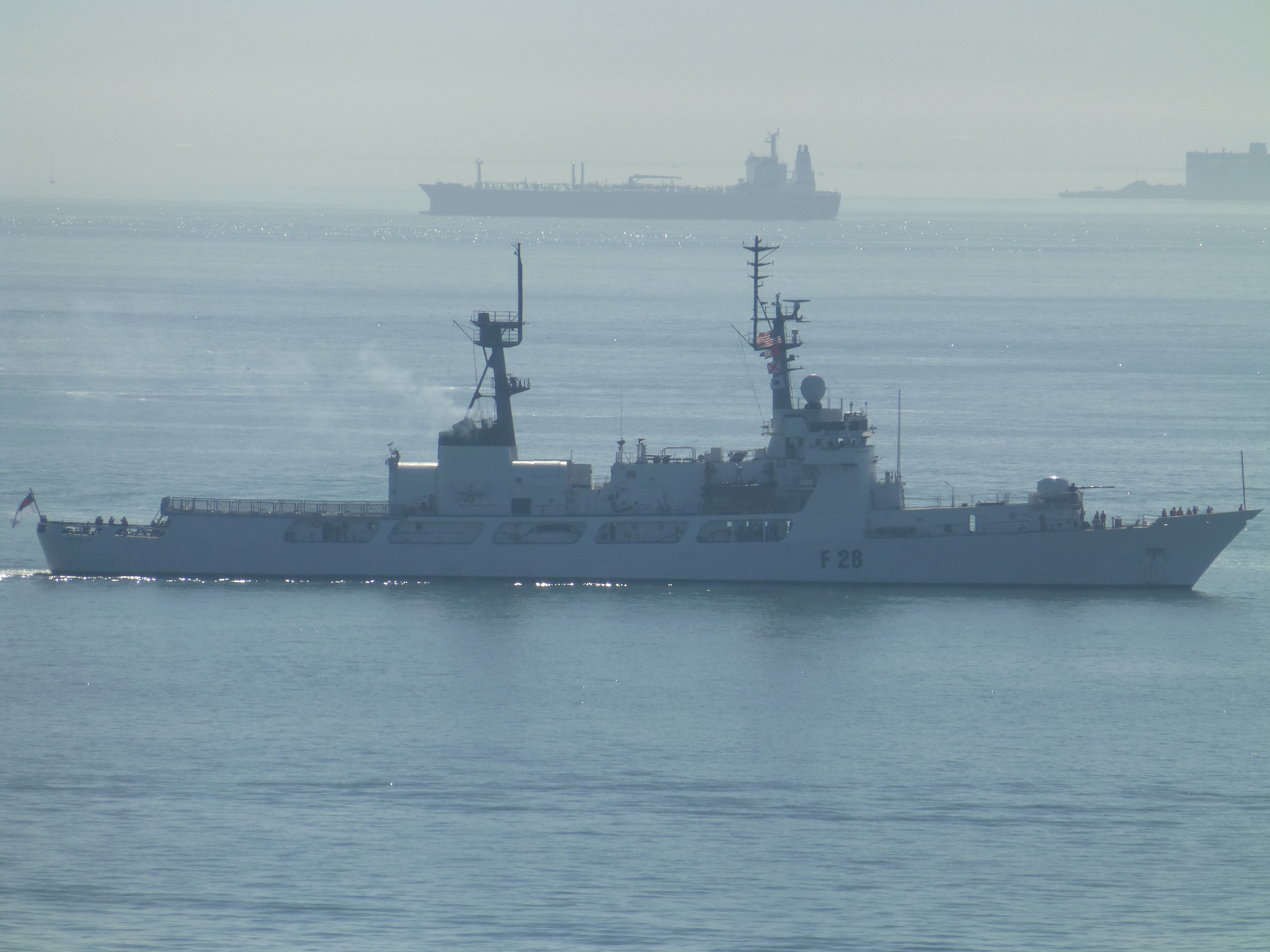
BNS Somudra Joy on her way to Chattogram from USA.

BNS Somudra Joy arrived at her new homeport of Chattogram on 13 December 2013 and was commissioned on 23 December 2013. The ship is currently serving with Commanding Commodore BN Flotilla (COMBAN).

During her transit to Bangladesh from the United States, she was diverted to the Philippines to distribute emergency aid for the victims of Typhoon Haiyan on behalf of Government of Bangladesh. She arrived there on 29 November 2013.

BNS Somudra Joy was sent to Maldives on 9 December 2014, to aid in the water crisis that took place in capital Malé on 8 December 2014. She carried 100 tonnes of drinking water and five desalination plants there.

On 23 April 2015, she left for Qatar to join the multinational maritime exercise, Exercise Ferocious Falcon-2015. The ship took part in Cooperation Afloat Readiness and Training(CARAT), an annual bilateral exercise with United States Navy, in 2015.

Somudra Joy left Chattogram on 30 January 2016 on a seven-day visit to India to join International Fleet Review 2016. The fleet review held in Visakhapatnam, India where 52 countries participated.

Somudra Joy, with sister ship BNS Somudra Avijan left Chattogram for India and Sri Lanka on a goodwill visit on 18 September 2016. The ships were at Port Blair, India from 21 to 25 September and at Colombo port, Sri Lanka from 29 September to 4 October. They returned Chattogram on 9 October 2016.

Somudra Joy participated in ASEAN International Fleet Review 2017 held at Pattaya beach of Thailand on 21 November 2017. She stayed in Thailand from 16 November to 21 November 2017 to participate in the exercise. On the way to Thailand, the ship visited Lumut Port of Malaysia from 8 November to 11 November 2017. The ship also visited Langkawi port of Malaysia on her way back home from 27 November to 30 November 2017.

The ship left Chattogram on a training tour on 1 September 2018. She visited the Visakhapatnam Port of India from 4 September to 8 September 2018 and Port of Colombo in Sri Lanka from 12 September to 16 September 2018. She returned home on 20 September 2018.

Somudra Joy participated in Langkawi International Maritime and Aerospace Exhibition(LIMA)-2019, held from 26 to 30 March. She left Chattogram to take part in the event on 21 March 2019. The ship came back home on 20 April 2019.

On 1 September 2019, Samudra Joy left Chattogram for Sri Lanka and India on a training visit. She was at the port of Colombo, Sri Lanka from 7 September to 10 September 2019 and at the port of Visakhapatnam of India 14 September to 17 September 2019. She came back home on 19 September 2019.

In January 2025, the ship left Chittagong to attend the exercise Aman-25 held in Karachi, Pakistan from 7 to 11 February, 2025. On its way to Karachi, the ship will also pay goodwill visits to Colombo in Sri Lanka and Male in Maldives.

On 31 January 2025, the Somudra Joy arrived at the Port of Colombo, Sri Lanka, for an official visit under the command of Captain Md. Shahriar Alam. The vessel departed the island following the conclusion of the visit on 2 February 2025.

== See also ==
- List of active ships of the Bangladesh Navy
