= East Wood affair =

Piracy incident (1993)

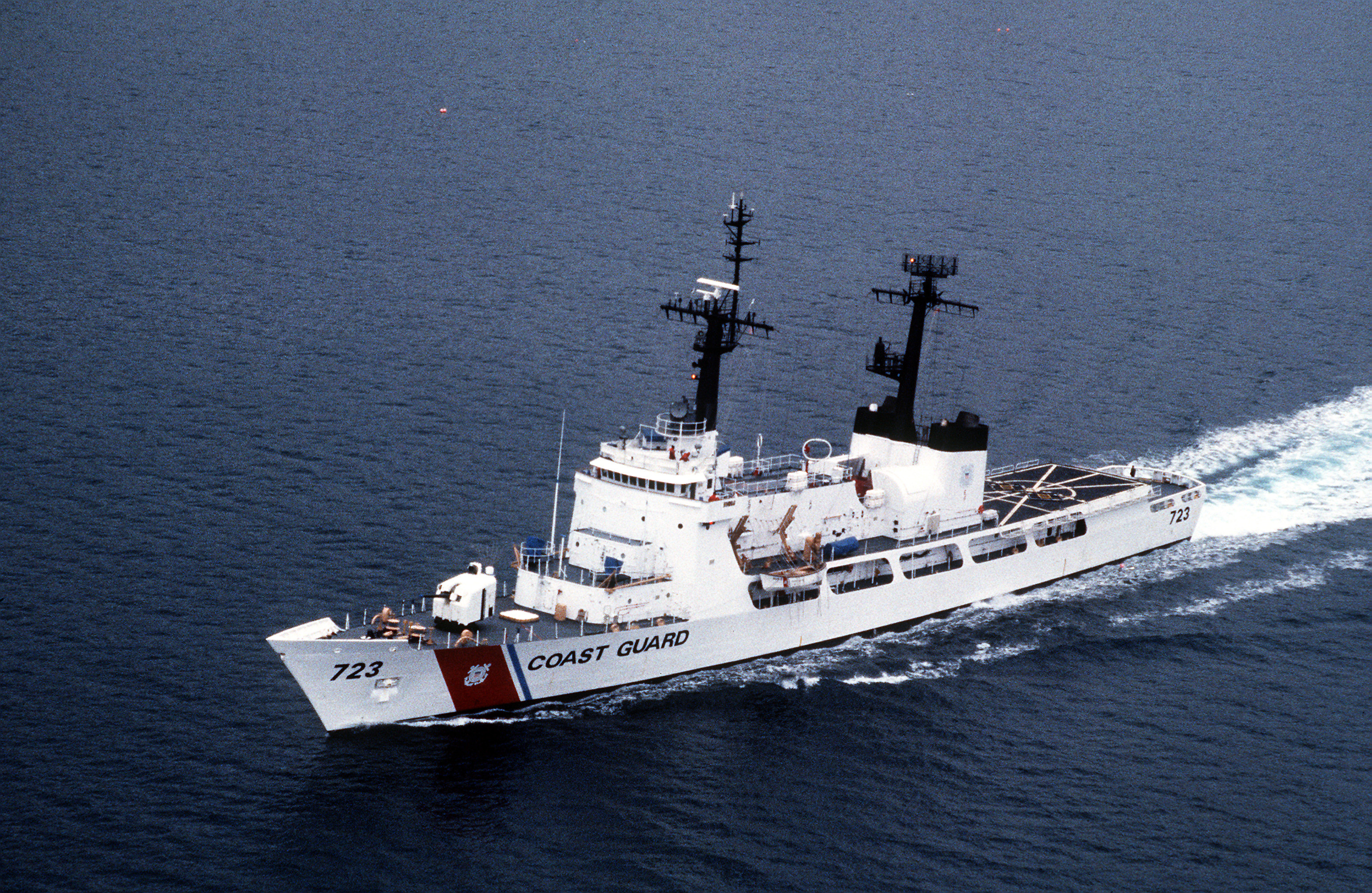
USCGC Rush

The East Wood affair was an incident of piracy in early 1993 aboard the cargo ship East Wood (also Eastwood), after Chinese illegal immigrants took control of the vessel. The vessel was eventually taken back by her crew. More than 500 undocumented Chinese nationals were being transported in one of the largest efforts to smuggle Chinese into the United States in recent times.

== Radio messages ==
On January 27, 1993 a distress message went out from the freighter that it had been hijacked by an armed crew member after it had left from Hong Kong to Taiwan. On February 7 the US Coast Guard cutter USCGC Rush, after gaining permission from the Panamanian government (the ship was registered as a Panamanian vessel), boarded with armed sailors but by then the mutiny had already been put down. They found signs of violence and discovered 527 illegal immigrants from Fujian and Guangdong provinces, China. The only weapons were pocket knives and machetes, and two crew members were missing.

== Aftermath ==
The ship was escorted to the Marshall Islands, breaking down twice, and arrived at Kwajalein where the immigrants stayed for 20 days to recover their health before being returned to China. The Indonesian crew members were flown back to Indonesia.

== See also ==
- Golden Venture
