= USS Gallatin (APA-169) =

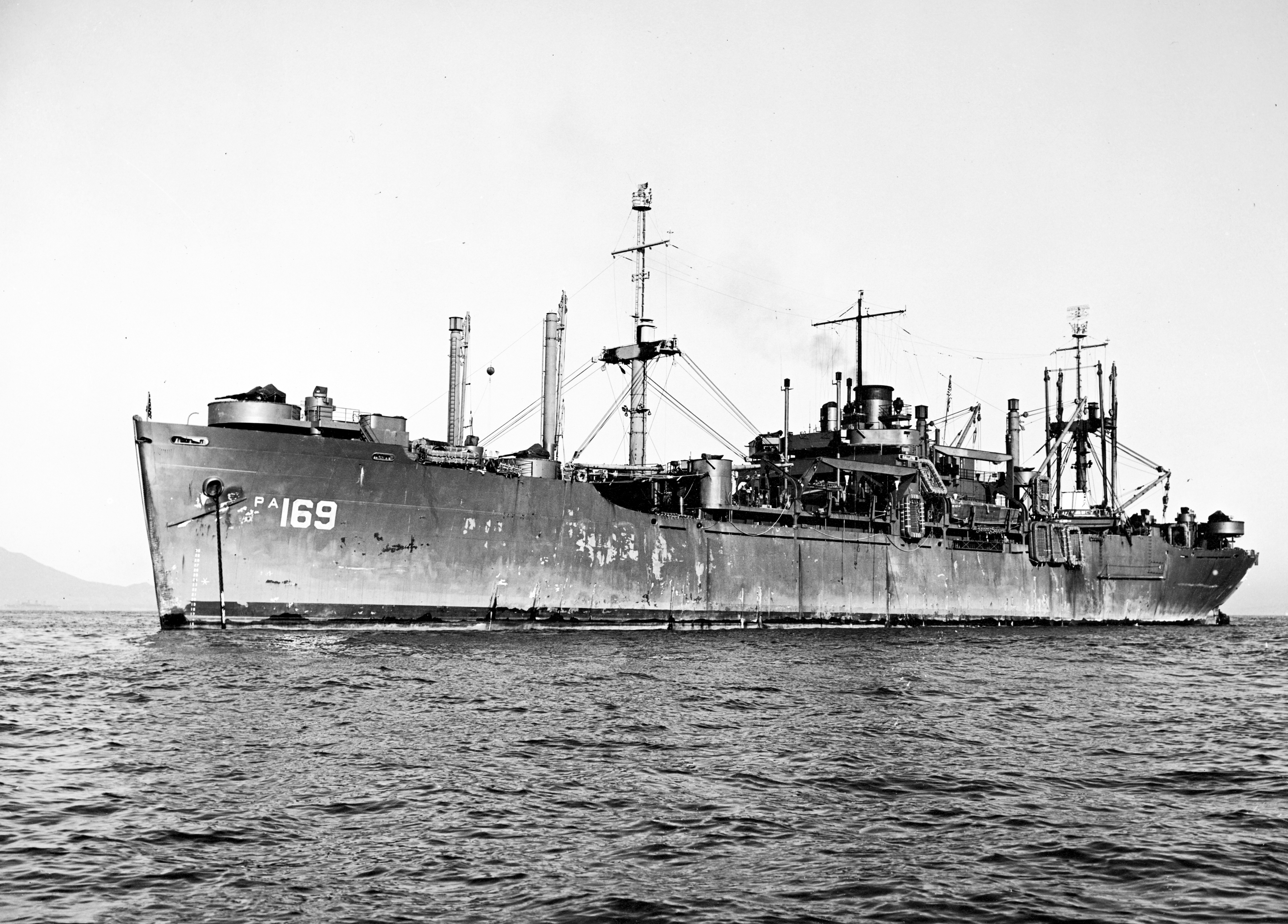
- USS Gallatin (APA-169) at anchor in San Francisco Bay, late 1945 or early '46

History

United States
- Name: USS Gallatin
- Namesake: Gallatin County, Illinois; Gallatin County, Kentucky; Gallatin County, Montana
- Ordered: as type VC2-S-AP5
- Laid down: 13 August 1944
- Launched: 17 October 1944
- Acquired: 15 November 1944
- Commissioned: 15 November 1944
- Decommissioned: 23 April 1946
- Stricken: 8 May 1946
- Fate: Sold for scrapping in Spain, 17 September 1983

General characteristics
- Displacement: 12,450 tons (full load)
- Length: 455 ft 0 in (138.68 m)
- Beam: 62 ft 0 in (18.90 m)
- Draught: 24 ft 0 in (7.32 m)
- Speed: 19 knots
- Complement: 536
- Armament: one 5 in (130 mm) gun mount, twelve 40 mm gun mounts, ten 20 mm gun mounts

USS Gallatin (APA-169/LKA-169) was a Haskell-class attack transport acquired by the U.S. Navy during World War II for the task of transporting troops to and from combat areas.

== World War II service ==
The second ship to be named Gallatin by the Navy was built under United States Maritime Commission contract by the Oregon Shipbuilding Co., Portland, Oregon; launched 17 October 1944 sponsored by Mrs. Loran T. King of Portland; acquired by the Navy on a loan-charter basis 15 November 1944 and commissioned the same day at Astoria, Oregon.

=== Pacific Ocean operations ===
After shakedown training out of San Pedro, Los Angeles, Gallatin departed San Diego, California, 18 January 1945 with more than a thousand troops plus cargo. In the ensuing months she carried passengers and military cargo to ports throughout the Pacific Ocean, supporting the final blows which forced Japan to surrender. She visited Hawaii; the Marshall Islands; the New Hebrides; New Caledonia; the Philippines; New Guinea; and the Admiralty Islands.

=== End-of-war operations ===
She sailed from the Philippines for the U.S. West Coast and arrived San Francisco, California, with nearly 1,500 weary war veterans 10 August 1945. Eight days later she headed west again with as many troops for garrison duty at Lingayen Gulf, Philippine Islands. During October she steamed to Japan with vehicles, stores, and advance elements of the Army's 25th Division which she landed at Honshū as occupation forces.

== Bringing the troops back home ==
Assigned to "Operation Magic Carpet" duty, Gallatin carried nearly 2,000 marines and other military veterans home from the Philippines and Hawaii. She reached San Diego, California, with her veteran passengers 20 November 1945, and then made another "Magic-Carpet" voyage to the Philippines which terminated at San Diego 25 January 1946.

== Post-war decommissioning ==
After transiting the Panama Canal, she decommissioned at Newport News, Virginia, 23 April 1946; was returned to War Shipping Administration (WSA) the following day; and was placed in the National Defense Reserve Fleet, James River, Virginia. She was struck from the Navy List on 8 May 1946. In 1969 she was classified "general cargo" as opposed to "troop transport" and was redesignated LKA-169. Returned to the Maritime Commission in April 1946 and stricken from the Navy List in May, she was in the reserve fleet until sold for scrapping in September 1983.
