= NNS Okpabana =

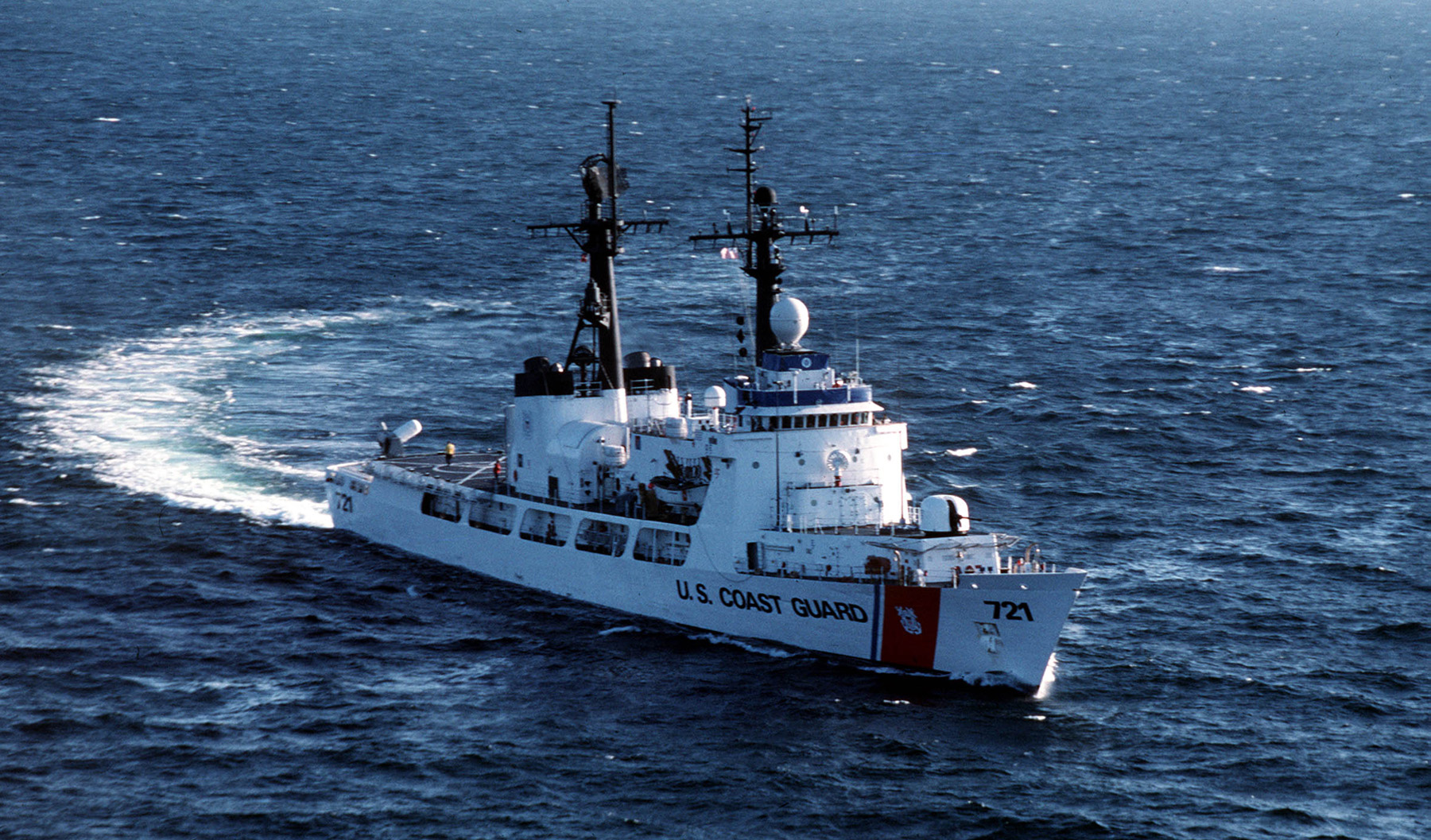
- USCGC Gallatin (WHEC-721)

History

United States
- Name: USCGC Gallatin
- Namesake: Albert Gallatin
- Builder: Avondale Shipyards
- Laid down: 17 April 1967
- Launched: 18 November 1967
- Commissioned: 20 December 1968
- Decommissioned: 31 March 2014
- Home port: Charleston, South Carolina
- Identification: MMSI number: 367271000; Callsign: NJOR
- Motto: Virtus Cum Ingenio
- Fate: Transferred to Nigerian Navy
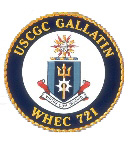
- Badge: Crest of USCGC Gallatin

Nigeria
- Name: NNS Okpabana
- Acquired: 7 May 2014
- Commissioned: 2017
- Identification: MMSI number: 657737000; Callsign: F93
- Status: Active

General characteristics
- Class & type: Hamilton-class high endurance cutter
- Displacement: 3,250 tons
- Length: 378 ft (115 m)
- Beam: 43 ft (13 m)
- Draught: 15 ft (4.6 m)
- Propulsion: CODOG: 2 × FM diesel engines; 2 × PW gas turbines; 2 × controllable pitch propellers
- Speed: 29 knots (54 km/h)
- Range: 14,000 mi (23,000 km)
- Endurance: 45 days
- Complement: 167 personnel
- Sensors & processing systems: AN/SPS-40 air-search radar
- Armament: Otobreda 76 mm gun; Phalanx CIWS

NNS Okpabana is a Hamilton-class high endurance cutter which formerly served with the U.S. Coast Guard as USCGC Gallatin (WHEC-721). Built at Avondale Shipyards near New Orleans, Louisiana, Gallatin was named for Albert Gallatin, the fourth and longest serving United States Secretary of the Treasury. Gallatin completed her final patrol 11 December 2013 and was decommissioned in 2014 before being transferred to the Nigerian Navy.

== Construction ==
Gallatin was laid down at Avondale Shipyards on 17 April 1967, as the seventh ship of her class. She was launched on 18 November 1967 and was commissioned on 20 December 1968.

== Design ==
The ship is designed as a high endurance cutter. Her cruising range of 9,600 nautical miles (17,800 km) at 20 knots (37 km/h)), and an 80-foot (24 m) flight deck, capable of handling helicopters, make the ship an ideal platform for extended patrol missions. Gallantin was one of the first naval vessels built with a combined diesel or gas (CODOG) turbine propulsion plant. Her engineering plant includes two 3,500 horsepower (2,600 kW) diesel engines, and two 18,000 horsepower (13,000 kW) gas turbines, which can achieve a top speed of 29 knots (54 km/h). Two 13-foot (3.96 m) diameter controllable pitch propellers, combined with a retractable and rotatable bow propulsion unit, give the ship high maneuverability.

The ship's capabilities are enhanced by advanced air search and surface search radars, including the AN/SPS-73 digital surface radar system that incorporates a state of the art computerized collision avoidance system. The ship uses the Shipboard Command and Control System (SCCS), which employs a network of computers including large screen displays and a dedicated satellite network for communications. A closed circuit TV system enables the Commanding Officer to monitor flight deck operations, machinery conditions, towing, damage control, and related activities from the bridge.

== History ==
Gallatin's missions included enforcement of all U.S. maritime laws and treaties, fisheries conservation, marine pollution response, defense readiness, and search and rescue. Gallatin served with the United States Coast Guard until 31 March 2014, when she was decommissioned. On 7 May, she was transferred to the Nigerian Navy and renamed Okpabana.

== Nigerian service ==
On 19 February 2016 NNS Okpabana recaptured the pirated tanker Maximus in the Gulf of Guinea, killing one pirate and capturing six others. On 7 October 2020 she performed training exercises with the USS Hershel "Woody" Williams.

== Photos ==
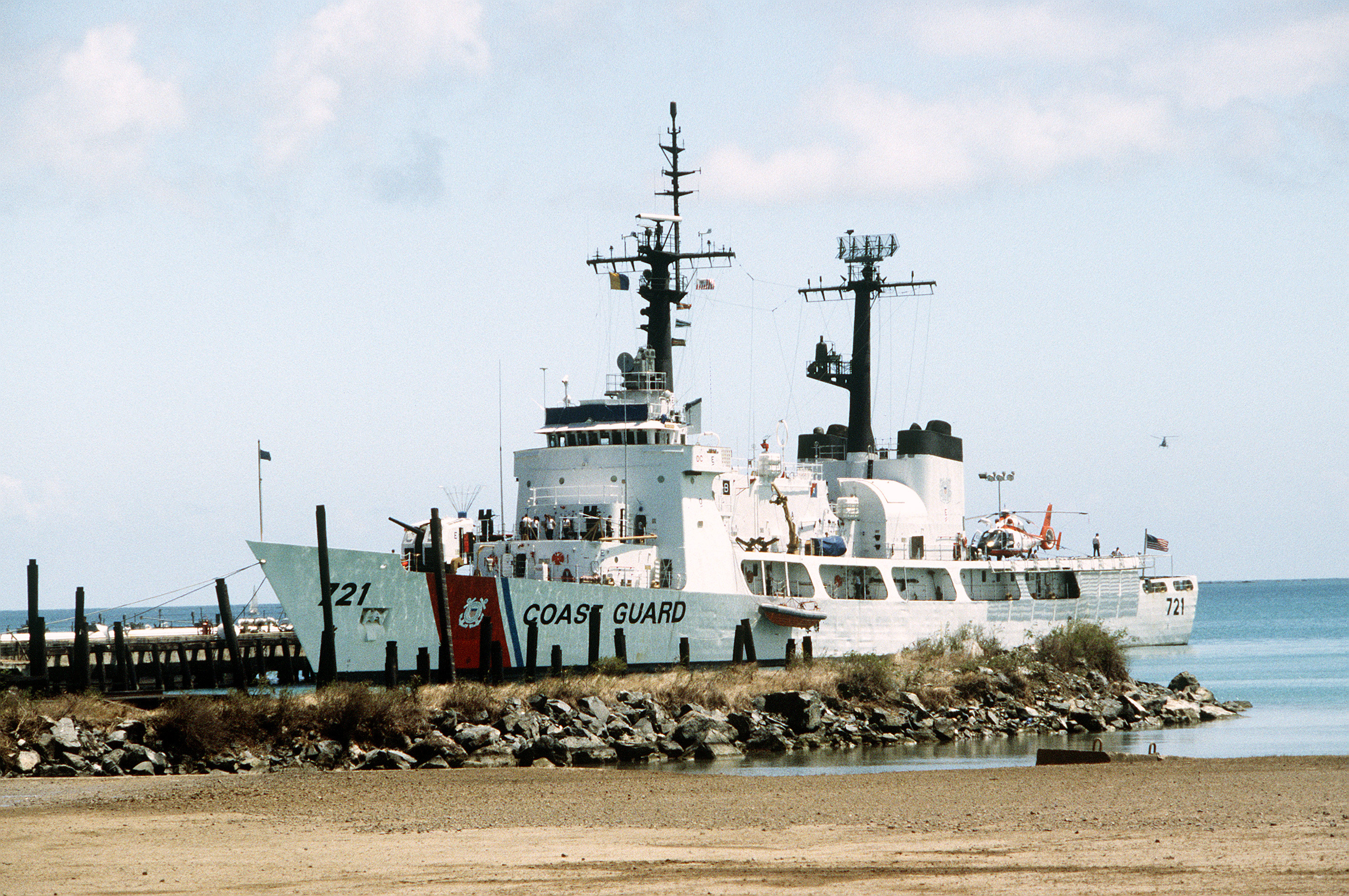
USCGC Gallatin (WHEC-721)

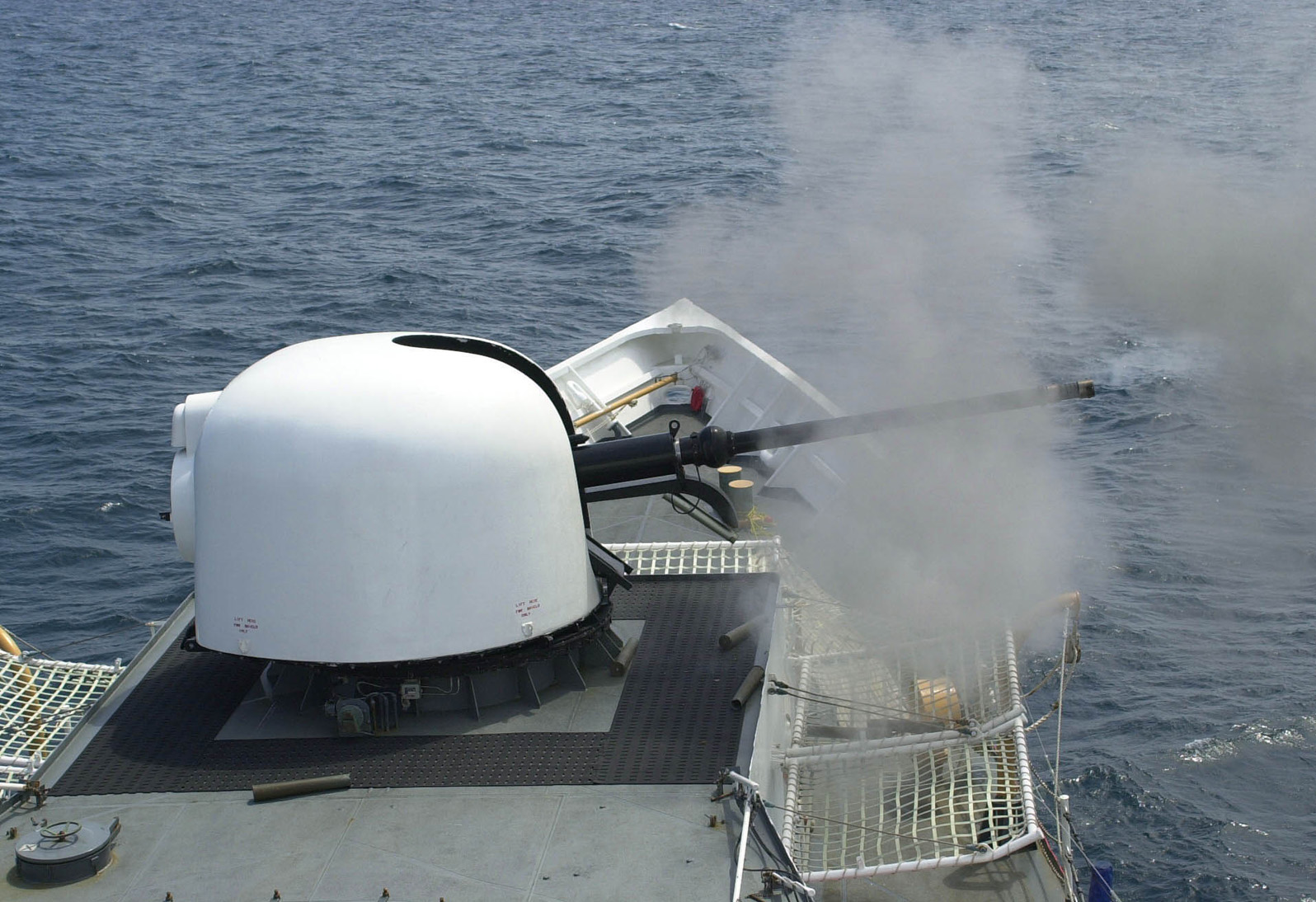
Gallatin fires her 76 mm Mk 75 gun during a live-fire exercise
