= USCGC Jarvis =

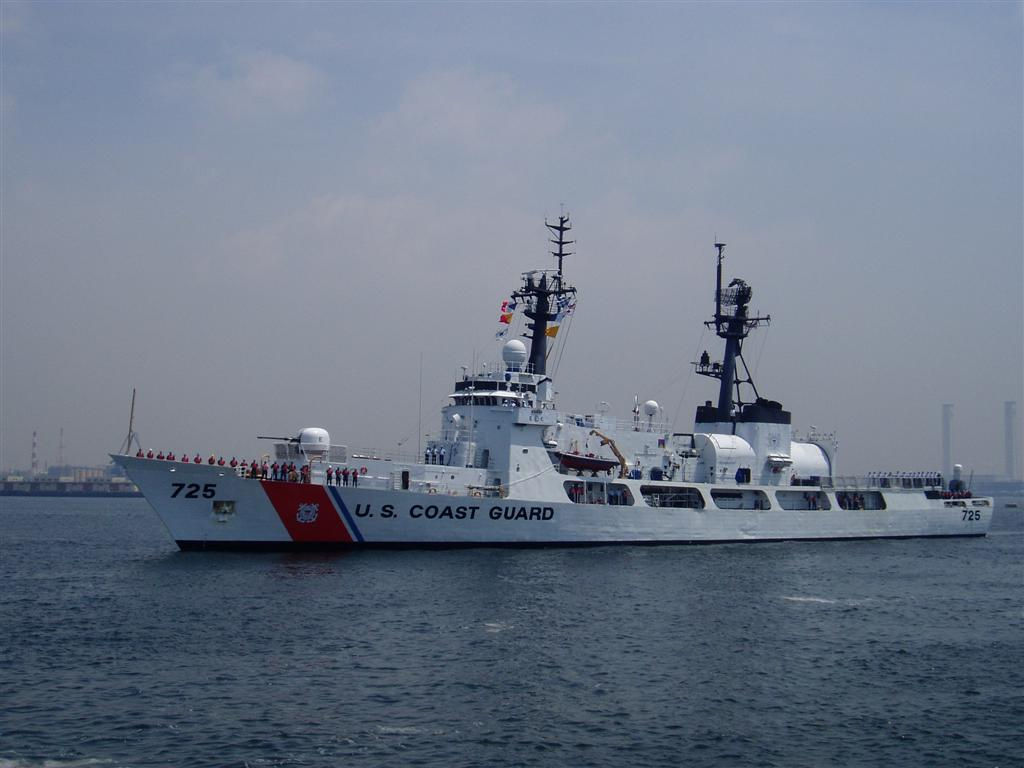
- USCGC Jarvis (WHEC-725)

History

United States
- Namesake: Captain David H. Jarvis, U.S. Revenue Cutter Service
- Builder: Avondale Shipyards
- Cost: US$14,065,811
- Laid down: 9 September 1970
- Launched: 24 April 1971
- Commissioned: 4 August 1972
- Recommissioned: December 1992
- Decommissioned: 2 October 2012
- Identification: MMSI number: 367280000; Callsign: NAQD
- Motto: Dedicare ad excellentia; (Dedicated to Excellence)
- Fate: Transferred to Bangladesh Navy as BNS Somudra Joy on 23 May 2013

General characteristics
- Class & type: High endurance cutter
- Displacement: 3,300 tons
- Length: 378 ft (115 m)
- Beam: 43 ft 8 in (13.31 m)
- Draught: 15 ft (4.6 m)
- Propulsion: CODOG: 2 × FM diesel engines; 2 × PW gas turbines
- Speed: 29 knots
- Range: 16,000 miles
- Endurance: 45 days
- Complement: 178 personnel (21 officers and 157 enlisted)
- Sensors & processing systems: AN/SPS-40 air-search radar, MK 92 FCS
- Armament: Otobreda 76 mm, Phalanx CIWS

USCGC Jarvis (WHEC-725) was a Hamilton-class cutter of the United States Coast Guard. She was launched on 24 April 1971 and commissioned on 4 August 1971 homeported at Honolulu, Hawaii; served on Ocean Station November and fisheries patrols and search and rescue missions in the Bering Sea. She received a FRAM upgrade in 1990–2. Jarvis was decommissioned on 2 October 2012 and in January 2013 the Coast Guard announced that she would be transferred to the Bangladesh Navy late that year. She was commissioned as BNS Somudra Joy (F-28) on 23 December 2013.

== History ==
The USCGC Jarvis was named for David H. Jarvis, a hero of the United States Revenue Cutter Service. During the harsh winter of 1897–1898, Lieutenant Jarvis of the U.S. Revenue Cutter Bear led the Overland Relief Expedition to bring needed food to 265 whalers whose ships had been stranded in the ice off the northern coast of Alaska. The high endurance cutter was launched 24 April 1971 at Avondale Shipyard near New Orleans, Louisiana and was commissioned 4 August 1972 at Honolulu, Hawaii, where she would be based for the rest of her career. During her first Alaska patrol, she was caught in a heavy storm and ran aground in the Bering Sea next to the Aleutian Islands. She received a $55 million Fleet Rehabilitation and Modernization Program (FRAM) upgrade at Todd Pacific Shipyards in Seattle, Washington between July 1990 and December 1992. Jarvis completed her final cruise in late September 2012, and was removed from active service the following week.

== Grounding Incident ==
During a severe storm in November 1972 off the coast of Alaska along the Aluetian Islands, the USCGC Jarvis ran aground after dragging anchor and started to take on water. The ship was holed, but soon repaired when more violent storm caused further leaking and the engine room to fill with water disabling the engines. Back in heavy seas, the ship experienced severe rolls at one time experience a sixty-degree roll. "At 7:04 pm, for one of the few times in Coast Guard history a "MAYDAY" call for help would come from a Coast Guard vessel." A Japanese fishing trawler arrived just in time to tow them to safety before it crashed into rocks, towing them to Dutch Harbor where the ship was repaired and then disembarked. No crew members were lost.

== Transfer to Bangladesh Navy ==
In January 2013 Admiral Cecil D. Haney, commander of the U.S. Pacific Fleet, announced that Jarvis would be transferred to Bangladesh in mid-2013. The Bangladeshis hope to convert the BNS Somudra Joy into a guided missile frigate. A team of U.S. Coast Guard personnel visited Bangladesh in February 2013. The first group of Bangladesh Navy personnel, consisting of 7 officers and 13 sailors, left Bangladesh in February to start training aboard Jarvis on 13 March 2013. She was officially handed over to the Bangladesh Navy on 23 May 2013. During her transit to Bangladesh she was diverted to the Philippines to distribute emergency aid for the victims of Typhoon Haiyan, arriving there on 29 November 2013. She arrived at her new home Chittagong on 13 December 2013 and was commissioned on 23 December 2013.

== Notes ==
Citations

References used

- Craig, Steven J. (2019). All Present and Accounted For: The 1972 Alaska Grounding of the U.S. Coast Guard Cutter Jarvis and the Heroic Efforts that Saved the Ship. Hellgate Press. ASIN B082LTW2C4.
- "The USCGC Jarvis survived a brutal storm in 1972. A St. Clair man lived through it". The Times Herald.
- "US to continue maritime partnership". News. bdnews24.com. 15 January 2013.
- "US hands over naval ship". News. bdnews24.com. 24 May 2013.
- "Bangladesh sends aid to Philippines". Tribune Online Report. Dhaka Tribune. 25 November 2013.
- "378-foot High Endurance Cutter (WHEC)". Aircraft, Boats, and Cutters: Cutters. U.S. Coast Guard Historian's Office.
- King, Irving H. (1996). The Coast Guard Expands, 1865–1915: New Roles, New Frontiers. Naval Institute Press, Annapolis, Maryland. ISBN 978-1-55750-458-6.
- Scheina, Robert L. (1990). U.S. Coast Guard Cutters & Craft, 1946–1990. Naval Institute Press, Annapolis, Maryland. ISBN 978-0-87021-719-7.
