= Gallatin (surname) =

Gallatin is a surname. Notable people with the surname include:

- Albert Gallatin (1761–1849), Swiss-American ethnologist, linguist, politician, founder of New York University, diplomat, and United States Secretary of the Treasury
- Albert Eugene Gallatin (1881–1952), New York art collector, author, and artist; great-grandson of Albert Gallatin
- Harry Gallatin (1927–2015), basketball player and coach
- James Gallatin (1796–1876), president of Gallatin National Bank, son of Albert Gallatin
