= NNS Thunder =

1967 Hamilton-class cutter

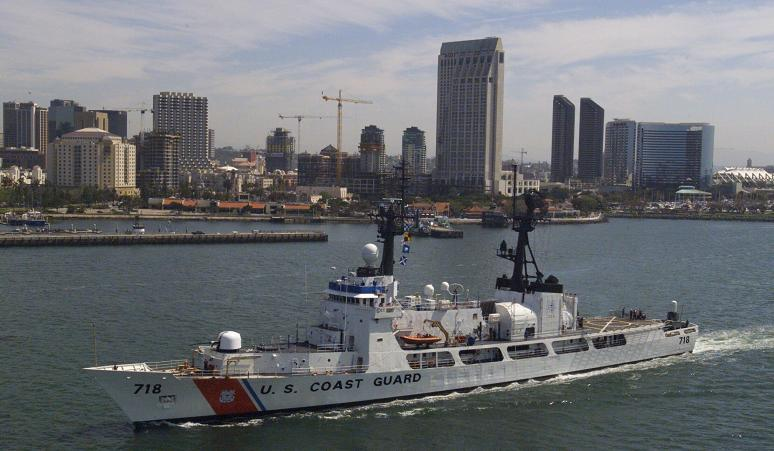
- USCGC Chase (WHEC-718)

History

United States
- Name: Chase
- Builder: Avondale Shipyards
- Laid down: 26 October 1966
- Launched: 20 May 1967
- Commissioned: 11 March 1968
- Decommissioned: 29 March 2011
- Home port: Naval Base San Diego
- Motto: Nullum Opus Nos Superat; There Is No Work Better Than Ours
- Fate: Decommissioned, transferred to Nigeria

Nigeria
- Name: NNS Thunder
- Acquired: 2011
- Identification: MMSI number: 657701000; Callsign: 5NAG
- Status: Active

General characteristics
- Class & type: Hamilton-class cutter
- Displacement: 3,250 tons
- Length: 378 ft (115.2 m)
- Beam: 43 ft (13.1 m)
- Draught: 15 ft (4.6 m)
- Propulsion: Two diesel engines and two gas turbine engines
- Speed: 29 knots (54 km/h)
- Range: 14,000 mi (23,000 km)
- Endurance: 45 days
- Complement: 167 personnel
- Sensors & processing systems: AN/SPS-40 air-search radar
- Armament: Otobreda 76 mm; Phalanx CIWS

NNS Thunder (F90) is a Hamilton-class High Endurance Cutter of the Nigerian Navy. Originally USCGC Chase (WHEC-718) of the United States Coast Guard, she was laid down on October 26, 1966, at Avondale Shipyards in New Orleans, launched on May 20, 1967, and commissioned on March 11, 1968. The ship is the fourth of twelve Hamilton class, 378-foot (115 m) cutters, and the third cutter named in honor of Salmon Portland Chase. She was decommissioned on March 29, 2011, and transferred to the Nigerian Navy as an excess defense article under the Foreign Assistance Act.

== Design ==
Chase is designed as a high endurance cutter. Her crossing range of 9,600 nautical miles (17,800 km) at 20 knots (40 km/h), and 80-foot (24 m) flight deck, capable of handling both Coast Guard and Navy helicopters, making Chase a platform for extended patrol missions. Her missions included enforcement of all U.S. maritime laws and treaties, fisheries conservation, marine pollution response, defense readiness, and search and rescue. Chase was one of the first naval vessels built with a combined diesel and gas turbine propulsion plant. Chase's engineering plant includes two 3,500 horsepower (2,600 kW) diesel engines, and two 18,000 horsepower (13,000 kW) gas turbines, which can achieve a top speed of 28 knots (52 km/h). Two 13-foot (4 m) diameter controllable pitch propellers, combined with a retractable and rotatable bow propulsion unit, giving Chase high maneuverability.

Chase's capabilities are enhanced by advanced air search and surface search radars including the AN/SPS-73 digital surface radar system that incorporates a state of the art computerized collision avoidance system. Chase uses the Shipboard Command and Control System (SCCS) which uses a network of computers including large screen displays and a dedicated satellite network for communications. A closed circuit TV system will enable the commanding officer to monitor flight deck operations, machinery conditions, towing, damage control, and related activities from the bridge.

== Vietnam and the 1970s ==
After being commissioned in 1968, Chase participated in Operation Market Time. From December 1969 to May 1970, under Commander, Task Force 115, Chase participated in more than twelve gunfire support missions in the Vietnam War. For her service, Chase was awarded the Navy Meritorious Unit Commendation and Vietnam Service Medal. Chase visited the ports of Subic Bay, Hong Kong, Bangkok, and Kaohsiung (Taiwan) on this patrol. In June 1970, Chase returned to her homeport in Boston, Massachusetts transiting the Panama Canal.

Between September 1970 and December 1972, Chase assumed Ocean Station duties at various times on the Charlie, Delta and Echo stations. During this period Chase visited ports such as Guantanamo Bay Naval Base, Cuba and Kingston, Jamaica. In 1972 Chase transited the Arctic Circle, and visited England, Denmark, Norway, and Portugal.

In 1973, Chase participated in Operation Seaconex, (COMCRUDESFLOT TWO), an exercise with a screen of seven destroyers and an amphibious assault ship, helicopter (LPH) carrying anti-submarine warfare (ASW) helicopters and Harrier vertical take-off and landing (VTOL) jets protecting a convoy from air, subsurface and surface threats. On this operation, Chase transited the Straits of Gibraltar and visited Portugal and Morocco. Between the years 1970 and 1974 Chase conducted three or four Search and Rescue cases daily while on various Ocean Station duties.

Between the years 1974 and 1978 Chase continued to patrol the waters of the Atlantic, Caribbean and Mediterranean. Chase visited Guantanamo Cuba Naval Base, Haiti, Spain, Morocco, France, England and Italy. In 1976 Chase was in the Mediterranean on a cadet cruise during the then on-going Lebanon Crisis which culminated in the U.S. naval evacuation of nationals from Beirut (Operation Fluid Drive), led by the attack aircraft carrier USS America after the assassination of two U.S. officials there. In 1977 Chase was among the cutters assigned to protect a part of the U.S. exclusive economic zone (EEZ) created as a result of passage of the Magnuson-Stevens Fisheries Conservation and Management Act, protecting the area from Cape May, New Jersey to Cape Hatteras, North Carolina from foreign encroachment. In 1980, Chase was back in the U.S., on scene at the America's Cup in Newport, Rhode Island. In 1982, Chase participated in “Safe Pass 1982,” a member of the Fleet Composite Operational Group.

== 1980s ==
1981 Chase participated in the Mariel Boatlift, rescuing Cuban civilians in district 7; all crew received humanitarian medals. From October 1983 to July 1984, Chase served in Operation Urgent Fury, the U.S. invasion of Grenada. For her service Chase received the Armed Forces Expeditionary Medal. Until March 1988 Chase continued to display her versatility in performing all Coast Guard missions. Chase repatriated more than 338 migrants during its Haitian Migration Interdiction Operations (HMIO) between the January 1985 and March 1988 and also conducted many drug interdiction operations.

An engine room fire on May 8, 1985, disabled the cutter as it was traveling 70 miles (110 km) southeast of Cape Cod. One crewman was killed. A Coast Guard helicopter removed the crewman's body to a Cape Cod funeral home, and the cutter Chilula was sent to tow the disabled cutter to Boston.

In 1989, Chase was temporarily decommissioned and entered Bath Ironworks Shipyard in Portland, Maine, to undergo the Fleet Renovation and Modernization (FRAM) program. At Bath, Chase was virtually torn apart and reassembled with substantial improvements to many of her systems. Approximately seventy five percent of the shipboard electronics were changed or modified; a third of the existing engineering systems were overhauled or replaced; and major internal space reconfigurations improved the crew's living conditions.

== 1990s ==
On March 22, 1991, Chase returned after completing FRAM, and was recommissioned. After 23 years of service in Boston, Massachusetts, the Mayor of Boston proclaimed October 14, 1991, as "Chase Appreciation Day." Chase was to depart for her new homeport of San Pedro, California.

Chase arrived at her new homeport of San Pedro, California on November 15, 1991. Within a year, Chase continued to lead the Coast Guard and represent the U.S. On September 22, 1992, Chase visited Vladivostok, Russia, serving as the host for the historic reopening of the American Consulate.

In 1994, Chase led U.S. Forces into Port-au-Prince Harbor, Haiti and established the first Harbor Defense Command in foreign territorial waters. During this period, Chase participated in Operation Able Manner/Vigil in Haiti. Chase interdicted 130 Cuban asylum seekers. In 1995, Chase boarded the M/V Xin Ji Li Hou off the coast of Baja California, Mexico, and interdicted 150 Chinese migrants.

Between April and June 1997, Chase was leading the way again by being the first Coast Guard cutter to participate in Cooperation Afloat Readiness and Training (CARAT 97) held in Southeast Asia. Chase worked with the Royal Thai Navy and visited Singapore, Songklha and Pattaya, Thailand. Chase received the Coast Guard Meritorious Unit Commendation from Vice Admiral Card for the boarding and custody exchange of the high seas driftnet vessel CAO YU.

In 1998, Chase departed with USS Russell, USS Crommelin, and USS O'Brien for Military Interdiction Operations (MIO) in the Persian Gulf. During this patrol, Chase diverted four vessels in violation of United Nations Sanctions against Iraq, interdicted 1,527,740 gallons of fuel-oil, and conducted eighty-six gunnery exercises.

In 1999, Chase seized seven metric tons of cocaine, then the second largest cocaine bust in Coast Guard history. Also on this patrol, Chase was also the first U.S. military ship to pull into Corinto, Nicaragua, in over thirty years.

In August 1999, Chase arrived at its new homeport in San Diego, California. There, Chase earned an overall EXCELLENT during its Tailored Ship's Training Availability, and was awarded the Distinguished Coast Guard Battle "E" Ribbon.

== Nigerian service ==
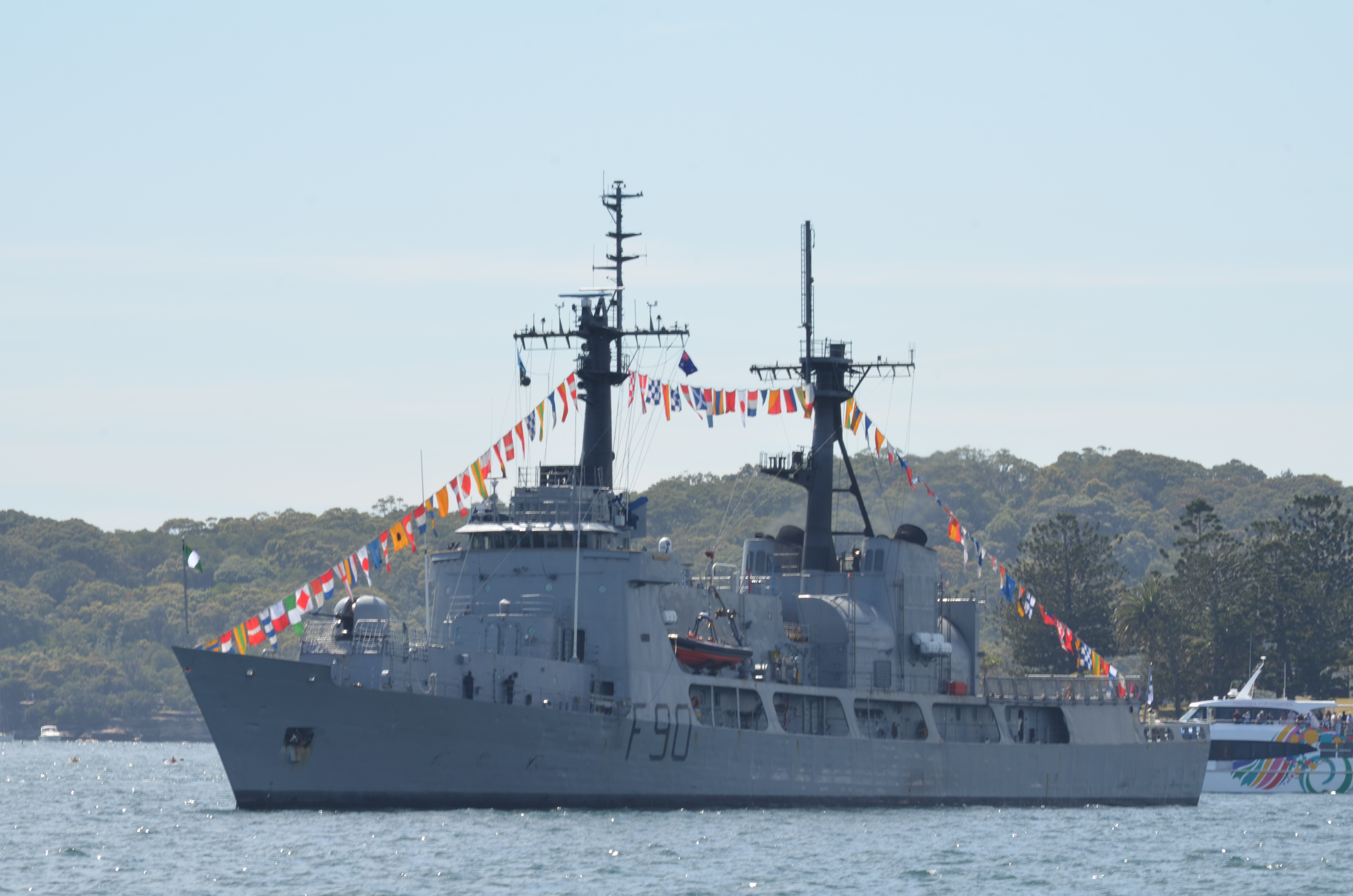
NNS Thunder in Sydney Harbour in October 2013 for the Royal Australian Navy International Fleet Review

In 2011, Chase was decommissioned and donated to the Nigerian Navy, which commissioned her as a patrol frigate, NNS Thunder. Thunder was commissioned into Nigerian service on January 23, 2012.

In March 2012, Thunder collided with a vessel owned by Total S.A. on the Bonny River.

Thunder was the sole vessel from Africa at the 2013 International Fleet Review in Sydney. It was her longest voyage.

NNS Thunder is confirmed to be operational due to its recent patrol of Nigerian waters early 2019 after being grounded since 2016 due to failure of its critical components and machinery.
