= Operation Vigilant Sentinel =

- Part of the Iraq Disarmament Crisis
Date	December 1, 1995 - February 15, 1997
Location	Persian Gulf
Result	Withdrawal of Iraqi forces from Kuwaiti border

Belligerents
United States; Kuwait	Iraq

Commanders and leaders
	(Iraq) Saddam Hussein

Strength
20,000+	375,000~

Casualties and losses
none	none

Operation Vigilant Sentinel was a response to Saddam Hussein advance of its military forces on the border with Kuwait. The United States deployed the 74th Air Control Squadron to Kuwait on August 24, 1995. The specific battle management functions the 74th Air Control Squadron and its counterparts performed included surveillance, data link management and weapons control. The deploying units were part of a ground theater air control system, consisting of a control reporting element and an air support operations center. The US then deployed 3,500 soldiers to Kuwait in October 1996 as a deterrent to further hostile Iraqi acts toward Kuwait following the expansion of the Iraqi no-fly zones.

Third Army/ARCENT provided command and control for a rapid deployment of a heavy brigade task force. Once more, Iraqi threats were decisively met while ARCENT simultaneously conducted a major training exercise in Egypt, codenamed "BRIGHT STAR 95," involving military forces from 6 other nations. This contingency operation validated critical procedures for deployment, particularly the off-loading of equipment from floating prepositioning ships and its distribution to arriving soldiers. The deployment of a "Fly-Away Package" of key contingency staff also validated procedures for a rapidly deployed command and control group able to conduct combat operations immediately upon arrival.

United States Navy and US Marine Corps combat forces (15th MEU) and active and reserve Military Sealift Command forces responded to Iraqi threats against Jordan and Kuwait. Maritime Pre-positioning Ship Squadron Two sortied from Diego Garcia with equipment for a 17,300-Marine combat force and remained on-station to provide rapid response capability.

Operation Vigilant Sentinel's response quickly convinced Saddam Hussein to withdraw his forces from the Kuwaiti border.
