= Gallatin School (Uniontown, Pennsylvania) =

- U.S. National Register of Historic Places
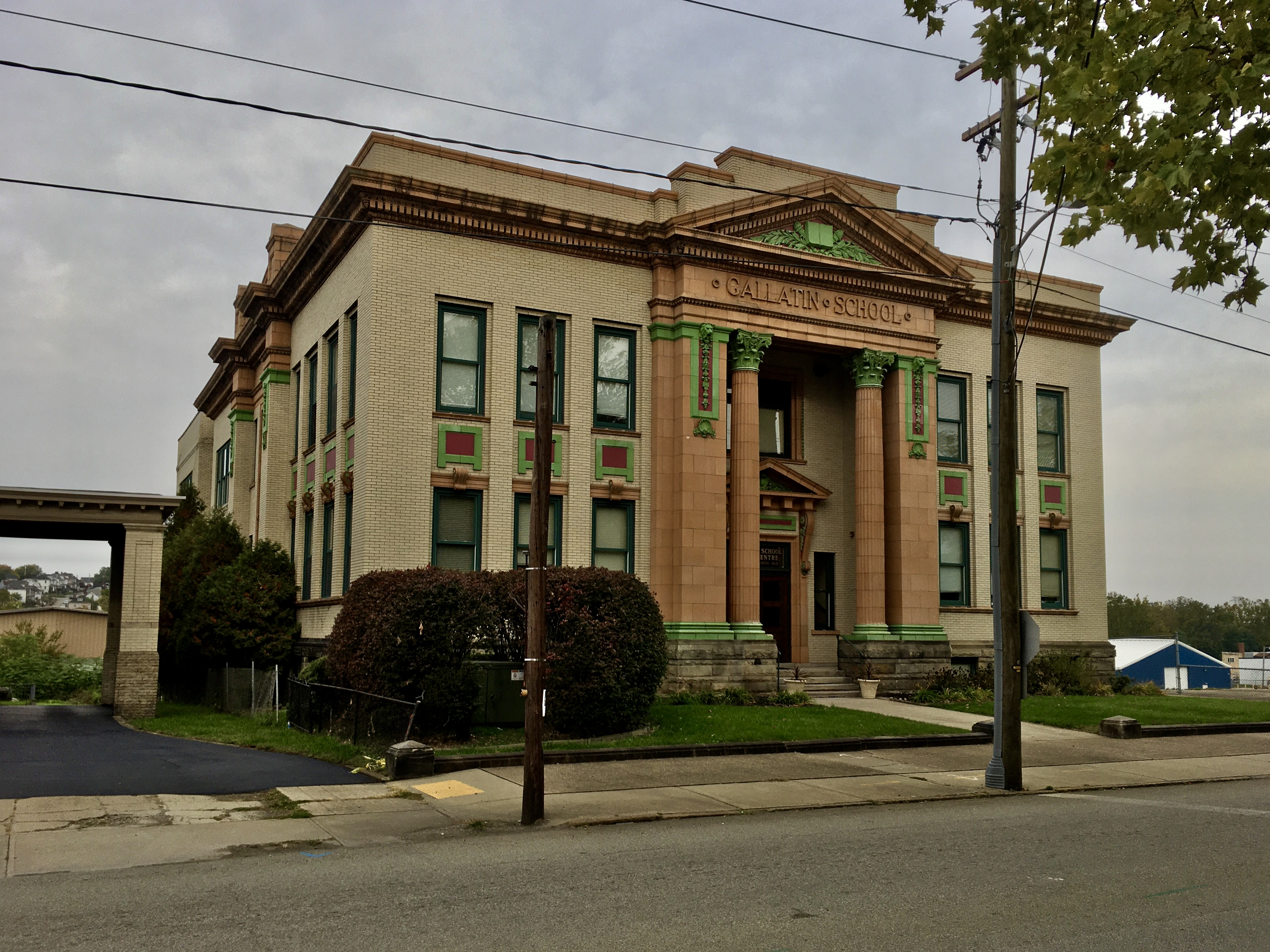
- Gallatin School, October 2020

- Location within Pennsylvania Location within the United States
- Location: 165 Gallatin Ave., Uniontown, Pennsylvania
- Coordinates: 39°53′52″N 79°43′20″W
- Area: less than one acre
- Built: 1908, 1927
- Architect: Cooper, Andrew P.; Altman, Harry W.
- Architectural style: Classical Revival
- NRHP reference No.: 98000902
- Added to NRHP: July 23, 1998

Gallatin School is a historic school building located at Uniontown, Fayette County, Pennsylvania. It was built in 1908, and is a tall two-story, seven-by-eight-bay Classical Revival style building. It is built of buff-colored brick and features a terra cotta portico with Corinthian order columns and pediment. The interior features an octagonal central atrium. A rear addition was built in 1927.

It was added to the National Register of Historic Places in 1998.
