= AN/SPS-40 =

Cold War-era US Navy 2D long early warning radar

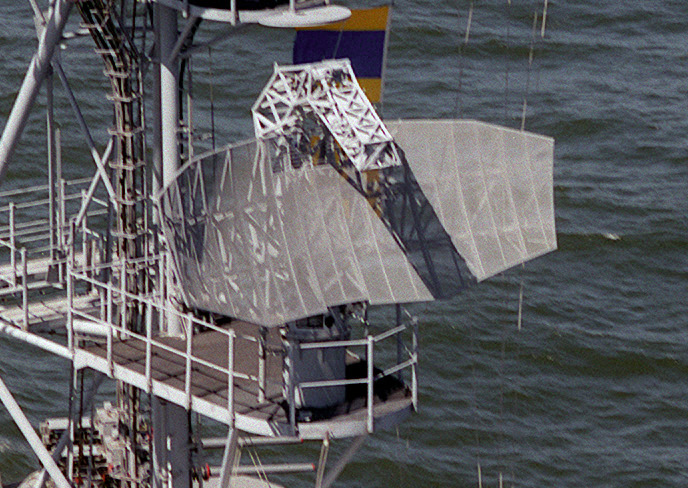
- AN/SPS-40 on USS Trenton
- Country of origin: United States
- Manufacturer: Lockheed Electronics Company
- Introduced: 1961
- Type: 2D Air-search
- Frequency: 400 - 450 MHz, UHF band
- RPM: 7.5 rpm (long-range mode); 15 rpm (low flier detection mode)
- Range: 250 nmi
- Diameter: 140" x 214"
- Azimuth: 0-360°
- Elevation: Vertical beam width 19°
- Precision: Horiz. beam width 10.5°
- Power: 200 kW - 300 kW

The AN/SPS-40 is a United States Navy two-dimensional, long range air search radar that is capable of providing contact bearing and range. It was replaced by the AN/SPS-49 on newer ships and on ships that received the New Threat Upgrade. The SPS-40, being a vacuum tube design, was notoriously sensitive to the vibration from shipboard gunfire. A later redesign into a largely solid-state system not only improved its performance (cutting the number of cabinets by more than half) also featured one of the best MTI (Moving Target Indicator) units in the fleet - a rarity in the early 1970s.

In accordance with the Joint Electronics Type Designation System (JETDS), the "AN/SPS-40" designation represents the 40th design of an Army-Navy electronic device for surface ship search radar system. The JETDS system also now is used to name all Department of Defense electronic systems.

== History ==
The forerunner of the AN/SPS-40, the AN/SPS-31 (XN-1), was developed starting June 1956 by STAVID Engineering. (Note: Later purchased by Lockheed Aircraft Corporation) This radar system was determined to be too large for use in the Fleet Rehabilitation and Modernization (FRAM) program for WWII-era destroyers undergoing modernization. The SPS-40, which used numerous off-the-shelf parts, was proposed as an alternate by BUSHIPS as a suitable radar design for the FRAM program. The CNO directed procurement, in advance of service approval, on 10 March 1959 to meet the schedule for the FRAM program and provide the radar frequency diversity required by OPNAV.

Development and production were conducted simultaneously. A separate Technical Evaluation, normally conducted in the contractor's plant, was not performed due to the compressed development schedule. Instead, BUSHIPS requested CNO approval for a concurrent Technical and Operational Evaluation. The equipment was installed in the USS Richard E. Kraus in August 1961, and the evaluation was conducted by COMOPTEVFOR between September and November, 1961. After some deficiencies were corrected, the SPS-40 was accepted for service use in May 1962.

An improved version, AN/SPS-40A, was introduced 1968. Produced by Sperry Corporation, the SPS-40A introduced a broad-band transmitter and some solid-state receiver changes.

The AN/SPS-40B radar set was developed as part of the DART program to improve reliability compared to earlier versions of the SPS-40. It was installed on the Spruance-class destroyers, as well as the Virginia-class cruisers and the Tarawa-class amphibious assault ship. The SPS-40 and SPS-40A were also upgraded to SPS-40B standard, creating the SPS-40C (from SPS-40) and SPS-40D (from SPS-40A). It also incorporated the new AIMS IFF for air control of friendly aircraft, and a Low Flier Detection Mode (LFDM).

Field change 8 for the SPS-40B/C/D versions introduces a Digital Moving Target Indicator (DMTI), which automatically eliminates unwanted clutter, selecting only objects with some minimal radial velocity as targets. This improves the ability for the SPS-40 to detect targets flying over land and small targets in a strong clutter environment.

The AN/SPS-40E replaces the tube-type power amplifier found on earlier versions with a solid-state transmitter and an improved cooling system.

== Variants ==
- AN/SPS-40 - Baseline version.
- AN/SPS-40A - Upgraded SPS-40, introduced 1968.
- AN/SPS-40B - DART program, major reliability improvements, AIMS IFF, and LFDM.
- AN/SPS-40C - SPS-40 upgraded to SPS-40B standard
- AN/SPS-40D - SPS-40A upgraded to SPS-40B standard
- AN/SPS-40E - SSTX upgrade, replaces vacuum tube amplifier with solid state transmitter and adds new built-in test capabilities.

== On board ships ==
=== United States ===
- USS Atlanta
- Charles F. Adams-class destroyer
- Spruance-class destroyer
- Forrest Sherman-class destroyer
- Belknap-class cruiser
- Leahy-class cruiser
- Knox-class frigate
- Bronstein-class frigate
- Austin-class amphibious transport dock
- Raleigh-class amphibious transport dock
- Hamilton-class cutter
- USNS Capable (T-AGOS-16)

=== Australia ===
- Perth-class destroyer

=== Germany ===
- Lütjens-class destroyer

== Gallery ==
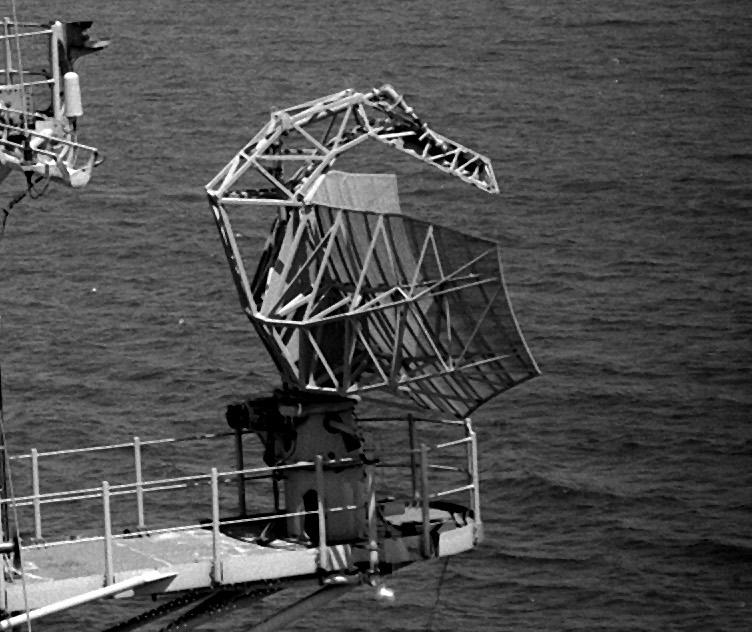
AN/SPS-40 antenna on USS Raleigh

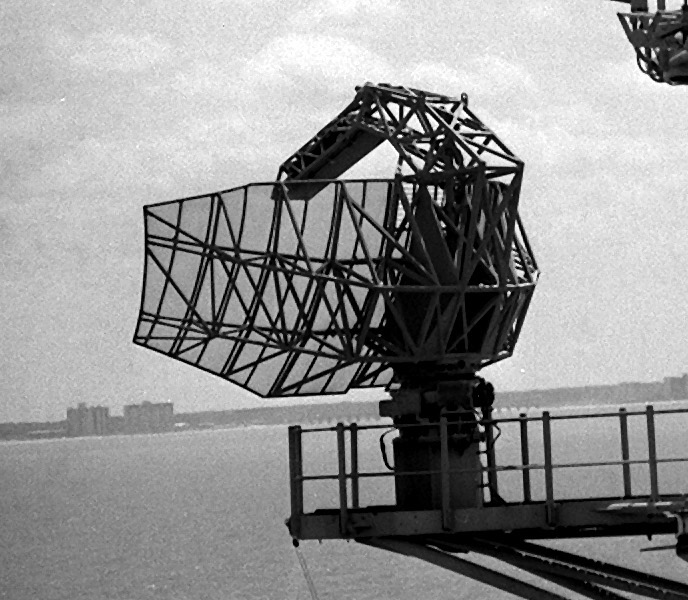
Another view of the same antenna on Raleigh

== See also ==
- List of radars
- Electronics Technician
- List of military electronics of the United States
