= UK–US Exchange of Notes on the British Indian Ocean Territory =

1966 treaty making the British Indian Ocean Territory available for defence purposes

Exchange of Notes between the Government of the United Kingdom of Great Britain and Northern Ireland and the Government of the United States of America concerning the Availability for Defence Purposes of the British Indian Ocean Territory
- Type: Bilateral defence agreement (exchange of notes)
- Signed: 30 December 1966
- Location: London
- Effective: 30 December 1966
- Condition: Entry into force on the date of the British reply to the US note
- Signatories: David K. E. Bruce (US Ambassador); Lord Chalfont (for the Foreign Secretary)
- Parties: United Kingdom; United States
- Citations: 603 UNTS 273 (No. 8737); UK Treaty Series No. 15 (1967), Cmnd 3231; 18 UST 28; TIAS 6196
- Language: English

The UK–US Exchange of Notes on the British Indian Ocean Territory is an agreement between the United Kingdom and the United States, concluded in London on 30 December 1966, under which the British Indian Ocean Territory (BIOT) was made available for the defence purposes of both governments. The territory remained under British sovereignty, sites were to be provided to the United States without charge, and each defence facility required the approval in principle of both governments. The agreement was to last for an initial 50 years and then for a further 20 years unless either government gave notice of termination; it was extended in 2016 and now runs to 30 December 2036. The joint British–American military base on Diego Garcia was first enabled by the agreement and was developed under supplementary agreements of 1972 and 1976.

The published notes were accompanied by confidential arrangements. An Agreed Minute recorded that the British "administrative measures" referred to in the agreement included "resettling any inhabitants", and between 1967 and 1973 the population of the Chagos Archipelago was removed. A secret exchange of notes on financing gave effect to an American contribution to the cost of setting up the territory, paid by waiving British payments for the Polaris missile programme. The notes have been considered by British, American and international courts in litigation over the expulsion of the Chagossians and the sovereignty dispute.

In 2026 the British government said that an update to the exchange of notes was "necessary to ratify" its 2025 treaty with Mauritius on the archipelago, and that it had become "impossible to agree at political level" after a change in the US President's position.

== Background ==
A United States Navy paper of 1970 recorded that a "Strategic Island Concept was developed in 1959 and approved by JCS in 1960", calling in essence for "a stockpiling of islands for contingency use" by the United States. British and American officials held formal talks in London in February 1964 on American defence interests in the Indian Ocean, in which the American delegation emphasised that it wished to avoid the political problems of developing military facilities in populated areas, and to have assured security of tenure for at least 25 years. The British delegation undertook to recommend that Britain acquire the land, resettle the population and pay compensation, and that the United States meet the costs of construction and maintenance.

The United States offered to pay up to half of the cost of detaching the islands, not directly but by deducting an agreed amount from British payments for research and development on the Polaris missile. In November 1965 the Colonial Secretary told the Prime Minister that the Americans wanted their contribution kept secret "for Congressional reasons and in order to restrain the local governments from trying to put up the price". On 8 November 1965 an Order in Council created the British Indian Ocean Territory from the Chagos Archipelago, detached from Mauritius, and the islands of Aldabra, Farquhar and Desroches, detached from Seychelles.

== Negotiation and conclusion ==
According to a chronology later compiled by the British government, ministers chose Aldabra for an air staging post in June 1966 and decided to ask the United States to share its cost, and in August 1966 the US government accepted jointly financed staging facilities there in principle and asked for an early survey of Diego Garcia. The same chronology records that at talks between officials in London on 15 and 16 November 1966 final agreement was reached on the texts dealing with defence arrangements in the territory, finance and a satellite tracking facility in Seychelles. It also records that the Americans agreed that, although the original intention had been to use islands free of inhabitants, cases might arise in which an island could be used without removing all or part of its population, to be decided on their merits.

On 30 December 1966 the US Ambassador, David K. E. Bruce, proposed the agreement in Note No. 25 to the Foreign Secretary, and the British reply accepting it was signed the same day by Lord Chalfont for the Foreign Secretary. The agreement entered into force on the date of the reply. Two further agreements were concluded on the same day: a secret exchange of notes on financing and an exchange of notes on a satellite tracking facility in Seychelles.

The defence notes were presented to Parliament as a Command paper (Cmnd 3231) in April 1967 and published in the UK Treaty Series as No. 15 (1967). The United Kingdom registered the agreement with the United Nations on 22 August 1967, and it was published in the United Nations Treaty Series as No. 8737. In the United States it was published as TIAS 6196 and in volume 18 of United States Treaties and Other International Agreements.

== Terms ==
The US note opened by referring to the availability, "for the defense purposes of both Governments as they may arise", of Diego Garcia and the rest of the Chagos Archipelago and of Aldabra, Farquhar and Desroches, "constituting the British Indian Ocean Territory". Its first two paragraphs read:

(1) The Territory shall remain under United Kingdom sovereignty.
(2) Subject to the provisions set out below the islands shall be available to meet the needs of both Governments for defense.

Before the first US use of a particular island, the two governments were to consult on the time the British authorities needed to take "those administrative measures that may be necessary to enable any such defense requirement to be met". Before either government built or installed any facility, both were first to "approve in principle the requirement for that facility", with the administrative authorities agreeing the specific areas and technical requirements. These procedures did not apply in emergencies requiring temporary use of an island not then used for defence, "provided that measures to ensure the welfare of the inhabitants are taken to the satisfaction of the Commissioner of the territory". In 2003 the High Court observed that "There are no other provisions which deal with the islands' inhabitants."

The United Kingdom reserved the right to allow third countries to use British-financed facilities, after consulting the United States where appropriate, while third-country use of American or jointly financed facilities required the agreement of both governments. Paragraph 4 provided: "The required sites shall be made available to the United States authorities without charge." Each government was normally to bear the costs of the facilities built for its own requirements, which were to be available to the other's forces within their capacities. Commercial aircraft were not to use military airfields except, exceptionally, with British permission. The United States could freely select its contractors and sources of supply, but was to "make use of workers from Mauritius and Seychelles to the maximum extent practicable", and the two governments were to consult before contractors or workers from a third country were introduced.

Annex I exempted American goods, contractors and personnel from customs duties and certain taxes in the territory. Annex II divided criminal jurisdiction over members of the US forces between the American military authorities and the authorities of the territory, gave the United States the primary right to exercise jurisdiction over offences arising from official duty, barred the carrying out of death sentences in the territory by the US military, and dealt with claims. The House of Lords International Agreements Committee noted in 2025 that the exchange of notes "contains provisions under which the US exercises jurisdiction over US personnel".

Paragraph 11 dealt with duration:

The United States Government and the United Kingdom Government contemplate that the islands shall remain available to meet the possible defense needs of the two Governments for an indefinitely long period. Accordingly, after an initial period of 50 years this Agreement shall continue in force for a further period of twenty years unless, not more than two years before the end of the initial period, either Government shall have given notice of termination to the other, in which case this Agreement shall terminate two years from the date of such notice.

== Confidential arrangements ==
=== Agreed Minute ===
A confidential Agreed Minute recorded understandings reached in the discussions leading to the exchange of notes. With reference to paragraph (2)(a), it stated that the administrative measures were "those necessary for modifying or terminating any economic activity then being pursued in the islands, resettling any inhabitants, and otherwise facilitating the availability of the islands for defence purposes". The minute also expected the American notice of its requirements to be sufficient for the British to give any lessee of the land the notice required by the lease, which might be six months. The minute remained confidential until it was disclosed in the first Bancoult case in 2000. In 2006 the Divisional Court said that by agreeing to it the British government "was effectively sealing the fate of those living on an island" once the United States required that island, and noted that in fact only Diego Garcia had been "required".

=== Financing and the Polaris offset ===
Under the secret financing notes, the United States agreed to contribute to the costs of establishing the territory by waiving British payments for joint missile development; the arbitral tribunal in Mauritius v United Kingdom put the contribution at £5 million. According to Mauritius, a Ministry of Defence minute of 12 May 1967 set out the arrangement, under which the United States waived British payments of up to £5 million connected with the development of Polaris. The minute noted that the White Paper on the exchange of notes, published simultaneously by both governments, "contained no mention of any American payment or contribution". The same minute reported that the Americans would admit the contribution if pressed, because some American scientists had "mentioned a figure of $14 million". A US Navy paper of 1970 stated that "The cost of the agreement to the U.S. was one-half of the detachment costs ($14 M) which was funded by offsetting British Polaris R&D charges."

The British side had agreed with the Comptroller and Auditor General that there was "no need to draw Parliament's attention to the transaction". A draft ministerial minute prepared in May 1967 warned that if the arrangement became known, accusations would be made that the British government "had deliberately deceived the Mauritius Government" in order to secure the detachment of the archipelago at a low level of compensation. According to the anthropologist David Vine, US Navy officials told a closed session of the House Appropriations Committee in 1970 that the agreement included the "resettlement of local inhabitants" and $14 million in Polaris payments.

== Depopulation of the archipelago ==
The High Court found in 2003 that the US government had wanted islands that were not dependent on the goodwill of newly independent states, and that both governments recognised from an early stage that the transfer or resettlement of the inhabitants would be necessary. In 2019 the High Court described the motivation for the creation of the territory as "the provision of a military base without a civilian population". A State Department memorandum of June 1969 described the only inhabitants of Diego Garcia as "non-indigenous copra workers imported from Mauritius and the Seychelles", and stated that in the event of US approval of the project "the British are obligated at our request to remove these workers".

The International Court of Justice found that, following the 1966 agreement, between 1967 and 1973 the inhabitants who had left the archipelago were prevented from returning and the others were forcibly removed. According to Vine, in December 1970 the State and Defense departments told the London embassy that removing the population "was clearly envisioned as United Kingdom's responsibility in 1966 agreements", for which the United States had paid up to $14 million in Polaris charges. Vine also records that a State Department legal adviser wrote in January 1971 that the agreement "provides certain safeguards for the inhabitants". A US report to Congress in 1975 explained the removals by saying that the 1966 agreement envisioned the total evacuation of the islands for military purposes, citing security, the cost of civil administration, and expected social problems.

== Scrutiny in Parliament and Congress ==
The exchange of notes entered into force on the day it was concluded and was published as a Command Paper in April 1967. The financial arrangement was kept out of the parliamentary votes, the Ministry of Defence recording that Britain had "simply reduced" some of its Polaris payments. Vine describes the agreement as having been signed "under the cover of darkness" without congressional or parliamentary oversight.

In the United States, the High Court found that the American proposals were not yet public or approved by Congress when the British bought the plantations in 1967. In July 1968 the State Department told the London embassy that "Authority to use the facilities is provided by BIOT Agreement" and that no further British approval of their use was needed, but that British approval in principle of the construction was needed before congressional committees would consider funding. Congress funded an "austere communications facility" in November 1970. In 1975 it made further funding conditional on a presidential certification that the base was "essential to the national interest of the United States", which President Gerald Ford gave on 12 May 1975, and it held hearings on the former inhabitants.

== Supplementary agreements and amendments ==
The agreement has been supplemented and amended by later instruments:

- 1972 (communications facility). By notes exchanged in London on 24 October 1972, the British government, "Pursuant to paragraph 2 (b)" of the 1966 agreement, approved in principle the construction of "a limited naval communications facility on Diego Garcia". The facility was to include transmitting and receiving services, an anchorage, an airfield and personnel accommodation; the United States bore its whole cost; and the British government undertook not to permit commercial fishing in the lagoon or oil and mineral exploitation for the duration of the agreement. It was known as the Diego Garcia Agreement 1972 and was published as UK Treaty Series No. 126 (1972), Cmnd 5160. According to a State Department memorandum, the United States had originally wanted exclusive use of the entire island, while the British sought to limit the facility narrowly; the compromise defined an area for permanent construction.
- February 1976 (support facility). After the British government told the United States in January 1974 that it had no major problem with upgrading Diego Garcia, and proposed that the agreement be "a confidential exchange of diplomatic instruments but with both sides acknowledging its existence", notes exchanged on 25 February 1976 approved the development of the communications facility into "a support facility of the United States Navy". The new agreement, the Diego Garcia Agreement 1976, replaced that of 1972 and was published as UK Treaty Series No. 19 (1976), Cmnd 6413. It required the two governments to consult periodically, and provided that, apart from the movements of ships and aircraft in normal circumstances, "the use of the facility shall be a matter for the joint decision of the two Governments". It runs for as long as the 1966 agreement remains in force, or until no part of Diego Garcia is any longer required for the facility.
- June 1976 (Seychelles islands). Notes of 22 June 1976 deleted Aldabra, Farquhar and Desroches from the agreement with effect from 28 June 1976, when those islands were returned to Seychelles.
- 1982 (supplemental arrangement). A supplemental arrangement signed in Washington on 13 December 1982 added environmental provisions, including limits on the dumping of waste and on reef blasting, and required consultation if the United States intended to bring in large numbers of third-country workers.
- 1987 (contracts). Notes exchanged in Washington on 16 November 1987, with reference to paragraph (7) of the 1966 agreement, provided that operations and construction contracts for the US installations on Diego Garcia would be awarded to joint ventures of American and British firms, with management control in the American partner.
- 1999 (monitoring station). Notes of 18 June and 21 July 1999, the British Indian Ocean Territory Agreement 1999, approved a hydroacoustic monitoring station on Diego Garcia for the International Monitoring System of the Comprehensive Nuclear-Test-Ban Treaty.

In 2026 a British minister described these as periodic updates "to ensure that the governance arrangements for the base remain fit for purpose in a changing world", listing changes in 1972, 1976, 1987 and 1999.

== Extension to 2036 ==
In February 2015, during the British government's review of resettlement, the US Under Secretary of State Rose Gottemoeller wrote that the United States "considers the roll-over of the Exchange of Notes governing our presence on Diego Garcia a matter of national security", and that it would oppose any action that put it in jeopardy. She added that resettlement did not automatically require renegotiation of the notes, but that maintaining them "may present practical limitations on the scale of resettlement". The National Security Council provisionally agreed in March 2016 to let the agreement roll over for 20 years from 30 December 2016, and the Prime Minister approved the announcement on 31 August 2016.

On 16 November 2016 the government announced, alongside its decision against resettling the Chagossians, that the agreements "will roll over automatically on 31 December if neither side breaks silence", and that they "will continue as they stand until 30 December 2036". The International Court of Justice noted in 2019 that the agreement had been extended for twenty years "in accordance with its terms". Mauritius told the court that it had not been consulted and had first learned of the extension from media reports, which it called "a matter of concern" in view of the arbitral tribunal's ruling that Mauritius had an interest in significant decisions about the archipelago's future uses.

== In litigation ==
=== English courts ===
The 1966 notes were before the Divisional Court in the first Bancoult case in 2000. In the second, the House of Lords summarised them as an agreement by which the United Kingdom agreed in principle to make the territory available to the United States for defence purposes "for an indefinitely long period of at least 50 years". In 2013 the Divisional Court noted that the 1966 notes "made no reference at all to fishing", while the 1976 agreement barred commercial fishing around Diego Garcia unless it would not harm the island's defence use.

In the third Bancoult case, Lord Mance said in 2018 that the original exchange of notes "provided that all of the BIOT be set aside for defence purposes", and that any significant change of status affecting its strategic use would require US consent. Dissenting, Lord Kerr considered that this did not answer the question whether the marine protected area had been advocated to fulfil the Americans' desire to keep the whole territory for their use, "assuming that that desire had persisted since 1966". In 2019 the Divisional Court rejected a challenge to the 2016 decision against resettlement, holding that whether to use "the impending date for the roll-over of Exchange Notes as a tactical negotiating tool" was among the "matters for Government to decide, and not for the courts to go behind". In 2026 the High Court recorded that the agreement "continues until 2036".

=== Other courts ===
In Bancoult v. McNamara, the US government told the Supreme Court that the archipelago had been set aside for the two nations' defence needs by the 1966 exchange of notes, and that the Immigration Ordinance of 1971 had been adopted "as contemplated during the negotiation of the BIOT Agreement". In its 2019 advisory opinion the International Court of Justice described the 1966 agreement and the Agreed Minute, noting that the minute listed "resettling any inhabitants" among the administrative measures to be taken. It found that the discussions between the two governments had led to the 1966 agreement "for the establishment of a military base by the United States on the Chagos Archipelago". The United Kingdom argued before the court that the agreement had been deposited with the UN Secretariat and published in the UN Treaty Series, and that the Mauritian ministers had known of the plan for a base on Diego Garcia. In 2026 the British Indian Ocean Territory's Supreme Court summarised the 1966 notes as confirming that the islands would be made available for American defence purposes for fifty years "with renewals thereafter".

=== International Court of Justice ===
In its advisory opinion of 25 February 2019 the International Court of Justice recorded that the talks between the United Kingdom and the United States had resulted in the conclusion on 30 December 1966 of the agreement and of an Agreed Minute of the same date. It noted that under the agreement the United Kingdom would take any "administrative measures" necessary to meet the two countries' defence needs, and that the Agreed Minute listed "resettling any inhabitants" of the islands among those measures. The court found that the discussions between the two governments had led to the conclusion of the 1966 agreement "for the establishment of a military base by the United States on the Chagos Archipelago". It found that, following the agreement, between 1967 and 1973 the inhabitants who had left the islands "were prevented from returning", and that the others "were forcibly removed and prevented from returning to the islands". It also noted that the 50-year period covered by the agreement had come to an end on 30 December 2016 but had been "extended for a further period of twenty years, in accordance with its terms".

The court recalled that ten days before the notes were exchanged, the United Nations General Assembly had declared in resolution 2232 (XXI) of 20 December 1966 that "the establishment of military bases and installations in these Territories is incompatible with the purposes and principles of the Charter of the United Nations and of the United Nations General Assembly Resolution 1514". Its operative conclusions concerned the separation of the archipelago and the United Kingdom's continued administration, which it held to be a wrongful act that the United Kingdom was obliged to bring to an end "as rapidly as possible".

==== Judge Robinson ====
In a separate opinion, Judge Patrick Robinson examined the 1966 agreement directly, under the heading of the law of treaties. Having concluded that the right to self-determination is a norm of jus cogens, he asked "whether there was a treaty between the United Kingdom and the United States that conflicted with it", in which case the treaty would be void under article 53 of the Vienna Convention on the Law of Treaties. He quoted paragraph 2 (a) of the notes and the Agreed Minute, and wrote that the administrative measures "are as much a part of the 1966 Agreement as the United Kingdom's agreement to make the islands available for defence purposes". In his view the United Kingdom "was charged with the responsibility of the resettlement of the inhabitants", and "Although the Agreed Minute speaks of resettlement, it necessarily implies removal of the inhabitants prior to their resettlement."

Robinson found no evidence in the proceedings that the peoples of Mauritius, including the Chagossians, had been consulted "as to the establishment of the military base on the islands of the archipelago, and the removal and resettlement of the inhabitants of the islands". He noted that the agreement had been concluded against the background of the detachment of the archipelago thirteen months earlier, which the court had found contrary to the right to self-determination, but that this finding "does not mean that other acts carried out in the decolonization process by the administering Power did not also contravene" that norm. He concluded:

The 1966 Agreement therefore conflicts with the right to self-determination of the peoples of Mauritius including the Chagossians, and is void by virtue of Article 53 of the VCLT, since that right is a norm of jus cogens. The 1966 Agreement is incapable of producing any legal effects.

— Judge Robinson, Separate opinion, para. 88

He considered that the Monetary Gold principle, under which the court does not decide on the legal interests of a third state that is not a party, "would not prevent the Court making a finding of voidness of the 1966 Agreement in the circumstances of these proceedings". The court's operative conclusions made no such finding.

Robinson also rejected the United Kingdom's argument that Mauritius had consented to the detachment through the 1967 general election, because by then the detachment "was a fait accompli" and the United Kingdom "had already entered into an agreement with the United States of America for the archipelago to be used for defence purposes for 50 years". He described the Chagossians' story as having three parts: the detachment in 1965, "the Agreement to allow the United States to install a military base on the islands" and the removal of the inhabitants, which together were "a story of alien subjugation, domination and exploitation".

==== Other judges ====
In a separate opinion, Judge Julia Sebutinde described the Anglo-American negotiations that preceded the agreement: the United States preferred that the islands be detached and placed under direct British administration to ensure "security of tenure", and by March 1965 the two governments "were determined to go ahead with the separation of the islands and the establishment of a military base thereon, regardless of the legal or international consequences". Judge Giorgio Gaja wrote that "Establishing a new colony (the British Indian Ocean Territory) in order to construct a military base on the Archipelago and expelling the indigenous population" could not be regarded as a form of decolonisation consistent with the Charter. Judge Peter Tomka noted that Mauritius had told the court that it "accepts the future operation of the base in accordance with international law", and observed: "The Court, however, remained silent on this point."

== The 2025 treaty and the update of the exchange of notes ==
Under the treaty signed with Mauritius on 22 May 2025, Mauritius authorises the United Kingdom to exercise the rights required for the operation of the base on Diego Garcia, and the United Kingdom may operate the base jointly with the United States. The US Secretary of State, Marco Rubio, said at its signing that the agreement "secures the long-term, stable, and effective operation of the joint US-UK military facility at Diego Garcia". In November 2025 the Foreign Office minister Baroness Chapman told the House of Lords that before ratification the government would need, among other steps, to "update the UK-US exchange of notes".

Opponents of the treaty pressed the point in Parliament. In February 2026 Lord Callanan said that the government should have followed "the logical sequence" of agreeing the treaty and then amendments to the 1966 agreement before proceeding with its bill. In April 2026 CNN reported that "it is understood there hasn't yet been an exchange of notes with Washington". On 13 April 2026 the minister Stephen Doughty told the Commons that the US President's position "appears to have changed in recent weeks", so that it had become "impossible to agree at political level" an update to the exchange of notes, "which is necessary to ratify the treaty". He said that "a finalised text was agreed at official level and is ready for political clearance and signature", but that because of the delay the bill could not complete its passage in that session.

In the Lords the next day, the defence minister Lord Coaker said that "The exchange of notes from 1966, although slightly amended, underpins the treaty", and that all combat operations from the base were "subject to joint decision-making". Lord Kerr of Kinlochard said that in his understanding "The Americans are not against the revision—one American is against the revision." Coaker replied that officials in both countries had agreed the changes, but "not all the American system has agreed with those changes".

The parliamentary session ended on 29 April 2026 and the bill made no further progress. In September 2026 a Foreign Office minister, asked whether the United States had agreed to amend the 1966 agreement, said that "the US Government must be content with the agreement before we proceed in ratifying the treaty". On 13 October 2026 the government told the Lords that an agreement with Mauritius "must protect UK interests and command US support". The bill had not been reintroduced by October 2026, when the government said: "We will return to the Bill in due course."

== See also ==
- Diego Garcia
- Naval Support Facility Diego Garcia
- Detachment of the Chagos Archipelago
- Expulsion of the Chagossians
- Chagos Archipelago sovereignty dispute
- Polaris Sales Agreement

== Sources ==
=== Treaty texts ===
- Exchange of notes constituting an agreement between the Government of the United Kingdom of Great Britain and Northern Ireland and the Government of the United States of America concerning the availability for defence purposes of the British Indian Ocean Territory. London, 30 December 1966 (No. 8737) (PDF). United Nations Treaty Series. Vol. 603. United Nations. 1967. pp. 273–290. Also published as UK Treaty Series No. 15 (1967), Cmnd 3231; 18 UST 28; TIAS 6196.
- Exchange of notes constituting an agreement supplementing the above-mentioned agreement concerning a limited United States naval communications facility on Diego Garcia, British Indian Ocean Territory. London, 24 October 1972 (PDF). United Nations Treaty Series. Vol. 866. United Nations. 1973. pp. 302–307.
- Exchange of notes constituting an agreement supplementing the above-mentioned agreement, concerning a United States naval support facility on Diego Garcia, British Indian Ocean Territory and replacing the supplementary agreement of 24 October 1972. London, 25 February 1976 (PDF). United Nations Treaty Series. Vol. 1018. United Nations. 1976. pp. 372–381.
- Exchange of notes constituting an agreement amending the above-mentioned agreement, as supplemented. London, 22 June 1976 (PDF). United Nations Treaty Series. Vol. 1032. United Nations. 1977. pp. 323–324.
- Exchange of notes constituting an agreement concerning the British Indian Ocean Territory and operations and construction contracts on Diego Garcia. Washington, 16 November 1987 (No. 27519) (PDF). United Nations Treaty Series. Vol. 1576. United Nations. 1990. pp. 179–183.
- Supplemental arrangement to the above-mentioned agreement relating to the Agreement of 25 February 1976 on the Diego Garcia facility. Signed at Washington on 13 December 1982 (PDF). United Nations Treaty Series. Vol. 2001. United Nations. 1998. pp. 397–400.
- Exchange of notes between the Government of the United Kingdom of Great Britain and Northern Ireland and the Government of the United States of America concerning the construction of a monitoring facility on Diego Garcia, British Indian Ocean Territory (British Indian Ocean Territory Agreement 1999). London, 18 June 1999 and 21 July 1999 (No. 36627) (PDF). United Nations Treaty Series. Vol. 2106. United Nations. 2000.

=== Court decisions ===
- R v Secretary of State for the Foreign and Commonwealth Office, ex parte Bancoult, EWHC (Admin) 413 (High Court (Divisional Court) 3 November 2000).
- Chagos Islanders v Attorney General and HM BIOT Commissioner, EWHC (QB) 2222 (High Court 9 October 2003).
- R (Bancoult) v Secretary of State for Foreign and Commonwealth Affairs, EWHC (Admin) 1038 (High Court (Divisional Court) 11 May 2006).
- R (Bancoult) v Secretary of State for Foreign and Commonwealth Affairs (No 2), UKHL 61 (House of Lords 22 October 2008).
- R (Bancoult) v Secretary of State for Foreign and Commonwealth Affairs, EWHC (Admin) 1502 (High Court (Divisional Court) 11 June 2013).
- R (Bancoult No 3) v Secretary of State for Foreign and Commonwealth Affairs, UKSC 3 (Supreme Court 8 February 2018).
- R (Hoareau and Bancoult) v Secretary of State for Foreign and Commonwealth Affairs, EWHC (Admin) 221 (High Court (Divisional Court) 8 February 2019).
- R (Pompe) v Secretary of State for Foreign, Commonwealth and Development Affairs; R (Mandarin) v Secretary of State for Foreign, Commonwealth and Development Affairs, EWHC (Admin) 529 (High Court 10 March 2026).
- R (Mandarin and others) v HM Commissioner for the British Indian Ocean Territory (Supreme Court of the British Indian Ocean Territory 31 March 2026), Text.
- Legal Consequences of the Separation of the Chagos Archipelago from Mauritius in 1965, Advisory Opinion (PDF). I.C.J. Reports 2019. International Court of Justice. 25 February 2019. p. 95.
- In the Matter of the Chagos Marine Protected Area Arbitration (Mauritius v. United Kingdom): Award (PDF). Permanent Court of Arbitration. 18 March 2015.

=== Pleadings ===
- Memorial of the Republic of Mauritius. Vol. I. Permanent Court of Arbitration. 1 August 2012.
- Memorial of the Republic of Mauritius: Annexes 1–80 (PDF). Vol. II. Permanent Court of Arbitration. 1 August 2012. Page numbers are those of the PDF volume. Includes R. Newton, Report on the Anglo-American Survey in the Indian Ocean (1964, Annex 2); FCO, British Indian Ocean Territory 1964–1968: Chronological Summary of Events (Annex 3); and correspondence on the 1972 payment (Annexes 66–69).
- Written Statement of the Republic of Mauritius (PDF). Vol. I. International Court of Justice. 1 March 2018.
- Written Comments of the United Kingdom (PDF). International Court of Justice. 15 May 2018.
- Clement, Paul D.; et al. (December 2006). "Brief for the Respondents in Opposition, Bancoult v. McNamara, No. 06-502". Office of the Solicitor General, United States Department of Justice.

=== Archival documents ===
- "British Indian Ocean Territory" 1964–1968: Chronological Summary of Events relating to the Establishment of the "B.I.O.T." in November, 1965 and subsequent agreement with the United States concerning the Availability of the Islands for Defence Purposes (PDF). TNA FCO 32/484 – via Memorial of Mauritius, Annex 3.
- Defence Facilities in the Indian Ocean: Memorandum by the Deputy Secretary of State for Defence and the Parliamentary Under-Secretary of State for Foreign Affairs, OPD(65)124 (PDF). Cabinet, Defence and Oversea Policy Committee. 26 August 1965 – via ICJ Annex 48.
- Greenwood, Anthony (5 November 1965). Minute from the Secretary of State for the Colonies to the Prime Minister (PDF). TNA FO 371/184529 – via Memorial of Mauritius, Annex 26.
- Memorandum of U.K./U.S. London Discussions: U.S. Defence Interests in the Indian Ocean (PDF). 27 February 1964. TNA FCO 31/3437 – via ICJ Annex 25.
- Nitze, Paul H. (1967). "44. Memorandum From the Secretary of the Navy (Nitze) to Secretary of Defense McNamara, 24 February 1967". Foreign Relations of the United States, 1964–1968, Volume XXI, Near East Region; Arabian Peninsula. Office of the Historian, United States Department of State.
- Rusk, Dean (1968). "49. Telegram From the Department of State to the Embassy in the United Kingdom, 3 July 1968". Foreign Relations of the United States, 1964–1968, Volume XXI, Near East Region; Arabian Peninsula. Office of the Historian, United States Department of State.
- Sisco, Joseph J. (1969). "37. Memorandum From the Assistant Secretary of State for Near Eastern and South Asian Affairs (Sisco) to Secretary of State Rogers, 24 June 1969". Foreign Relations of the United States, 1969–1976, Volume XXIV, Middle East Region and Arabian Peninsula, 1969–1972; Jordan, September 1970. Office of the Historian, United States Department of State.
- Office of the Chief of Naval Operations (1970). "39. Paper Prepared in the Office of the Chief of Naval Operations (Moorer): Diego Garcia—Background and Status, 11 February 1970". Foreign Relations of the United States, 1969–1976, Volume XXIV, Middle East Region and Arabian Peninsula, 1969–1972; Jordan, September 1970. Office of the Historian, United States Department of State.
- Stoddart, Jonathan D. (1972). "71. Memorandum From the Director of the Office of International Security Operations, Bureau of Politico-Military Affairs (Stoddart) to the Assistant Secretary of State for European Affairs (Stoessel), 14 September 1972". Foreign Relations of the United States, 1969–1976, Volume XXIV, Middle East Region and Arabian Peninsula, 1969–1972; Jordan, September 1970. Office of the Historian, United States Department of State.
- Bergold, Harry E. Jr. (1974). "65. Memorandum From the Deputy Assistant Secretary of Defense for European and NATO Affairs (Bergold) to the Deputy Assistant Secretary of Defense for Security Assistance (Peet), 17 January 1974". Foreign Relations of the United States, 1969–1976, Volume E-8, Documents on South Asia, 1973–1976. Office of the Historian, United States Department of State.

=== Parliamentary and government sources ===
- Duncan, Alan (16 November 2016). "Update on the British Indian Ocean Territory (HCWS260)". UK Parliament: Written questions, answers and statements.
- House of Lords International Agreements Committee (25 June 2025). UK-Mauritius Agreement on the Chagos Archipelago including Diego Garcia (PDF) (Report). 9th Report of Session 2024–26, HL Paper 146. House of Lords.
- Loft, Philip; Curtis, John (8 September 2025). 2025 treaty on the British Indian Ocean Territory/Chagos Archipelago (Report). Research Briefing CBP-10273. House of Commons Library.
- "Diego Garcia and British Indian Ocean Territory". Hansard, House of Lords. 26 February 2026.
- "Diego Garcia Military Base and British Indian Ocean Territory Bill". Hansard, House of Commons. 13 April 2026.
- "Diego Garcia Military Base and British Indian Ocean Territory Bill". Hansard, House of Lords. 14 April 2026.
- "UK-Mauritius Chagos Treaty: Future Spending". Hansard, House of Commons. 1 September 2026.
- "Diego Garcia Military Base and British Indian Ocean Territory Bill". Hansard, House of Lords. 13 October 2026.

=== Books and news ===
- Hendry, Ian; Dickson, Susan (2011). British Overseas Territories Law (PDF). Oxford: Hart Publishing – via Written Statement of the Republic of Mauritius (ICJ), vol. V, Annex 157.
- Vine, David (2009). Island of Shame: The Secret History of the U.S. Military Base on Diego Garcia (PDF). Princeton University Press. ISBN 978-0-691-13869-5 – via Written Statement of the Republic of Mauritius (ICJ), vol. V, Annex 151 (extracts).
- Bowcott, Owen (16 November 2016). "Chagos islanders cannot return home, UK Foreign Office confirms". The Guardian.
- Ronald, Issy (11 April 2026). "UK forced to halt Chagos Islands deal after Trump criticism". CNN.
- Arjanee, Ameerah (2 October 2026). "UK-Mauritius Chagos sovereignty deal stalls amid fears of further delays". Al Jazeera English.
