= Bonn–Paris conventions =

1952 treaty giving limited sovereignty to West Germany

General Treaty (Bonn Convention)
Convention on relations between the Three Powers and the Federal Republic of Germany
- Signed: 26 May 1952
- Location: Bonn, Germany
- Effective: 5 May 1955
- Signatories: United States; United Kingdom; France; West Germany
- Citations: 6 UST 4251, TIAS 3425, 331 UNTS 327

Map of the occupation and administrative zones of Germany after the Second World War. The states of the American, British and French occupation zones founded the Federal Republic of Germany in 1949, commonly known as West Germany.

Convention on the Settlement of Matters Arising Out of the War and the Occupation
- Signed: 26 May 1952
- Location: Bonn, Germany
- Effective: 5 May 1955
- Signatories: United States; United Kingdom; France; West Germany
- Citations: 6 UST 4411, TIAS 3425, 332 UNTS 219

Forces Convention (Bonn Convention)
Convention on the Rights and Obligations of Foreign Forces and Their Members in the Federal Republic of Germany
- Signed: 26 May 1952
- Location: Bonn, Germany
- Effective: 5 May 1955
- Signatories: United States; United Kingdom; France; West Germany
- Citations: 6 UST 4278, TIAS 3425, 332 UNTS 3

Paris Protocol
Protocol on the Termination of the Occupation Regime in the Federal Republic of Germany
- Signed: 21 October 1954
- Location: Paris, France
- Effective: 5 May 1955
- Signatories: United States; United Kingdom; France; West Germany
- Citations: 6 UST 4117, TIAS 3425, 331 UNTS 253

The Bonn–Paris conventions were signed in May 1952 and came into force after the 1955 ratification. The conventions put an end to the Allied occupation of West Germany.

The delay between the signing and the ratification was due to the French failure to ratify the related treaty on the European Defense Community. This was eventually overcome by the British Foreign Secretary Anthony Eden proposing that West Germany become a member of NATO and the removal of the references to the European Defense Community in the Bonn–Paris conventions. The revised treaty was signed at a ceremony in Paris on 23 October 1954. The conventions came into force during the last meeting of the Allied High Commission, that took place in the United States Embassy in Bonn, on 5 May 1955.

== Overview ==
The General Treaty (German: Generalvertrag, also Deutschlandvertrag “Germany Treaty”) is a treaty which was signed by the Federal Republic of Germany (FRG or West Germany), and the Western Allies (France, United Kingdom, United States) on 26 May 1952 but which took effect, with some slight changes, only in 1955. It formally ended Germany's status as an occupied territory and recognised its rights as a sovereign state, with certain restrictions that remained in place until German reunification in 1990.

Attaining sovereignty had become necessary in light of the rearmament efforts of the FRG. For this reason, it was agreed that the Treaty would only come to force when West Germany also joined the European Defense Community (EDC). However, because the EDC Treaty was not approved by France's Parliament (on 30 August 1954), the General Treaty could not come into effect. After this failure, the EDC Treaty had to be reworked; the nations at the London Nine-Power Conference decided to allow West Germany to join NATO and to create the Western European Union (not to be confused with a predecessor thereof, the Western Union, nor with a successor, the European Union).

With this development, West Germany, under the leadership of Konrad Adenauer, and against the backdrop of the developing Cold War, became a fully-trusted partner of the western allies. Then, with the second draft of the General Treaty, West Germany largely regained its sovereignty. The Allies, however, retained some control over western Germany until 1991 (see further: Two Plus Four Agreement). Also, the end of the occupation regime in West Germany technically did not extend to Berlin (indeed the continuation of the presence of the Western Allies in West Berlin was necessary and even desired by West Germany given the Cold War context), and the occupation of Berlin by the Allies was only finalized in 1994 under the terms of the Two Plus Four Treaty.

== Settlement Convention ==
Article 1 of Schedule I of the Settlement Convention provides that the Federal Republic of Germany is accorded "the full authority of a sovereign State over its internal and external affairs". However, Article 2 provides that the Three Powers retain their rights "relating to Berlin and to Germany as a whole, including the reunification of Germany and a peace settlement". Article 2 was designed to prevent acts undertaken by the Allies during the German occupation from being questioned retroactively by West German courts.

Miriam Aziz of The Robert Schumann Centre, of the European University Institute, makes the point that there is a difference between the wording of the Settlement Convention "the full authority of a sovereign State" and the wording in the Treaty on the Final Settlement with Respect to Germany of 1990 in which Germany is referred to as having "full sovereignty over its internal and external affairs", gives rise to a distinction between de facto and de jure sovereignty. Detlef Junker of the Ruprecht-Karls-Universität Heidelberg agrees with this analysis: "In the October 23, 1954, Paris Agreements, Adenauer pushed through the following laconic wording: 'The Federal Republic shall accordingly [after termination of the occupation regime] have the full authority of a sovereign state over its internal and external affairs.' If this was intended as a statement of fact, it must be conceded that it was partly fiction and, if interpreted as wishful thinking, it was a promise that went unfulfilled until 1990. The Allies maintained their rights and responsibilities regarding Berlin and Germany as a whole, particularly the responsibility for future reunification and a future peace treaty."

== See also ==
- Petersberg Protocol of November 1949. Signed between the three Allies and Konrad Adenauer, the first Chancellor of the Federal Republic of Germany.
- London and Paris Conferences
- Four Power Agreement on Berlin
- Two Plus Four Agreement (Treaty on the Final Settlement with Respect to Germany)
