= U.S.–Soviet Incidents at Sea agreement =

1972 agreement between the United States and Soviet Union

Incidents at Sea Agreement
Agreement on the Prevention of Incidents On and Over the High Seas
- Signed: 25 May 1972
- Effective: 25 May 1972
- Signatories: Soviet Union; United States
- Citations: 23 UST 1168; TIAS 7379; 852 UNTS 151

The US-Soviet Incidents at Sea agreement is a 1972 bilateral agreement between the United States and the Soviet Union to reduce the chance of an incident at sea between the two countries and, in if one occurred, to prevent it from escalating.

The United States proposed having talks on the agreement in 1968, and the Soviet Union accepted. Talks were conducted in Moscow on October 11, 1971 and in Washington, D.C. on May 17, 1972. The final agreement was signed during the Moscow Summit on May 25, 1972, by United States Secretary of the Navy John Warner and Soviet Navy Commander-in-Chief Fleet Admiral of the Soviet Union Sergey Gorshkov.

== Provisions ==
The agreement provides for:

- steps to avoid ship collisions
- not interfering in the "formations" of the other party;
- avoiding maneuvers in areas of heavy sea traffic;
- requiring surveillance ships to maintain a safe distance from the object of investigation so as to avoid "embarrassing or endangering the ships under surveillance";
- using accepted international signals when ships maneuver near one another;
- not simulating attacks at, launching objects toward, or illuminating the bridges of the other party's ships;
- informing vessels when submarines are exercising near them; and
- requiring aircraft commanders to use the greatest caution and prudence in approaching aircraft and ships of the other party and not permitting simulated attacks against aircraft or ships, performing aerobatics over ships, or dropping hazardous objects near them.

In addition, both sides agreed to provide notice three to five days in advance, as a rule, of any projected actions that might "represent a danger to navigation or to aircraft in flight"; to channel information on incidents through naval attachés assigned to the respective capitals; and (3) to hold annual meetings to review the implementation of the Agreement.

== See also ==
- Korean Air Lines Flight 007 § Search for KAL 007 in international waters - an incident of violation of Incident at Sea agreement
- Code for Unplanned Encounters at Sea
