= Treaty of Manila (1946) =

Treaty establishing the Philippines as an independent sovereign state

- July 1946 newsreel
- Signed: July 4, 1946
- Location: Manila, Philippines
- Effective: October 22, 1946
- Condition: Exchange of ratifications
- Signatories: United States of America; Republic of the Philippines
- Depositary: Government of the Philippines
- Citations: 61 Stat. 1174, TIAS 1568, 11 Bevans 3, 7 UNTS 3
- Language: English

Full text
- Treaty of Manila (1946) at Wikisource

The Treaty of Manila of 1946, formally the Treaty of General Relations and Protocol, is a treaty of general relations signed on July 4, 1946, in Manila, the capital of the Philippines. It relinquished U.S. sovereignty over the Philippines and recognized the independence of the Republic of the Philippines. The treaty was signed by High Commissioner Paul V. McNutt as representative of the United States and President Manuel Roxas as representative of the Philippines.

It was signed by US president Harry S. Truman on August 14, 1946, after the U.S. Senate gave its advice and consent on July 31, 1946, by ratification of the treaty. It was ratified by the Philippines on September 30, 1946. The treaty entered into force on October 22, 1946, when ratifications were exchanged. The treaty was accompanied by a "provisional agreement concerning friendly relations and diplomatic and consular representation" (60 Stat. 1800, TIAS 1539, 6 UNTS 335) until the treaty was ratified.

== Background ==
Commodore Dewey's decisive victory in the Battle of Manila Bay on May 1, 1898, marked the fall of Spanish inshore defenses in the Philippines. Dewey's victory was later followed by an alliance between US forces and Filipino forces commanded by General Emilio Aguinaldo, who declared Philippine independence on June 12, 1898, and went on to form the First Philippine Republic. Aguinaldo's proclamation of independence was recognized by neither Spain nor the US.

At the time of Aguinaldo's proclamation, Filipino troops were set on defeating the last of the Spaniards. By the end of July, an estimated total of 12,000 US troops had arrived to join the Filipino forces. Tensions in the alliance surfaced during this period. To begin with, the American and Filipino troops were said to have "lacked that camaraderie usually present between military associates." In Major Cornelius Gardner's words:

Almost without exception, soldiers and also many officers refer to the natives in their presence as "niggers" and natives are beginning to understand what the word "nigger" means.

The "painful discrepancy in interests" became increasingly obvious to Aguinaldo, who once declined to attend a Fourth of July ceremony in Cavite after he was addressed "general", instead of "president", in the written invitation. The intentionality behind the alliance was directly addressed in conversations between Aguinaldo, Dewey, and other US generals. In a meeting, Aguinaldo was reported to have bluntly asked, "Does the United States intend to hold the Philippines as dependencies?" Brigadier General Thomas Anderson dismissed Aguinaldo's speculations: "I cannot answer that, but in 122 years we have established no colonies.... I leave you to draw your own inference."

=== Treaty of Paris (1898) ===
The Philippine–American War culminated in the formal transfer of power over the Philippines. The Philippine Proclamation of Independence on June 12, 1898, was neglected by both Spain and the U.S. Instead, both agreed on a set of terms provided by the Treaty of Paris to which the First Philippine Republic objected, marking the start of the Philippine–American War.

The Treaty of Paris of 1898 was an agreement made in 1898 that involved Spain relinquishing nearly all of the remaining Spanish Empire, especially Cuba, and ceding Puerto Rico, Guam, and the Philippines to the United States. The cession of the Philippines involved a payment of $20 million from the United States to Spain. The treaty was signed on December 10, 1898, and ended the Spanish–American War. The Treaty of Paris came into effect on April 11, 1899, when the documents of ratification were exchanged.

The Treaty of Paris marked the end of the Spanish Empire, apart from some small holdings in Africa. It marked the beginning of the age of the United States as a world power.

=== Initial considerations of independence ===
In 1899, US President William McKinley appointed the First Philippine Commission to investigate and to make recommendations on the islands. Although it concluded "the Filipinos are wholly unprepared for independence... there being no Philippine nation, but only a collection of different peoples," it acknowledged Philippine desires for independence and recommended measures, such as public education and a bicameral legislature, to create an "advancement to a position among the most civilized peoples of the world" and thus to "an enlightened system of government under which the Philippine people may enjoy the largest measure of home rule and the amplest liberty."

The Philippine–American War intervened, during which McKinley heeded the commission's recommendations, established the Second Philippine Commission (the Taft Commission), and granted it legislative and limited executive powers. At first, it was the sole legislative body of the Philippines, but after the passage of the Philippine Organic Act in 1902, the Commission functioned as one house of a bicameral legislature.

By the end of his term, US President Theodore Roosevelt "came to believe that the United States could not sustain long-term imperialism because of its ideals of self-government and its party system."

Furthermore, many Republicans and most Democrats had started to demand for an immediate promise by the US of eventual independence, which contributed to the slow US embrace of eventual Philippine independence.

In 1916, Congress passed the Jones Law, which served as the new organic act, or constitution, for the Philippines. Its preamble stated that the eventual independence of the Philippines would be American policy, subject to the establishment of a stable government. It removed the commission from the upper house of the legislature and replaced it with an elected senate, thus changing the Philippine Legislature into the Philippines' first fully-elected body and making it more autonomous of the US government. However, the executive branch continued to be headed by an appointed Governor-General of the Philippines, who would always be an American.

=== Commonwealth of the Philippines (1934–1942, 1945–1946) ===
In 1934, Manuel L. Quezon, the President of the Senate of the Philippines, headed a "Philippine Independence mission" to Washington, DC. It successfully lobbied Congress and led to the passage of the Tydings–McDuffie Act, officially the Philippine Independence Act, setting into motion the process for the Philippines to become an independent country after a ten-year transition period. Under the act, the 1935 Constitution of the Philippines was written and the Commonwealth of the Philippines was established, with the first directly elected President of the Philippines (direct elections to the Philippine Legislature have been held since 1907). The Commonwealth, as established in 1935 featured a very strong executive, a unicameral national assembly, and a supreme court that had entirely Filipinos for the first time since 1901.

In 1935, Quezon won the election to fill the newly created office of President, and a government was formed on the basis of principles that were superficially similar to the US Constitution. The new government embarked on an ambitious agenda of establishing the basis for national defense, greater control over the economy, reforms in education, improvement of transport, the colonization of the island of Mindanao, and the promotion of local capital and industrialization. The Commonwealth however, was also faced with agrarian unrest, an uncertain diplomatic and military situation in Southeast Asia, and uncertainty about the level of United States commitment to the future Republic of the Philippines.

In 1939 and 1940, the Philippine Constitution was amended to restore a bicameral Congress and to permit the re-election of Quezon, previously restricted to a single, six-year term.

During the Commonwealth years, the Philippines sent one elected Resident Commissioner to the US House of Representatives, as Puerto Rico and other U.S. territories do.

=== Japanese occupation (1942–1945) ===
The Japanese invaded the Philippines in late 1941, gaining full control of the islands by May 1942. The occupation continued for three years until the surrender of Japan. The Commonwealth government went into exile from 1942 to 1945.

=== Independence (1946) ===
The Commonwealth ended when the United States recognized Philippine independence on July 4, 1946, as scheduled per the Tyding-McDuffie Act and Article XVIII of the 1935 Constitution. In accordance with the Tydings–McDuffie Act, President Harry S. Truman issued Proclamation 2695 of July 4, 1946 officially recognizing the independence of the Philippines. On the same day, the Treaty of Manila was signed.

However, the economy remained dependent on the United States. As a precondition for receiving war rehabilitation grants from the United States, the Philippines agreed to the Bell Trade Act, otherwise known as the Philippine Trade Act. This granted preferential tariffs on U.S. trade and pegged the peso to the U.S. dollar.

== Provisions ==
The Treaty of Manila relinquished U.S. possession of the Philippines and recognized the Republic of the Philippines. It contained several provisions that established but also limited full Philippine sovereignty.

The treaty contained several key provisions:

- Recognition of sovereignty: The United States recognized the independence of the Republic of the Philippines and acknowledged the control of the government by the Filipino people.
- Military base retention: The United States retained military bases and related assets and the rights to seek "the mutual protection of the United States of America and of the Republic of the Philippines," as agreed upon by the Philippine government.
- Diplomatic representation: The United States would provide temporary diplomatic representation on behalf of the Philippines when it was requested by its government and agreed upon by the United States.
- Temporary judicial influence: Decisions on all cases pending before the U.S. Supreme Court before independence regarding the Philippine government and people would take effect. No new cases originating in the Philippines could be filed in the U.S. Supreme Court.
- Adherence to all continuing U.S. obligations of the Treaty of Paris (1898): The Philippines had to adhere to any continuing obligations of that treaty, which included:
  - Freedom of religion for all Filipinos
  - Right of Spanish citizens in the Philippines to appear before the courts and receive equal treatment before the law
  - Maintaining the validity of Spanish patents and copyrights

== Limitations ==
On July 4, 1946, representatives of the United States of America and of the Republic of the Philippines signed the Treaty of General Relations between the two governments. The treaty provided for the recognition of the independence of the Republic of the Philippines as of July 4, 1946, and the relinquishment of American sovereignty over the Philippine Islands.

However, before the 1946 treaty was authorized, a secret agreement was signed between Philippine President Osmena and US President Truman. President Osmena "supported U.S. rights to bases in his country by backing them publicly and by signing a secret agreement." That culminated in the Military Bases Agreement, which was signed and submitted for Philippine Senate approval by Osmena's successor, President Manuel Roxas.

For that reason, the U.S. retained dozens of military bases, including a few major ones. In addition, independence was qualified by legislation passed by the US Congress. For example, the Bell Trade Act provided a mechanism by which US import quotas might be established on Philippine articles that "are coming, or are likely to come, into substantial competition with like articles the product of the United States." It also required US citizens and corporations be granted equal access to Philippine minerals, forests, and other natural resources. In hearings before the Senate Committee on Finance, Assistant Secretary of State for Economic Affairs William L. Clayton described the law as "clearly inconsistent with the basic foreign economic policy of this country" and "clearly inconsistent with our promise to grant the Philippines genuine independence."

=== US–Philippines Military Bases Agreement of 1947 ===
Despite these inconsistencies, Roxas did not have objections to most of the US-proposed military bases agreement in 1947. Roxas made the following demands.

1. The United States would acquire the military bases for 99 years (Article 29)
2. Clark Air Base would cover 130,000 acres, Olongapo City would be integrated into the Subic Naval Base, and areas surrounding the bases would be under US authority (Article 3)
3. The United States would have access to public utilities and other facilities under the same conditions as the Philippine armed forces (Article 7)
4. The Philippines would seek US approval before granting base rights to third nations (Article 25)

However, there were two instances that even Roxas "felt politically unable to accept the U.S. position". Firstly, the US proposed to have its own large-scale military facility in Manila even though it would have intervened with urban growth as well as lead to "serious friction between U.S. soldiers and local citizens" because of the hostile postwar environment. Manila-based US military personnel were then already prone to altercations with the locals and so having an extensive US military base will only exacerbate the hostility. Secondly, the US demanded criminal jurisdiction over all members of the US military bases in the Philippines "regardless of who the victim was and whether the offense was committed on or off base, on or off duty," which was essentially a "revival of extraterritoriality."

The US State Department viewed the Philippines' objections as reasonable and urged the War and Navy Departments to reconsider their excessive demands. After a month of negotiation, the US sought only navy and air bases in the Philippines, which removed the need for facility construction in Manila. Roxas praised the US for its decision to reconsider and stated that "on every major matter, the essential interests of the United States and the Philippines were 'identical.'"

On March 17, Roxas submitted the Military Bases Agreement to the Philippine Senate for approval. Senator Tomas Confesor stated that the military bases were "established here by the United States, not so much for the benefit of the Philippines as for their own." He cautioned his fellow senators, "We are within the orbit of expansion of the American empire. Imperialism is not yet dead."

The Military Bases Agreement was approved by the Philippine Senate on March 26, 1947, with all eighteen present senators in favor. Three senators did not attend the session in protest, and three others were barred by allegations of voter fraud.

== See also ==
- History of the Philippines (1946–65)

== Bibliography ==
- Brands, Henry William (1992), Bound to empire: the United States and the Philippines, Oxford University Press, ISBN 978-0-19-507104-7
- Dolan, Ronald E, ed. (1991), "Economic Relations with the United States", Philippines: A Country Study, Washington: GPO for the Library of Congress.
- Golay, Frank H. (1997). Face of empire: United States-Philippine relations, 1898–1946. Ateneo de Manila University Press. ISBN 978-971-550-254-2.
- Weir, Fraser (1998), "American Colony and Philippine Commonwealth 1901–1941", A Centennial History of Philippine Independence, 1898–1998
