= LNTS =

LNTS may refer to:

- Shandong Taishan F.C.
- League of Nations Treaty series
