= United States–Mexico Convention relating to the Final Adjustment of Certain Unsettled Claims =

1941 bilateral agreement

The United States–Mexico Convention relating to the Final Adjustment of Certain Unsettled Claims (in Spanish, Convencion entre los Estados Unidos de America y Mexico Relativa al Arreglo de Ciertas Reclamaciones Pendientes de Resolucion) was a bilateral agreement concluded between the US and Mexican governments in Washington, D.C., on November 19, 1941. It annulled most of claims by US and Mexican nationals against the other party's government, except for claims by US oil companies for property nationalized by the Mexican government, which remained to be determined by future agreements. The convention came into effect on April 2, 1942. It was registered in United Nations Treaty Series on March 26, 1952.

== Background ==
Ever since the Mexican revolution of 1910, the US and Mexican governments were at odds over the issue of oil concessions in Mexico. On the eve of the US entry into the Second World War, Washington's position was becoming more difficult, as the Mexican government led a policy of nationalizing the oil industry, and assets of foreign oil companies were confiscated by it. The US government wished to avoid further confrontation with Mexico at a time President Franklin D. Roosevelt was preparing to enter the war against Hitler, and in an attempt to appease the Mexican government while assisting US oil industry, decided to remit all debts by the Mexican government to the US, which were mostly related to agricultural products.
