= BRP Andrés Bonifacio (PS-42) =

Philippine Navy patrol ship

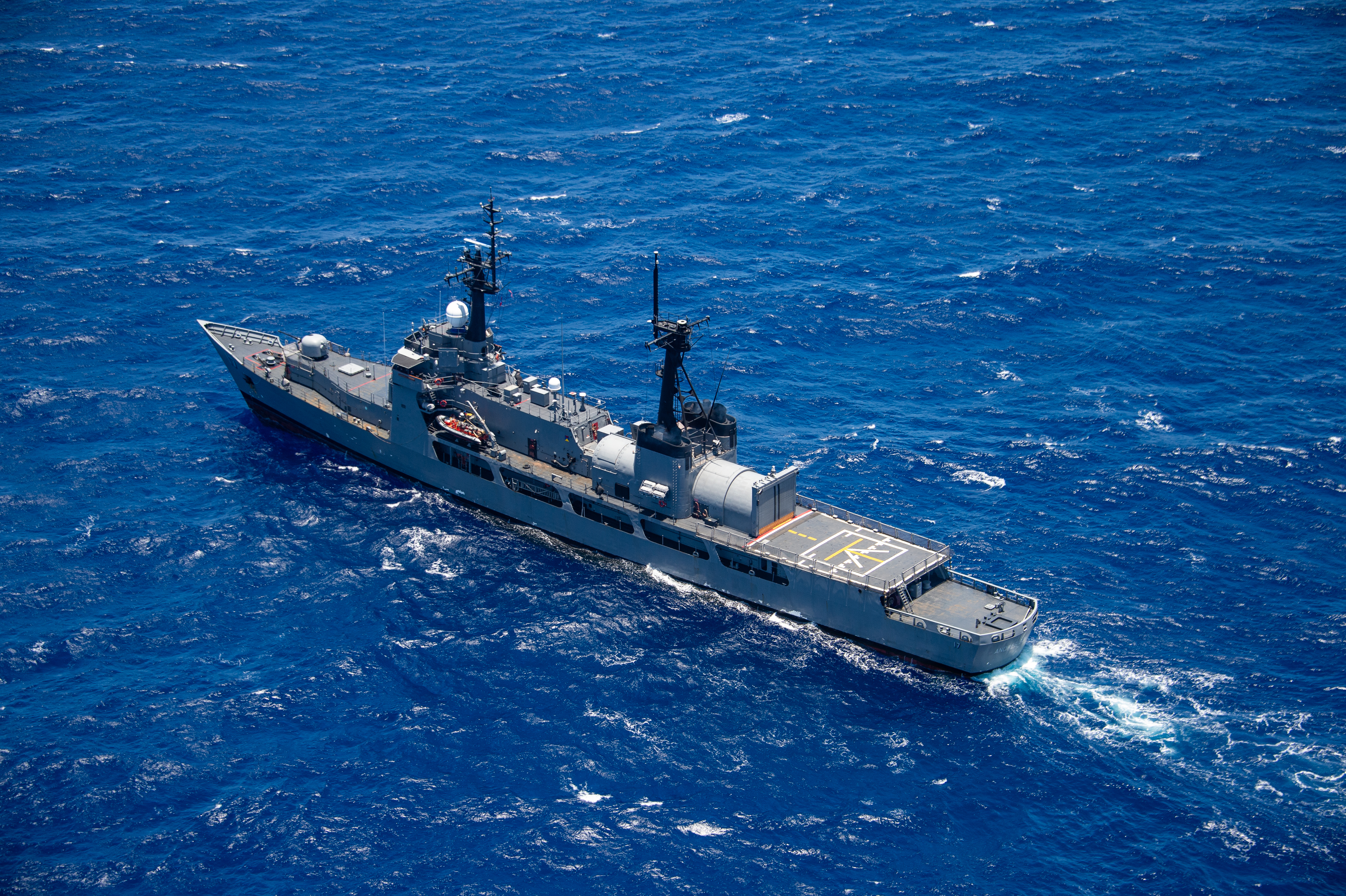
- BRP Andrés Bonifacio during Exercise RIMPAC 2018 sea phase.

History

United States
- Name: USCGC Boutwell
- Builder: Avondale Shipyards
- Launched: 17 June 1967
- Commissioned: 24 June 1968
- Decommissioned: 16 March 2016
- Identification: WHEC-719
- Fate: Transferred to Philippine Navy

Philippines
- Name: BRP Andrés Bonifacio
- Namesake: Andrés Bonifacio y de Castro
- Acquired: 21 July 2016
- Commissioned: 21 July 2016
- Maiden voyage: 1 November 2016
- Identification: Pennant number: PS-42 (2026 - present), PS-17 (2019-2026), FF-17 (2016-2019); MMSI number: 548134500; Callsign: 4DIIL
- Motto: Semper Paratus (Always Ready)
- Status: In active service
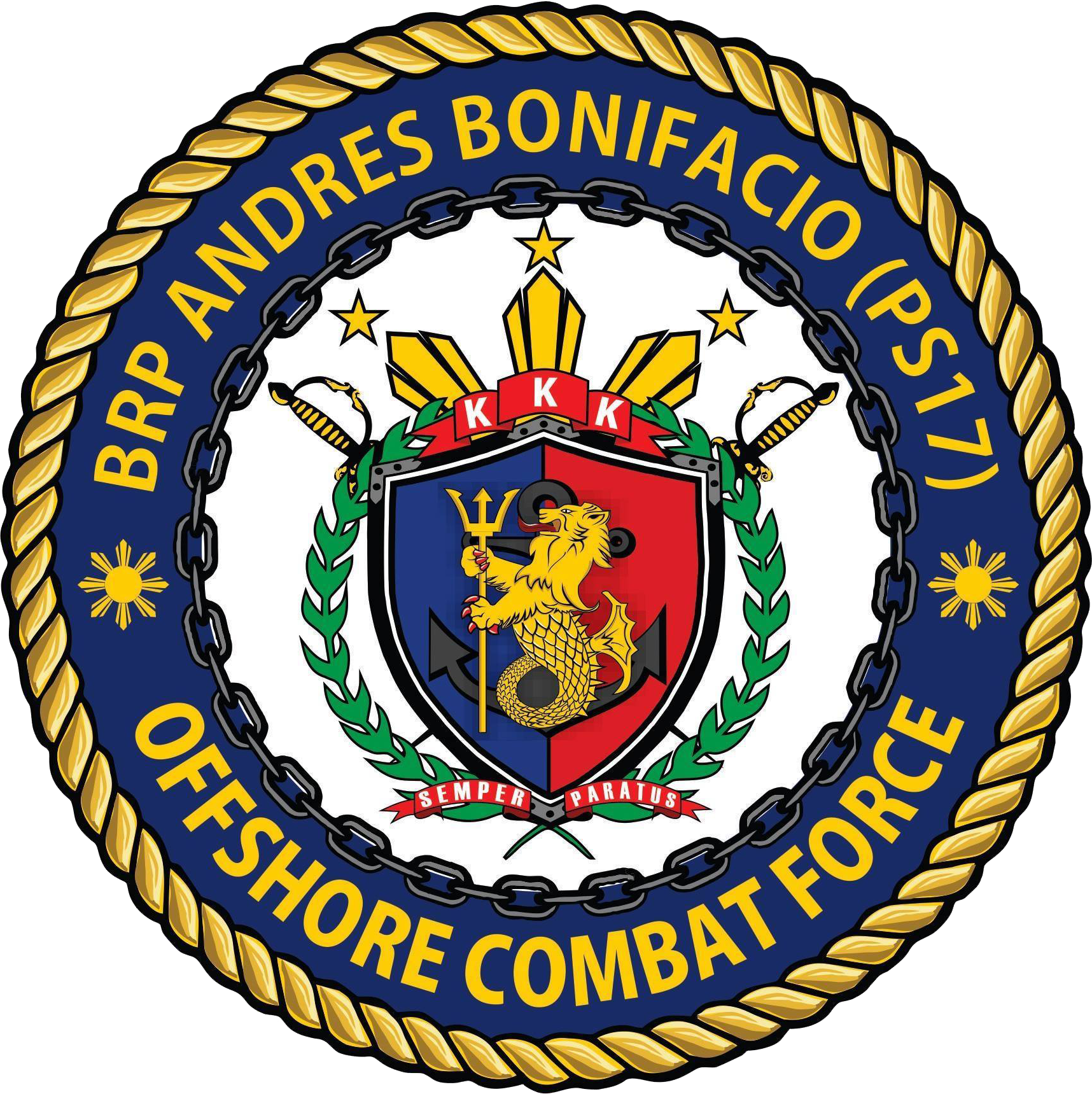
- Badge

General characteristics
- Class & type: Gregorio del Pilar-class offshore patrol vessel
- Displacement: 3,250 tons
- Length: 378 ft (115.2 m)
- Beam: 43 ft (13.1 m)
- Draft: 15 ft (4.6 m)
- Propulsion: Combined diesel or gas (CODOG) arrangement: 2 × Fairbanks-Morse 38TD8-1/8-12 12-cylinder diesel engines, each producing 3,500 shp (2,610 kW); 2 × Pratt & Whittney FT4A-6 gas turbines, each producing 18,000 shp (13,400 kW)
- Speed: 29 knots (54 km/h; 33 mph) via twin gas-turbines
- Range: 12,500 nmi (23,200 km; 14,400 mi) @ 12 knots (22 km/h; 14 mph) via diesel
- Endurance: 45 days
- Boats & landing craft carried: 2 × RHIB
- Complement: 80
- Sensors & processing systems: Combat System: Naval Shield Baseline 2 iCMS by Hanwha Systems; Search radar: Saab AB AN/SPS-77 Sea Giraffe AMB 3D air/surface search radar; Navigation radar: Furuno FAR3220BB 25KW X-band navigational radar Furuno FAR3220BB 200W S-band solid state navigation/surface search radar; Fire control radar: Sperry Mk 92 Mod 1 Fire Control System; Electro-Optical Tracking System: FLIR Systems SEAFLIR 230 electro-optical/infra-red (EO/IR) system (Awaiting Installation); Sonar: ELAC Hunter 2.0 hull-mounted sonar
- Electronic warfare & decoys: 2 × USN-Mark 36 SRBOC (Super Rapid Blooming Offboard Countermeasures) mortar-type launching system by BAE Systems; RESM:
- Armament: 1 × Mk 75 Oto Melara 76mm Compact gun; 2 × Mk 38 25mm Autocannons; 6 x M2HB Browning .50 cal guns
- Armor: CBRNE defense system
- Aircraft carried: 1 × AW109E Power naval helicopter
- Aviation facilities: flight deck; hangar: partly-retractable and partly-fixed
- Notes: steel hull, aluminium superstructure

BRP Andrés Bonifacio (PS-42) is the third ship of the Gregorio del Pilar-class offshore patrol vessels of the Philippine Navy. She is the second ship of the Philippine Navy to be named after Andrés Bonifacio, a Filipino revolutionary leader, regarded as the "Father of the Philippine Revolution" and one of the most influential national heroes of the Philippines.

She was originally designated upon commissioning as "FF-17". In February 2019, the Navy downgraded the status of the entire class from frigate to patrol ship and redesignated her to "PS-17". The ship, together with its two other sisterships, were again re-designated in March 2026, with BRP Andres Bonifacio given the hull number PS-42.

== Design ==
The ship was designed with a high level of habitability and provides fairly comfortable accommodations, including air conditioning.

=== Propulsion ===
The Andres Bonifacio employs the shipboard application of aircraft gas turbine jet engines with the use of controllable pitch propellers. She is equipped with two 18,000 horsepower (13,000 kW) Pratt & Whitney gas turbines and can propel the ship at speeds up to 29 knots (54 km/h; 33 mph). Ramon Alcaraz also has two 3,500 horsepower (2,600 kW) Fairbanks-Morse diesel engines, capable of driving the ship economically at 12 knots (22 km/h; 14 mph) for up to 12,500 nmi (23,200 km; 14,400 mi) without refueling. A retractable/rotatable bow propulsion unit provides manoeuvrability in tight situations.

=== Armament ===
Prior to turn-over to the Philippine Navy, the ship was armed with a Mk.75 Oto Melara 76mm/62cal Compact main gun, two Mk.38 25 mm Bushmaster chain guns at midships, and a Phalanx CIWS system aft. The CIWS and chain guns were removed prior to its turn-over, with the Mk.75 gun remaining.

=== Flight support ===
Andres Bonifacio has a flight deck and hangar capable of handling helicopters.

The Philippine Navy uses the AgustaWestland AW109E Power naval helicopter as its standard helicopter for the entire class.

=== Modernization ===
The Philippine Navy plans to modernize the entire ship of the class, with an initial program to upgrade the ship's sensors, and another program to improve its weapon systems.

Several systems were acquired through US Foreign Military Sales (FMS) and Foreign Military Financing (FMF), which includes the BAE Systems Mk. 38 Mod. 2 machine gun system, the SAAB AN/SPS-77 Sea Giraffe AMB 3D air/surface search radar, and the FLIR Systems SeaFLIR 230 Electro-Optical/Infra-Red Camera.

Meanwhile, the Philippine Navy will launch a program to acquire, install and integrate several other sensors into the ship, as part of the Horizon 2 phase of the Revised AFP Modernization Program. Among those to be acquired are new Combat Management System (CMS), Hull Mounted Sonar (HMS), and a Radar Electronic Support Measures (R-ESM).

Future upgrades are planned to install defensive and offensive missile systems, as well as torpedo weapon system, although funding is still being secured and might only be included in the next phase of the Navy's modernization program.

In 2020 October 14, Navy chief Giovanni Carlo Bacordo revealed the completion of the 3D modeling program for the entire ship class' cabling systems to be used for their electronic upgrades (CMS + 4 sensors), indicating the project is at least running despite the COVID-19 pandemic.

On 6 May 2024 it was announced that BRP Andres Bonifacio resumed naval operations after the completion of extensive upgrades, including the upgrade of its combat management system and installation of air and surface search radar.

== History ==
From 1967 to 2016, the ship was a Hamilton-class high endurance cutter of the United States Coast Guard that was named USCGC Boutwell (WHEC-719). The U.S. decommissioned the cutter in early 2016 and the Philippines acquired it under the Excess Defense Articles and the Foreign Assistance Act.

The frigate was formally received by the Philippine Navy on July 21, 2016, and commissioned to service on the same day at the USCG base at Alameda, California. She arrived in Manila on December 9, 2016 after port visit in Guam on December 5, 2016.

The ship was re-designated with a new hull number, PS-42, as of March 2026.

== Notable operational deployments ==
In April 2019, the BRP Andres Bonifacio had an unplanned encounter at sea with the frigate Wu Chang (FFG-1205) of the Taiwanese Navy near the Mavulis Island in Batanes. The two ships implemented the Naval Code for Unplanned Encounters at Sea (CUES) during the encounter. The Wu Chang was monitoring the activity at Mavulis while the BRP Bonifacio was on its way to South Korea.

=== Exercises ===
- Langkawi International Maritime and Aerospace Exhibition (LIMA) 2017:

The BRP Andres Bonifacio was sent to Malaysia for its first international deployment as a Philippine Navy ship, to be the Philippines' representative in the LIMA 2017 from March 21 to 26, 2017. The ship also had a port call at the Lumut Naval Base in Perak, Malaysia and conducted joint exercises with the Royal Malaysian Navy, before docking at Port Klang, Selangor, Malaysia for a goodwill visit from March 30 to April 3, 2017.

- Exercise Rim of the Pacific (RIMPAC) 2018:

From June to early August 2018, the ship participated in the RIMPAC 2018 together with the BRP Davao del Sur (LD-602) Landing Platform Dock. This is the first time that the Philippine Navy sent ships to the world's largest International Maritime Exercise which is held biennially in Hawaii. Among the events the ship participated at RIMPAC were a one-day "Open Ship" Guided Ship Tour for the public where the Seabees Band had a Live-Band performance for the ship's visitors.

- Balikatan 2019:

The ship participated on a Visit, board, search, and seizure operation during Balikatan 2019.

== Gallery ==
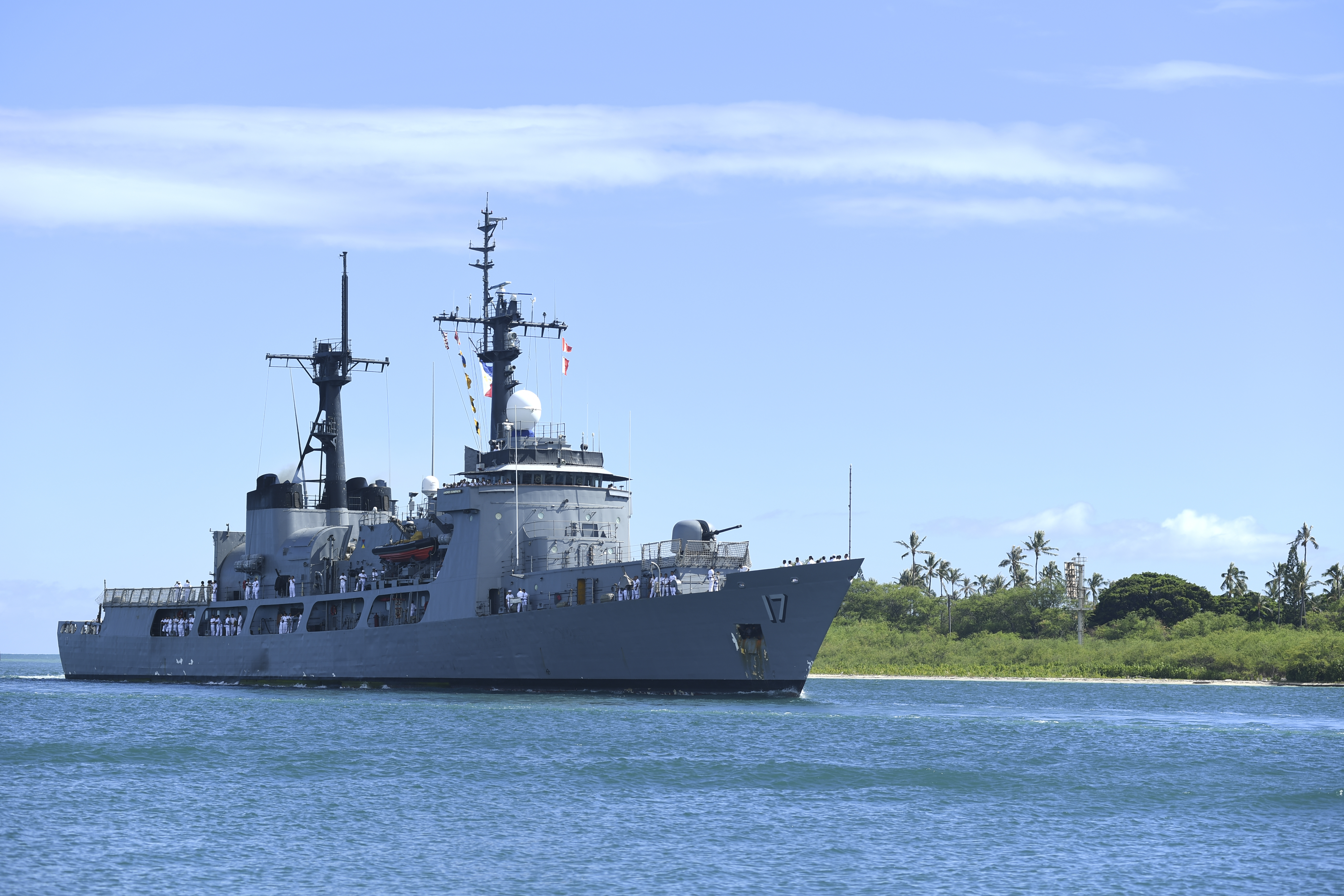
BRP Andrés Bonifacio (PS-17) arrives in Hawaii for RIMPAC 2018.

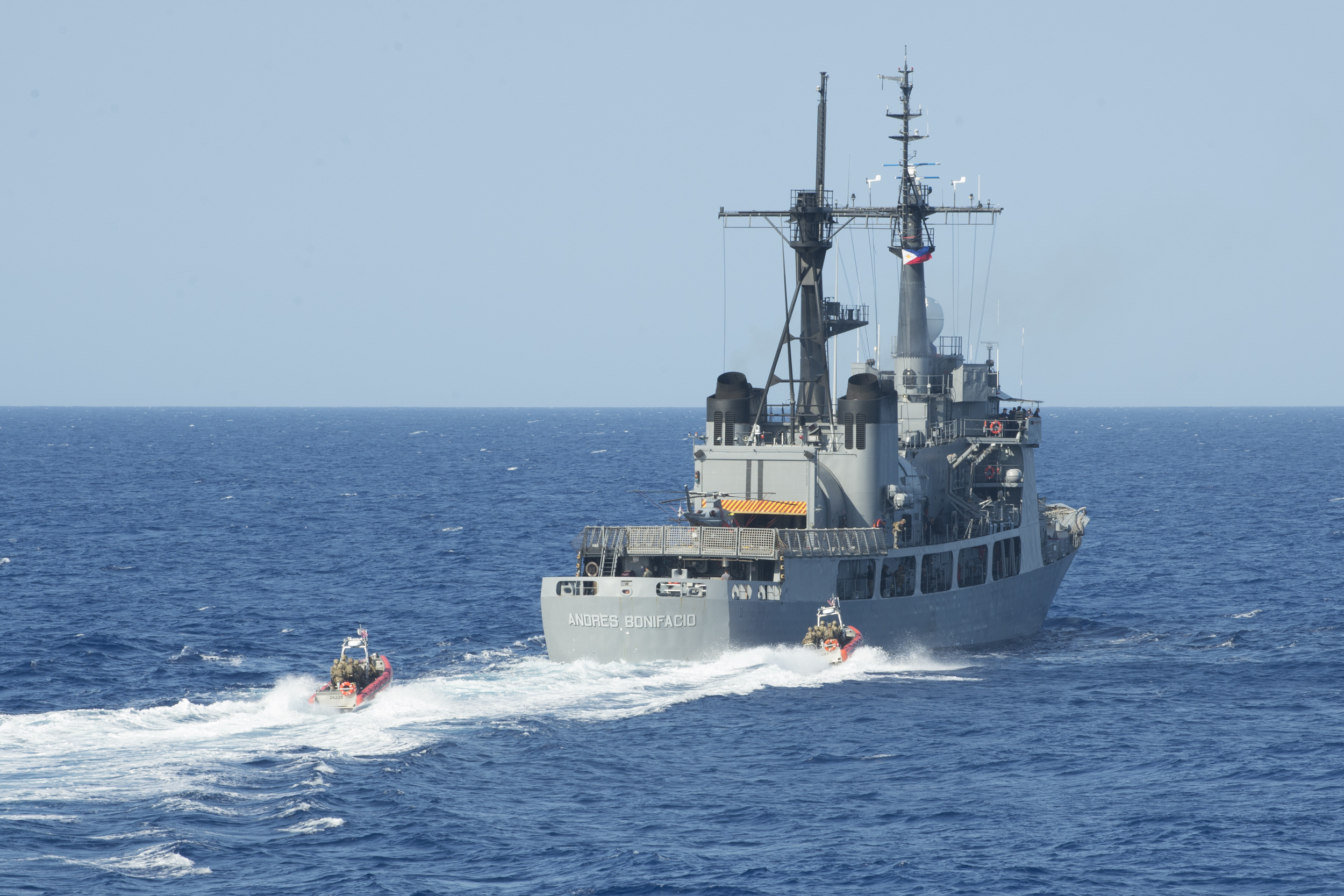
Stern view of BRP Andrés Bonifacio during TDT Operation in the RIMPAC 2018.

== See also ==
- List of ships of the Philippine Navy
