= Treaty of Manila =

Treaty of Manila may refer to:

- Treaty of Manila (1946), treaty by which the United States recognized the independence of the Philippines
- Treaty of Manila (1954), alternative name for the Southeast Asia Collective Defense Treaty
