= United States Treaties and Other International Agreements =

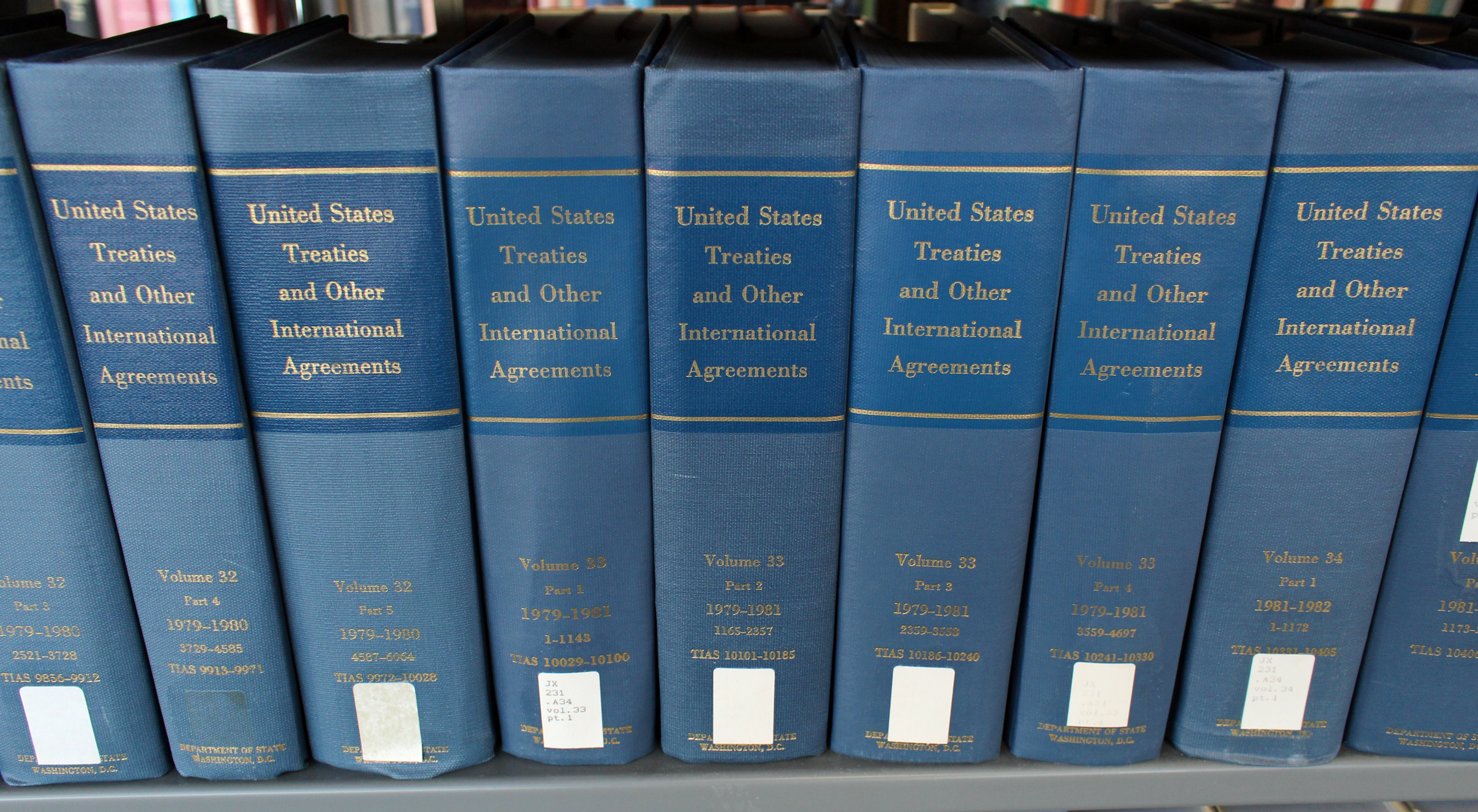
United States Treaties and Other International Agreements

The United States Treaties and Other International Agreements (UST) contains all treaties and international agreements of the United States from 1950 to 1982. It was published annually from slip treaties of the Treaties and Other International Acts Series (TIAS). The Secretary of State was responsible for its compilation, editing, indexing, and publication.

The laws pertaining to reporting are located at 1 U.S.C. § 112a; regulations on reporting are contained at 22 CFR 181.

Treaties and international agreements were formally published in United States Statutes at Large until 1948.

== History ==
Treaties and international agreements from 1776 to 1949 were documented in Charles I. Bevans's book "Treaties and Other International Agreements of the United States of America, 1776-1949" co-authored by the U.S. State Department. UST was created when Congress implemented Reorganization Plan 20 of 1950 in Pub. L. 81–821, 64 Stat. 980, enacted September 23, 1950, adding 1 U.S.C. § 112a. Case-Zablocki Act requirements were modified by Pub. L. 108–458 (text) (PDF), 118 Stat. 3638, enacted December 17, 2004, which also mandated publishing on the Internet.

The volumes are now no longer published.

== See also ==
- List of United States treaties
- Treaties and Other International Acts Series (TIAS)
- Treaty series
