= 2018 Japan–South Korea radar lock-on dispute =

Naval and air incident in the Sea of Japan

- Video footage from the P-1 aircraft, released by the Japanese Ministry of Defense
Date	20 December 2018
Location	in the Sea of Japan; Japan's claim: off the coast of the Noto Peninsula; South Korea's claim: 100 km (62 mi) northeast of the Liancourt Rocks
Result	Strain in Japan–South Korea relations; Both sides agree to drop the issue

Belligerents
South Korea	Japan

Units involved
ROK Navy; ROK Coast Guard	Japan MSDF

Strength
1 destroyer: ROKS Gwanggaeto the Great; 1 Coast Guard cutter	1 maritime patrol aircraft

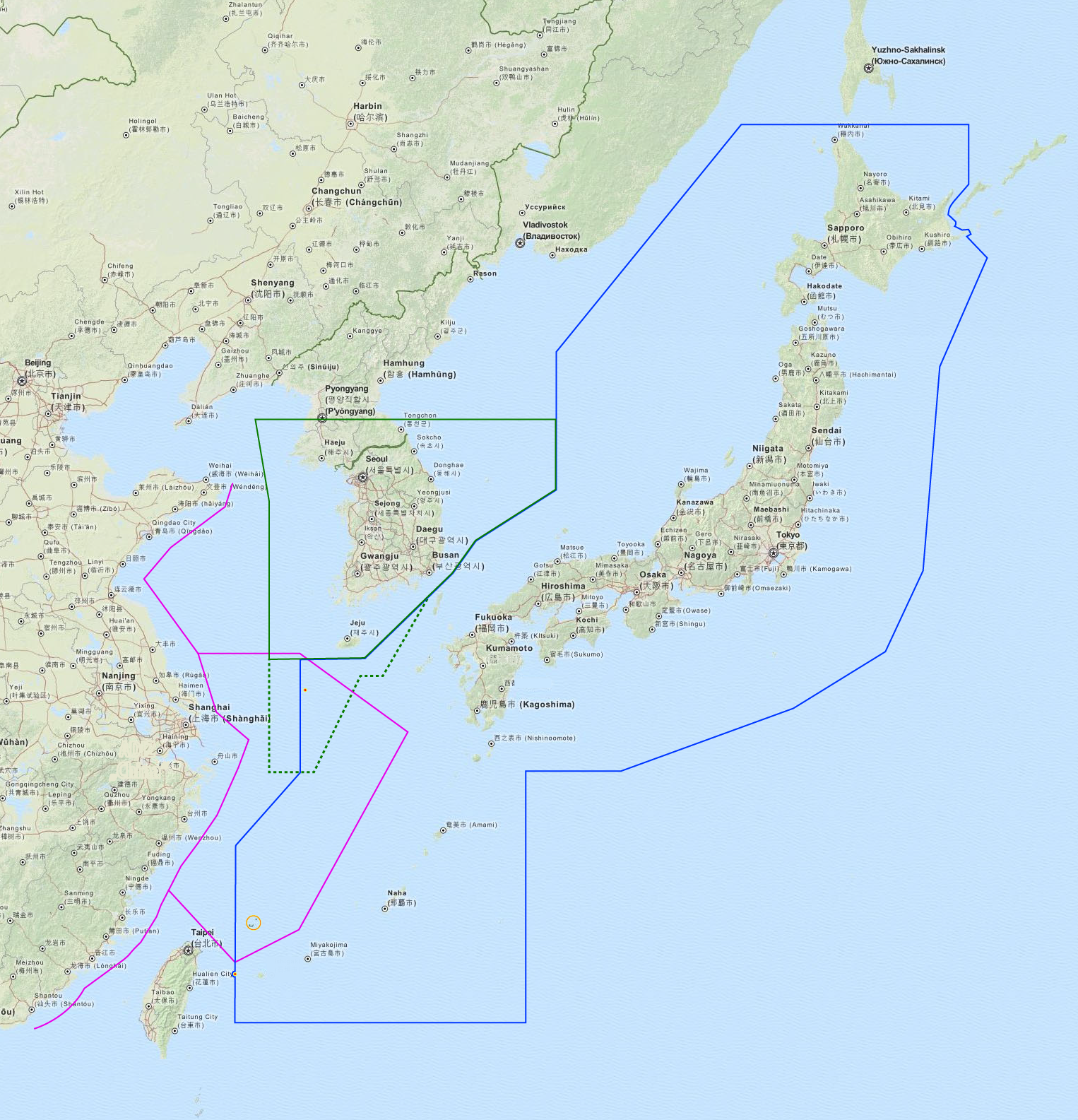
The estimated position

Japan–South Korea radar lock-on dispute South Korean Navy radar lock-on incident

Japanese name
- Kanji: 韓国海軍レーダー照射問題
- Hiragana: かんこくかいぐんレーダーしょうしゃもんだい
Transcriptions
- Romanization: Kankoku kaigun rēdā shōsha mondai

Korean name
- Hangul: 한일해상군사분쟁
- Hanja: 韓日海上軍事紛爭
Transcriptions
- Revised Romanization: Hanil haesang gunsa bunjaeng

The 2018 Japan–South Korea radar lock-on dispute is about an incident between a Japanese airplane and a South Korean warship. The aircraft was part of the Japan Maritime Self-Defense Force (JMSDF), while the vessel was part of the Republic of Korea Navy (ROKN). The event occurred on 20 December 2018, without the firing of any weapon, and was followed by a large diplomatic dispute between Japan and South Korea. In June 2024, both countries agreed on steps to prevent a recurrence, effectively dropping the issue without resolving the exact circumstances around the event itself.

== Incident ==
According to the Japanese government, a South Korean naval destroyer, ROKS Gwanggaeto the Great, directed its STIR-180 fire-control radar at a maritime patrol aircraft, Kawasaki P-1 belonging to the Fleet Air Wing 4 of JMSDF, which was conducting surveillance off the Noto Peninsula in the Sea of Japan on Thursday 20 December 2018 at around 3:00 p.m. (JST). According to Japan's Ministry of Defense (MOD), aiming the fire-control (FC) radar at a plane is a violation of the Code for Unplanned Encounters at Sea (CUES), as a lock with the FC radar is generally considered a hostile act one step before actual firing. The MOD further said the irradiation of the P-1 plane by the radar hit multiple times continuously over a certain period.

In contrast, the South Korean government denied Japan's claims, stating that it was not operating a STIR-180 radar (FC radar) but MW08 radar for the rescue when the Japanese airplane arrived at the site. The MW08 radar is a 3D radar for medium-range air and surface surveillance, target acquisition and tracking, capable of gun control against surface targets. MW08 can be used as an FC radar, but it is not connected with the fire-control system in the destroyer. In addition, South Korea claimed that the Japanese aircraft made a threatening "8-shape" flight continuously at a distance of 500 meters (1,600 ft) and altitude of 150 meters (490 ft) while the warship was participating in the rescue of a distressed North Korean fishing boat.

== Timeline ==
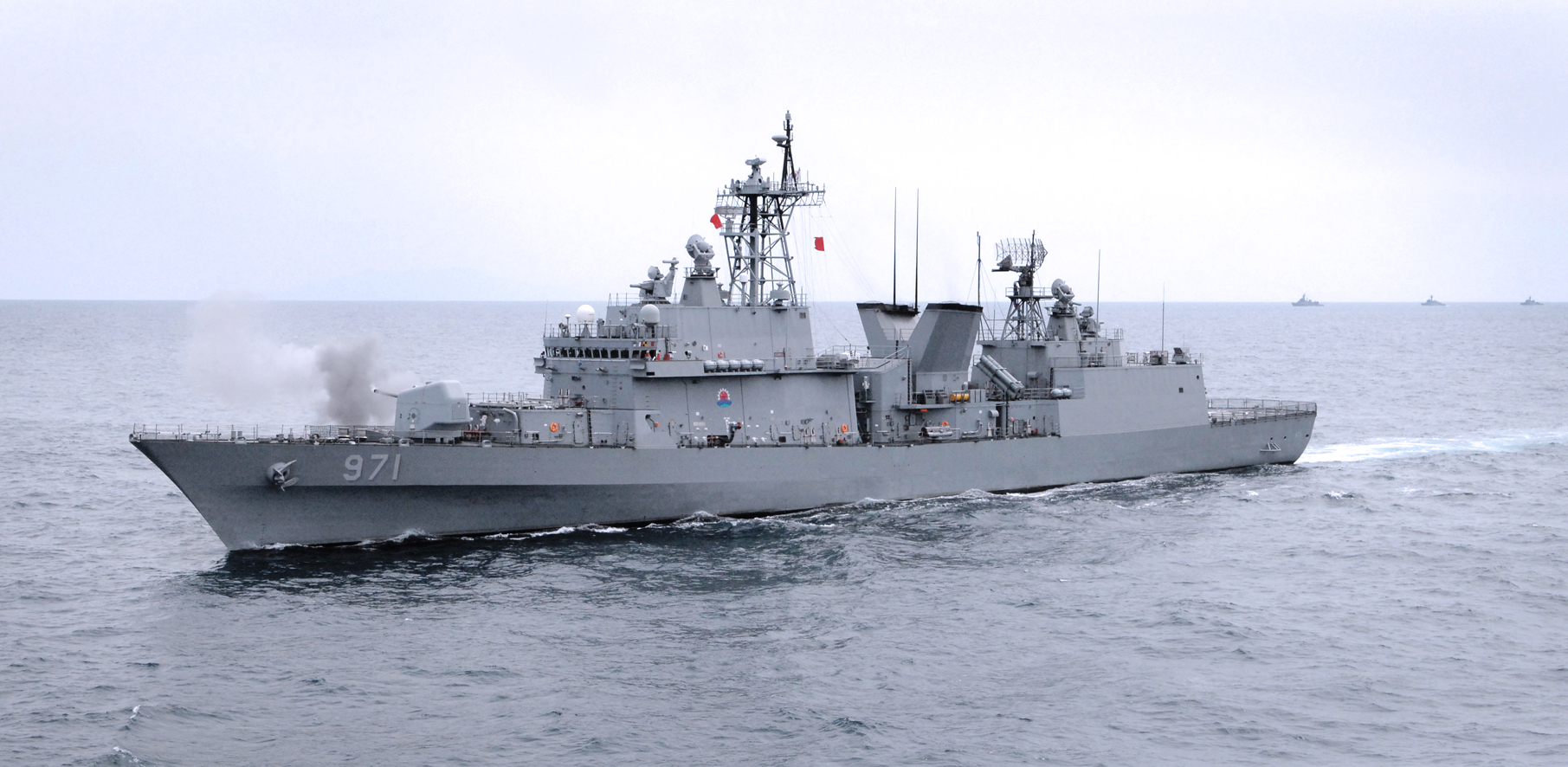
ROKS Gwanggaeto the Great

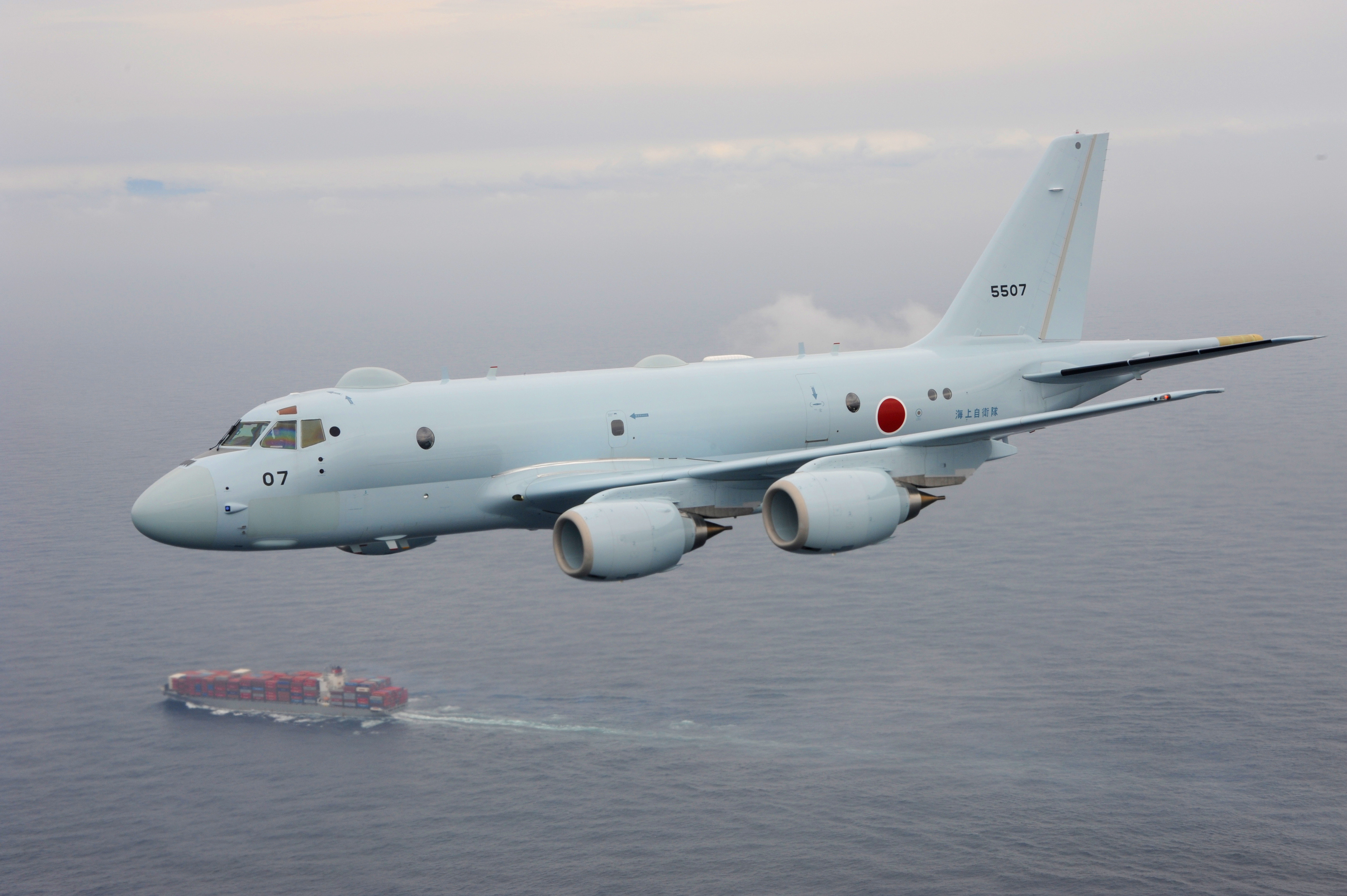
A Japanese Kawasaki P-1 maritime patrol aircraft

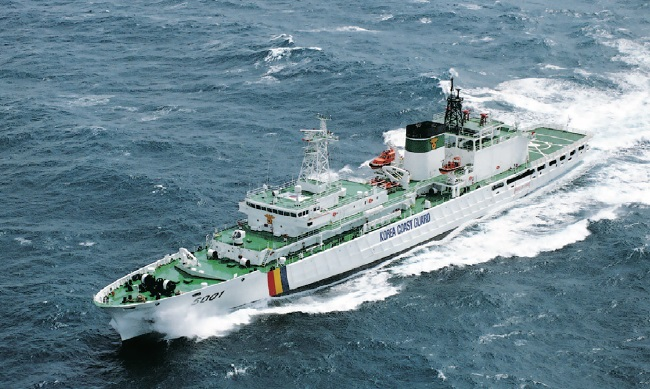
South Korean coast guard cutter Sambongho

=== 2018 ===
- On 20 December, a fishing vessel sent out a distress signal. The South Korean coast guard and South Korean navy deployed rescue ships. The North Korean fishing boat was a small wooden boat that weighed less than 1 ton with four or five North Koreans at the time of the rescue. It was reported that one or two of the North Koreans had already died at the time of the rescue. The Korea Coast Guard and South Korean navy operated a radar to assist in the rescue. The Japanese Ministry of Defense (MOD) claimed a Kawasaki P-1 maritime patrol aircraft from Fleet Air Wing 4 of the JMSDF was irradiated several times for a few minutes by a destroyer of the Republic of Korea Navy with a FCR. The incident occurred off the Noto Peninsula within a joint fishing zone of the two countries, surrounded by Japan's exclusive economic zone, away from the disputed Liancourt Rocks. After receiving the radiation, the P-1 patrol aircraft tried repeatedly to contact the other party by radio to ascertain their intentions, but got no response from the South Korean naval ship. According to South Korea, the audio communication the Japanese P-1 patrol aircraft attempted to transmit contained severe static and thus the South Korean warship could not discern the message.
- On 21 December, the Japanese Minister of Defense, Takeshi Iwaya, held a press conference to clarify the facts of the incident. While he told the reporters that the intention of the South Korean side was not clearly understood, he criticized the incident as an extremely dangerous action.
- On 22 December, the Japanese MOD conducted a careful and detailed analysis of the incident, and concluded that the irradiation was from STIR-180, which is unsuitable for broad searches. Accordingly, the MOD stated that irradiation with an FCR was a very dangerous action that could lead to unexpected contingencies. Even though it had been searching for a ship in distress, it greatly endangered other ships and aircraft in the vicinity. The Code for Unplanned Encounters at Sea (CUES), which both Japan and South Korea have adopted, suggests avoiding any radar irradiation from an FCR to aim at ships and aircraft. For these reasons, Japan strongly requested South Korea prevent any recurrence of the incident.
- On 22 December, South Korean Ministry of National Defense (MND) announced that they did not use the FCR (STIR-180) but it was operating an MW08 radar with the surveillance and tracking functions. The South Korean MND also claimed that there was no intent to aim it at the Japanese aircraft.
- On 23 December, the South Korean MND argued that it had already explained its position to Japan and would strive harder to ensure that there would not be any "misunderstanding".
- On 23 December, the Japanese Minister of Foreign Affairs, Tarō Kōno, withheld any direct criticism, and announced that he would like to ask the South Korean government to respond to the incident in order to prevent relations between Japan and South Korea deteriorating.
- On 24 December, the Director-General of the Asian and Oceanian Affairs Bureau of the Japanese Ministry of Foreign Affairs, Kenji Kanasugi, visited the South Korean Ministry of Foreign Affairs to express Japan's strong regret and make a request for the prevention of the recurrence of this kind of incident. The South Korean government continuously denied the usage of STIR-180 while admitting the usage of MW08 for the rescue. After a statement of the South Korean government, Takeshi Iwaya pointed out at a press conference that the South Korean government had some misunderstandings about the incident, and published a statement by the Japanese MOD that the maritime patrol aircraft had been repeatedly irradiated with electromagnetic waves characteristic of a FCR continuously for certain periods.
- On 26 December, a member of the South Korean minor progressive Justice Party accused the Japanese government, particularly the ruling Liberal Democratic Party, of "trying to antagonize South Korea by making up the allegation that the radar was pointed at the patrol plane."
- On 27 December, Japan and South Korea held working-level teleconference over this issue between Mr. Hidehiro Ikematsu (Joint Staff Principal Councilor of the Japanese MOD) and Major General Kim Jeong-yoo (Operations Director of the South Korean JCS), etc. According to the informed sources of the South Korean military, Both JMSDF and ROKN proposed to bring data received by Japanese aircraft and information on radar equipped by South Korean destroyers, but they failed to meet an agreement due to security problem. According to the release of the South Korean MND, the defense authorities of the two nations "exchanged opinions regarding the truth and technical analysis to remove misunderstandings.", and agreed "to continue consultations on the matter. In case the two sides fail to settle the conflict through working-level talks, higher-level meetings could be held later"
- On 28 December, the Japanese MOD released a video taken by the maritime patrol aircraft during the incident. The video shows that a crewmember asked the destroyer in English several times via three frequencies (international VHF [156.8 MHz] and emergency frequencies 121.5 MHz and 243 MHz) about the FC antenna directed at the P-1, but the destroyer stayed silent. The video also shows the gray destroyer sailing near a pair of rubber boats and a North Korean vessel. Sankei Shimbun reported that Japanese Prime Minister Abe had directed Japanese Defense Minister Takeshi Iwaya to release the video publicly, though the Defense Minister was reluctant to release the video, worrying about a possible backlash from South Korea. The South Korean MND expressed deep concerns and regrets over Japan's release of video footage related to an ongoing military radar spat just one day after two governments started a "working level conference" on 27 December, and accused Tokyo of releasing "inaccurate" facts. The South Korean MND argued that "The video material released by Japan contains only footage of the Japanese patrol plane circling above the surface of the sea and the (audio) conversation between the pilots and it cannot by common sense be regarded as objective evidence supporting the Japanese claims. There's no change to the fact that our military did not operate tracking radar on a Japanese patrol plane."

=== 2019 ===
- On 2 January, the South Korean MND released a statement demanding an apology from Japan that the P-1 patrol aircraft was flying dangerously low over their naval destroyer.
- On 4 January, Japanese Foreign Minister Taro Kono and South Korean Foreign Minister Kang Kyung-wha agreed over a phone conference to resolve the issue through "consultations between their military authorities". The South Korean MND released a video criticizing Japan for the low flying altitude of the maritime patrol aircraft. The video also claimed that the South Korean destroyer did not illuminate any tracking radar. The video mainly consists of the materials released by the Japanese MOD a week before.
- On 8 January, Japanese Defense Minister Takeshi Iwaya repeatedly commented that Japan would be able to exchange radar wave records with the South Korean military to deepen discussion with South Korea.
- On 14 January, Japan and South Korea held a conference at Singapore. At this conference, some of misunderstandings were explained like the communication, later found that the communication personnel in the destroyer had misheard the radio communication. Both countries suggested to analyze recorded data together, but they did not reach an agreement on major issues: about the usage of the radar and the threatening flight. The radar problem couldn't be resolved; the dissatisfaction of Japanese side about the radar was that Japan was asked to present the record of the RWR record first, not exchanging the records of both countries at the same time to avoid forgery, and the discontent of Korean side was that the Japan will show only a part of the P-1's record, excluding received frequencies, while the South Korean side was asked to disclose entire radars' specification and frequencies of the destroyer. About the matter of the threatening flight, Japan claimed "the MSDF P-1 maintained (even at its closet flight) a sufficiently safe altitude (approx.150m) and distance (approx. 500m) from the ROK destroyer" and requested South Korea for the objective evidence to support their claim, but South Korea had failed to provide such evidence and had repeatedly responded “if the subject of the threat feels threatened, it is then a threat," while the South Korean MND claimed that "safe altitude (approx.150m) and distance (approx. 500m)" is based on ICAO applying to civil flight, not a flight made by a government. They also claimed that when flights with altitude and distance admitted by Japanese were made to Japanese ship, JMSDF would also protest. Although Japanese MOD replied that they would not protest against it, Japan did not acknowledge it as an official statement when South Korean representatives asked whether they can declare it internationally. Both Japan and South Korea promised to hold further negotiations.
- On 21 January, Japanese MOD released the final statement regarding this incident including the location-relationship-diagram and the sound file of the radar reception (also known as RWR records). Japanese MOD also pointed out that this sound file evidence (RWR records) was rejected to be examined by the South Korean MND at the time of working-level consultations held on 14 January. After Japan's final statement, Choi hyon-su, official spokesperson of the South Korean MND, on the official regular briefing, stated "(from the sound records released on January 21) We couldn't interpret the sound records since we were not passed conversion logs for the records from Japan, and RWR reception record cannot exactly prove the usage of STIR-180 since various radars were used at the time, like Kelvin radar making similar frequencies, using I-band, in Sambongho, Korea Coast Guard's vessel, and MW08 that can be identified as FC radar, that could have confused P-1's ESM recorder." Japan declared there would be no more working-level consultations while the South Korean MND suggesting further joint investigations comparing each countries' data.
Fire-control Radar Detection Sound released by the Japan Ministry of Defense on January 21

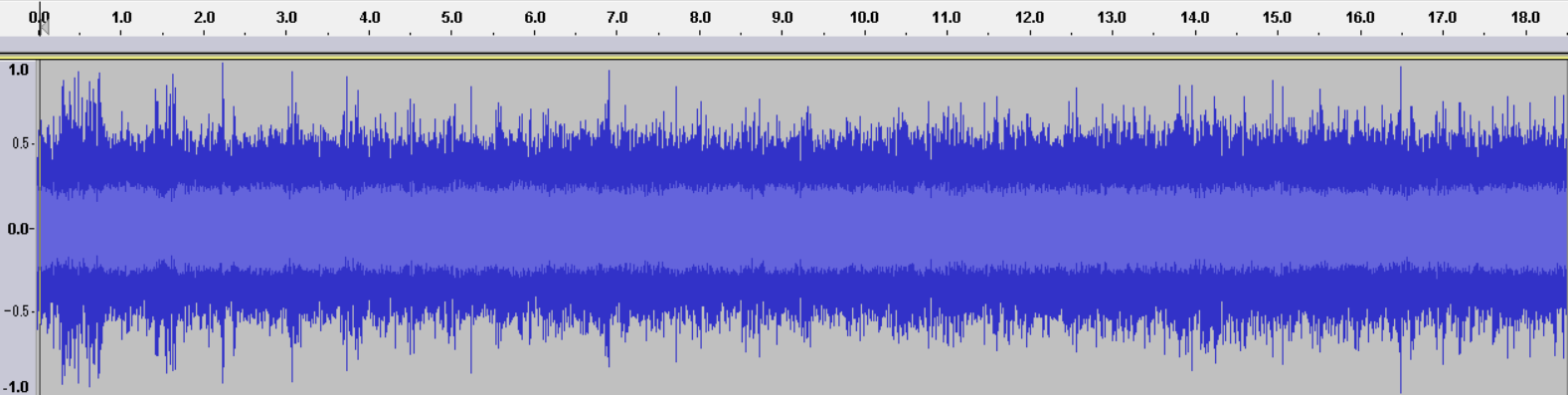
The waveform of Fire-control Radar Detection Sound released by the Japan Ministry of Defense on January 21 (parts of the sound were processed for information security). This waveform shows the Pulse repetition frequency is approximately 7kHz and Conical scanning frequency is approximately 100Hz. In this incident, AN/UPX-27K IFF, STIR-180, and MW08 can make this type of waveform.

Search Radar Detection Sound released by the Japan Ministry of Defense on January 21

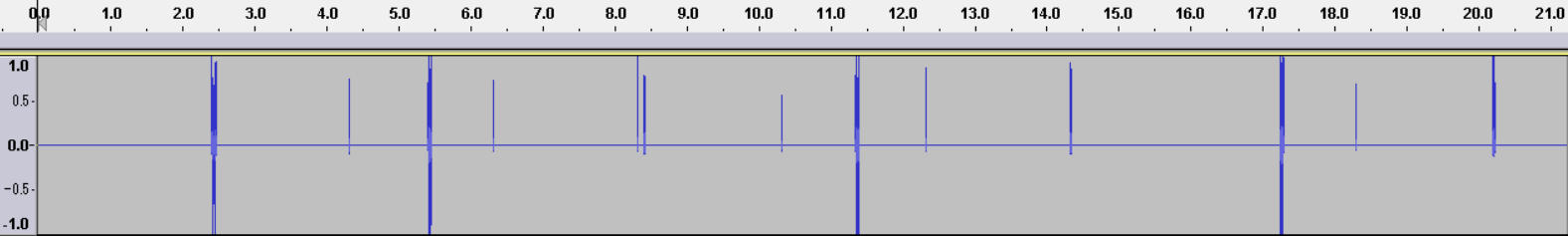
Waveform of Search Radar Detection Sound. This signal is clearly distinguished from Fire-control Radar signal. X-band and R-band radars equipped in the coast guard's vessel leave this type of waveform.

- On 22 January, the South Korean MND released the formal statement summarizing their previous arguments explaining issues about the radar and the flight. The South Korean MND stated "The fundamental nature of this issue is the JMSDF patrol aircraft's threatening low-altitude flight towards the ROK Navy vessel that had been conducting a humanitarian rescue operation. ... We express our deepest regrets to Japan for discontinuing the working-level meetings without providing any decisive evidence. Along with the solid ROK-US Combined Defense Posture, our government will continue its efforts to strengthen security cooperation between the ROK and Japan despite the current incident."
- On 23 January, according to the South Korean MND, a Japanese patrol aircraft flew at an altitude of 200–230 feet (61–70 m) within 1,800 feet (550 m) of a South Korean naval vessel on the afternoon of 23 January off Socotra Rock (Iŏdo) in the Yellow Sea, which lies some 100 miles (160 km) southeast of the South Korean island, Jeju. The South Korean military called this action a "clear provocation" that "if such activity repeats again, our military will respond strongly based on our response rules." The Japanese Defense Minister denied the allegation, saying "the altitude of the Japanese aircraft claimed by Korea, 200–230 feet (61–70 m), is not accurate, we are properly recording our flight. The Japanese aircraft was flying higher than altitude of 150 meters, following the international and domestic law. Japan Chief Cabinet Secretary Yoshihide Suga encouraged better communication between the military forces of the two countries.
- On 24 January, the South Korean MND released 5 pictures taken by a camcorder and a thermal camera connected with a radar in the destroyer with recorded height and distance of the patrol plane. The South Korean MND explained that it detected the exact altitude and distance using a maritime surveillance radar. Japan stated that (regarding the photo with Japanese patrol aircraft P3C) it does not prove the altitude of the aircraft since the surface of the sea is not included in the picture.
- On 25 January, the spokesperson of the South Korean MND, Choi hyon-su stated, "If Japan cannot trust our radar data that we revealed in yesterday, Japan should suggest more reliable evidence." Japan stated "We have no reason or intention to threaten Korea's destroyer. If the two approaches, our patrol aircraft is not armed and the other is the destroyer, the unarmed will feel more threatened"
- On 27 January, the South Korean Minister of National Defense Jeong Kyeong-doo declared, "If we judge that Japan performed a provocative act again, we will respond strongly based on our domestic law," suggesting the use of weapons.
- In February 2019, the ROKN was issued specific "Guidelines for responding to Japanese patrol planes", supplementing a set of more general "Guidelines for responding to aircraft from third countries" that had been adopted in January. The generic rules of engagement compiled by the South Korean military establishment had stipulated a four-step process in which aircraft that fly too close to an ROKN vessel are to be identified and then issued two successively harsher warnings by radio. However, the Blue House insisted on stronger measures specifically for Japanese planes, adding a fifth step in which aircraft that ignore the warnings are to be illuminated with fire-control radar. This caused consternation within the South Korean military, as it delegates too much authority and increases the risk of military conflict by leaving the decision to take potentially escalatory actions to the discretion of field commanders. Furthermore, it created a paradoxical situation, prescribing more severe measures against Japanese aircraft than those of Russia and China, countries that have previously violated South Korean airspace and made incursions into its air defense identification zone respectively.
- On 1 June, Japanese Defense Minister Takeshi Iwaya expressed his decision to end talks about the dispute to the South Korean Minister of National Defense Jeong Kyeong-doo. While both defense ministers could not reach a conclusion together, both have pledged to make to efforts to improve relations between the two countries.

=== 2022 ===
On 17 November 2022, the ROK Navy claimed that it had not irradiated radar.

=== 2023 ===
On 4 June 2023, Japanese Defense Minister Yasukazu Hamada and South Korean Defense Minister Lee Jong-sup held talks as part of the Shangri-La Dialogue in Singapore and agreed to accelerate working-level discussions to resolve the radar dispute, with a focus on outlining "steps to prevent a recurrence".

=== 2024 ===
On 2 June 2024, Japanese Defense Minister Minoru Kihara and South Korean Defense Minister Shin Won-sik met on the sidelines of the Shangri-La Dialogue and agreed to normalize relations between their respective militaries and resume defense cooperation and exchanges. Characterizing the radar lock-on dispute as an obstacle to security cooperation between Japan and South Korea, as well as tripartite cooperation with the United States, the two countries released a document detailing measures to prevent a recurrence of the incident. In the document, the JMSDF and the South Korean navy undertook to comply with the Code for Unplanned Encounters at Sea, and agreed to improve communications and build trust. No mention was made regarding the exact chain of events in the 2018 incident, effectively putting the matter to rest.

== Views and opinions ==
Toshio Tamogami, a retired general and ex–chief of staff of the JASDF, has given his views on Twitter denying the offensiveness of aiming FC radar. However, Toshiyuki Ito, a retired JMSDF admiral and ex-commandant of the Joint Staff College, rebutted Tamogami's view since the former had been retired for ten years and has no experience as a pilot.

The South Korean government claimed this flight of P-1 was menacing and unfriendly to the warship of a neighboring country which was operating a rescue mission in the high seas. According to the South Korean government, it was Japan and not South Korea that acted improperly in this incident and should apologize. However, Paul Giarra, a retired U.S. naval aviator and ex-senior Country Director for Japan in the Office of the ASD (ISA), pointed it out that there was absolutely no danger in the actions of the Japanese aircraft.

Some South Korean media were concerned about the friction between Seoul and Tokyo. On 7 January 2019, a JoongAng Daily editorial argued that the two governments "should join forces to address the nuclear threats from North Korea and other urgent issues" and that "This emotional fighting does not help. Though what really happened at the moment has not yet been found, either side did not suffer substantial damage. Therefore, if [the South] Korean destroyer really aimed its FCR at the approaching airplane, our military authorities should apologize to Japan and wrap up the case. If the Japanese aircraft was really confused about the radar signal, it should apologize", and that "[i]t is time to take a deep breath and find a reasonable solution".

While there is no international law regulating the altitude of military flights, Japan, the U.S. military, and NATO assert they follow the custom of the International Civil Aviation Organization (ICAO) to keep a distance of 150 meters (490 ft) from vessels under normal operations.

== See also ==
- 2013 Chinese naval radar lock-on incident
- Iran Air Flight 655
