= Treaties and Other International Acts Series =

The Treaties and Other International Acts Series (TIAS) are a series of pamphlets or slip treaties published by the United States Department of State under the authority of the United States Secretary of State. Pub. L. 89–497, 80 Stat. 271, enacted July 8, 1966, codified at 1 U.S.C. § 113, mentions them as alternatives to the edition of the laws and treaties of the United States published by Little and Brown and publications of the laws of the United States issued under the authority of the Archivist of the United States. Regulations on reporting are contained at 22 CFR 181.

They replaced the Treaty Series (TS or USTS), issued singly in pamphlets until 1945, and the Executive Agreement Series (EAS), issued singly in pamphlets until 1945.

== See also ==
- United States Treaties and Other International Agreements (UST)
- Treaty series
