= Title 1 of the United States Code =

United States legal code section

Title 1 of the United States Code outlines the general provisions of the United States Code.

== Chapter 1 ==
Chapter 1: Rules of Construction

- § 1 (Dictionary Act) – Words denoting number, gender, person, etc.
- § 2 – "County" as including "parish," etc.
- § 3 – "Vessel" as including all means of water transportation.
- § 4 – "Vehicle" as including all means of land transportation.
- § 5 – "Company" or "association" as including successors and assigns.
- § 6 – Limitation of term "products of American fisheries."
- § 7 – Definition of "marriage" and "spouse". (See Respect for Marriage Act)
- § 8 – "Person", "human being", "child", and "individual" as including born-alive infant. (See Born-Alive Infants Protection Act.)

== Chapter 2 ==
Chapter 2: Acts and Resolutions; Formalities of Enactment; Repeals; Sealing of Instruments

- § 101 – Enacting clause.
- § 102 – Resolving clause.
- § 103 – Enacting or resolving words after first section.
- § 104 – Numbering of sections; single proposition.
- § 105 – Title of appropriation Acts.
- § 106 – Printing bills and joint resolutions.
- § 106a – Promulgation of laws.
- § 106b – Amendments to Constitution.
- § 107 – Parchment or paper for printing enrolled bills or resolutions.
- § 108 – Repeal of repealing act.
- § 109 – Repeal of statutes as affecting existing liabilities.
- § 110 – Saving clause of Revised Statutes.
- § 111 – Repeals as evidence of prior effectiveness.
- § 112 – Statutes at Large; contents; admissibility in evidence.
- § 112a – United States Treaties and Other International Agreements; contents; admissibility in evidence.
- § 112b – United States international agreements; transmission to the United States Congress.
- § 113 – "Little and Brown's" edition of laws and treaties; slip laws; Treaties and Other International Act 1 Series; admissibility in evidence.
- § 114 – Sealing of instruments.

== Chapter 3 ==
Chapter 3: Code of Laws of the United States and Supplements; District of Columbia Code and Supplements

- § 201 – Publication and distribution of Code of Laws of United States and Supplements and District of Columbia Code and Supplements.
- § 202 – Preparation and publication of Codes and Supplements.
- § 203 – District of Columbia Code; preparation and publication; cumulative supplements.
- § 204 – Codes and Supplements as evidence of the laws of United States and District of Columbia; citation of Codes and Supplements.
- § 205 – Codes and Supplement; where printed; form and style; ancillaries.
- § 206 – Bills and resolutions of Committee on the Judiciary of House of Representatives; form and style; ancillaries; curtailment of copies.
- § 207 – Copies of acts and resolutions in slip form; additional number printed for Committee on the Judiciary of House of Representatives.
- § 208 – Delegation of function of Committee on the Judiciary to other agencies; printing, etc., under direction of Joint Committee on Printing.
- § 209 – Copies of Supplements to Code of Laws of United States and of District of Columbia Code and Supplements; conclusive evidence of original.
- § 210 – Distribution of Supplements to Code of Laws of United States and of District of Columbia Code and Supplements; slip and pamphlet copies.
- § 211 – Copies to Members of Congress.
- § 212 – Additional distribution at each new Congress.
- § 213 – Appropriation for preparing and editing supplements.

== History ==
Title I was originally passed by the 80th Congress in 1947, along with titles 3, 4, 6, 9, & 17. Chapter 1 was influenced by the "Dictionary Act" passed in the 41st Congress.
