= Code for Unplanned Encounters at Sea =

2014 agreement on maritime incidents

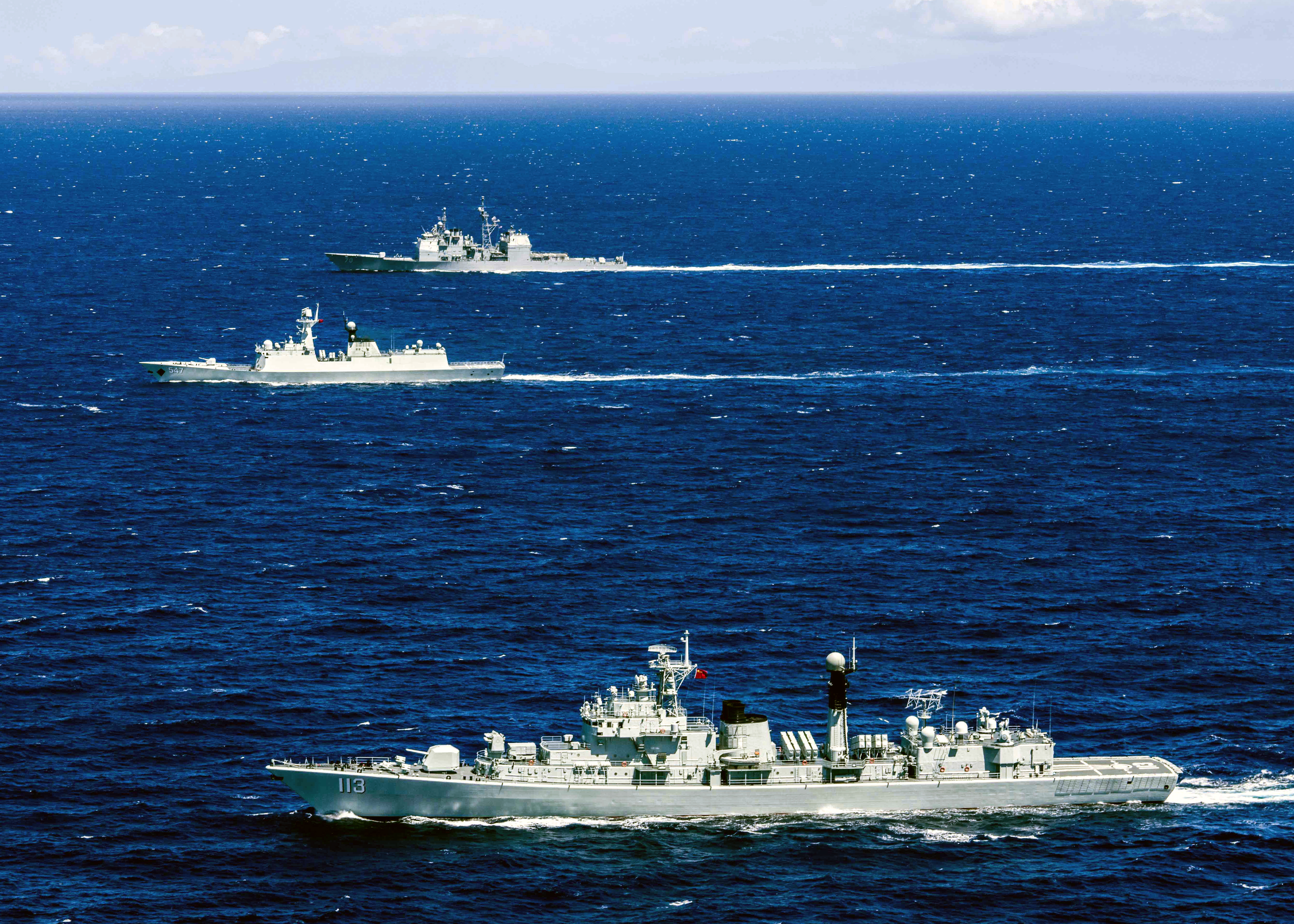
Chinese and United States warships sailing together during a training exercise off Hawaii in 2013. Both countries signed the Code for Unplanned Encounters at Sea in 2014.

The Code for Unplanned Encounters at Sea (CUES) is an agreement reached at the 2014 Western Pacific Naval Symposium to reduce the chance of an incident at sea between the countries in the agreement, and — in the event that one occurs — to prevent it from escalating. Twenty-one countries have joined the agreement, including Australia, Brunei, Cambodia, Canada, Chile, China, France, Indonesia, Japan, Malaysia, New Zealand, Papua New Guinea, Peru, the Philippines, Russia, Singapore, South Korea, Thailand, Tonga, the United States and Vietnam. Taiwan, a non-signatory state also reportedly implements the agreement.

CUES had been proposed a decade earlier, but China opposed earlier versions, because of references to potential legal standing.

== History ==
In December 2014, the People's Liberation Army Navy and the United States Navy practiced CUES during an anti-piracy exercise in the Gulf of Aden.

During her 2015 deployment to the South China Sea, USS Fort Worth encountered several warships of the People's Liberation Army Navy, putting the new CUES rules into practice in a "professional" manner.

== Provisions ==
CUES is an agreement, but it is not legally binding.

Erik French of the Center for Strategic and International Studies has said that the voluntary nature of CUES and its limitation to purely military naval forces limit its usefulness in the Asia Pacific region.

The agreement discourages aviators from making "unfriendly physical gestures" towards one another.

== See also ==
- U.S.–Soviet Incidents at Sea agreement
- 2018 Japan–South Korea radar lock-on dispute
