= Slip law =

Individual Act of Congress; one type for publication

In the United States, a slip law is an individual Act of Congress which is either a public law (Pub.L.) or a private law (Pvt.L.). Slip laws are published as softcover unbound pamphlets, each with its own individual pagination. They are part of a three-part model for publication of federal statutes consisting of slip laws, session laws, and codification. Session laws are compiled into the Statutes at Large (Stat.), and codification results in the United States Code (U.S.C.).

Public and private laws are prepared and published by the Office of the Federal Register (OFR) of the National Archives and Records Administration (NARA). At the end of a Congressional session, slip laws are compiled into the Statutes at Large, which are called "session laws", published by the Government Printing Office (GPO). Today, most of the public laws, but not private laws, are drafted as amendments to the United States Code.

== See also ==
- United States Statutes at Large
- United States Code
