= Act of Congress =

Bill of the United States Congress signed into law by the president

In the United States, an act of Congress is a statute passed by both the Senate and the House of Representatives of the United States Congress and signed into law by the president. (Note: If the president veteos the legislation, Congress may override it with a two-thirds vote in both chambers in which the bill becomes law without presidential action.) Acts may apply only to individual entities (called private laws), or to the general public (public laws).

For a bill to become an act, the text must pass through both houses with a majority, then be either signed into law by the president of the United States, be left unsigned for ten days (excluding Sundays) while Congress remains in session, or, if vetoed by the president, receive a congressional override from 2/3 of both houses.

== Public law, private law, designation ==
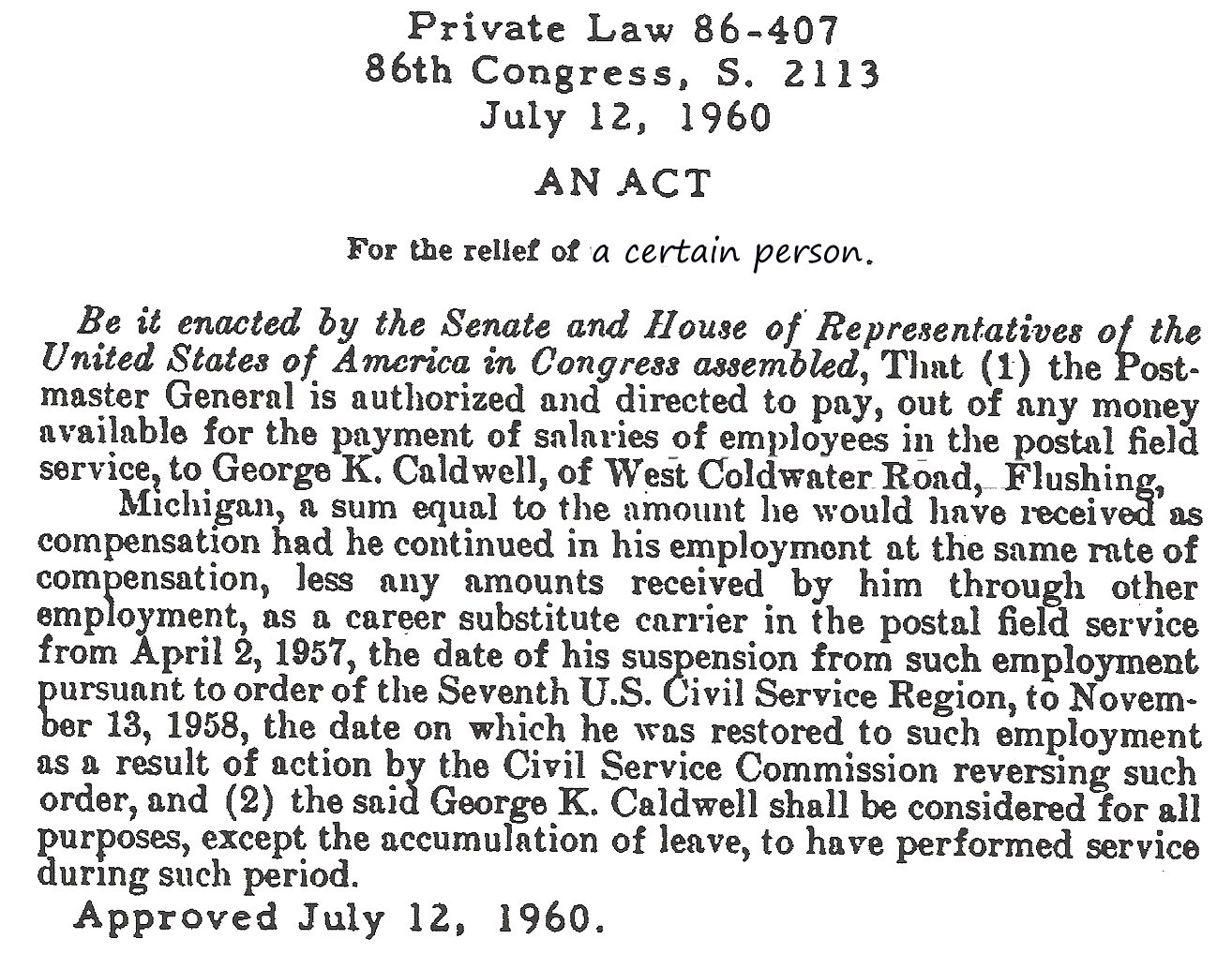
Private Law 86–407

Part of Public Law 86–90

In the United States, acts of Congress are designated as either public laws, relating to the general public, or private laws, relating to specific institutions or individuals. Since 1957, all acts of Congress have been designated as "Public Law X–Y" or "Private Law X–Y". X is the number of the Congress and Y refers to the sequential order of the bill (when it was enacted). For example, P. L. 111–5 (American Recovery and Reinvestment Act of 2009) was the fifth enacted public law of the 111th United States Congress. Public laws are also often abbreviated as Pub. L. No. X–Y.

When the legislation of those two kinds are proposed, it is called public bill and private bill respectively.

== Usage ==
The word "act", as used in the term "act of Congress", is a common, not a proper noun. The capitalization of the word "act" (especially when used standing alone to refer to an act mentioned earlier by its full name) is deprecated by some dictionaries and usage authorities. However, the Bluebook requires "Act" to be capitalized when referring to a specific legislative act. The United States Code capitalizes "act".

The term "act of Congress" is sometimes used in informal speech to indicate something for which getting permission is burdensome. For example, "It takes an act of Congress to get a building permit in this town."

== Promulgation (United States) ==
An act adopted by simple majorities in both houses of Congress is promulgated, or given the force of law, in one of the following ways:

1. Signature by the president of the United States,
2. Inaction by the president after ten days from reception, excluding Sundays, while the Congress is in session, or
3. Reconsideration by the Congress after a presidential veto during its session. A bill must receive a 2/3 majority vote in both houses to override a president's veto.

The president promulgates acts of Congress made by the first two methods. If an act is made by the third method, the presiding officer of the house that last reconsidered the act promulgates it.

Under the United States Constitution, if the president does not return a bill or resolution to Congress with objections before the time limit expires, then the bill automatically becomes an act. If the Congress is adjourned at the end of this period, then the bill dies and cannot be reconsidered (see pocket veto). If the president rejects a bill or resolution while the Congress is in session, a two-thirds vote of both houses of Congress is needed for reconsideration to be successful.

Promulgation in the sense of publishing and proclaiming the law is accomplished by the president, or the relevant presiding officer in the case of an overridden veto, delivering the act to the archivist of the United States. The archivist provides for its publication as a slip law and in the United States Statutes at Large after receiving the act. Thereafter, the changes are published in the United States Code.

== Judicial review and constitutionality ==
Through the process of judicial review, an act of Congress that violates the Constitution may be declared unconstitutional by the courts. A judicial declaration that an act of Congress is unconstitutional does not remove the act from the Statutes at Large or the United States Code; rather, it prevents the act from being enforced. However, the act as published in annotated codes and legal databases is marked with annotations indicating that it is no longer good law.

== See also ==
- Legislation
- List of United States federal legislation for a list of prominent Acts of Congress.
- Procedures of the United States Congress
- Act of parliament
- Entry into force
- Federal Register
