= United States Statutes at Large =

Official record of Acts of Congress and concurrent resolutions

- Title page of volume 125
- Type: Session laws, official journal and treaty series
- Publisher: Office of the Federal Register
- Founded: 1845
- Language: English
- Headquarters: United States

The United States Statutes at Large, commonly referred to as the Statutes at Large and abbreviated Stat., are an official record of Acts of Congress and concurrent resolutions passed by the United States Congress.

Each act and resolution of Congress is originally published as a slip law, which is classified as either public law (abbreviated Pub.L.) or private law (Pvt.L.), and designated and numbered accordingly. At the end of a congressional session, the statutes enacted during that session are compiled into bound books, known as "session law" publications. The United States Statutes at Large is the name of the session law publication for U.S. Federal statutes. The public laws and private laws are numbered and organized in chronological order.

U.S. Federal statutes are published in a three-part process, consisting of slip laws, session laws (Statutes at Large), and codification (United States Code).

== Codification ==
Large portions of public laws are enacted as amendments to the United States Code. Once enacted into law, an Act will be published in the Statutes at Large and will add to, modify, or delete some part of the United States Code. Provisions of a public law that contain only enacting clauses, effective dates, and similar matters are not generally codified. Private laws also are not generally codified.

Some portions of the United States Code have been enacted as positive law and other portions have not been so enacted. In case of a conflict between the text of the Statutes at Large and the text of a provision of the United States Code that has not been enacted as positive law, the text of the Statutes at Large takes precedence.

== History ==
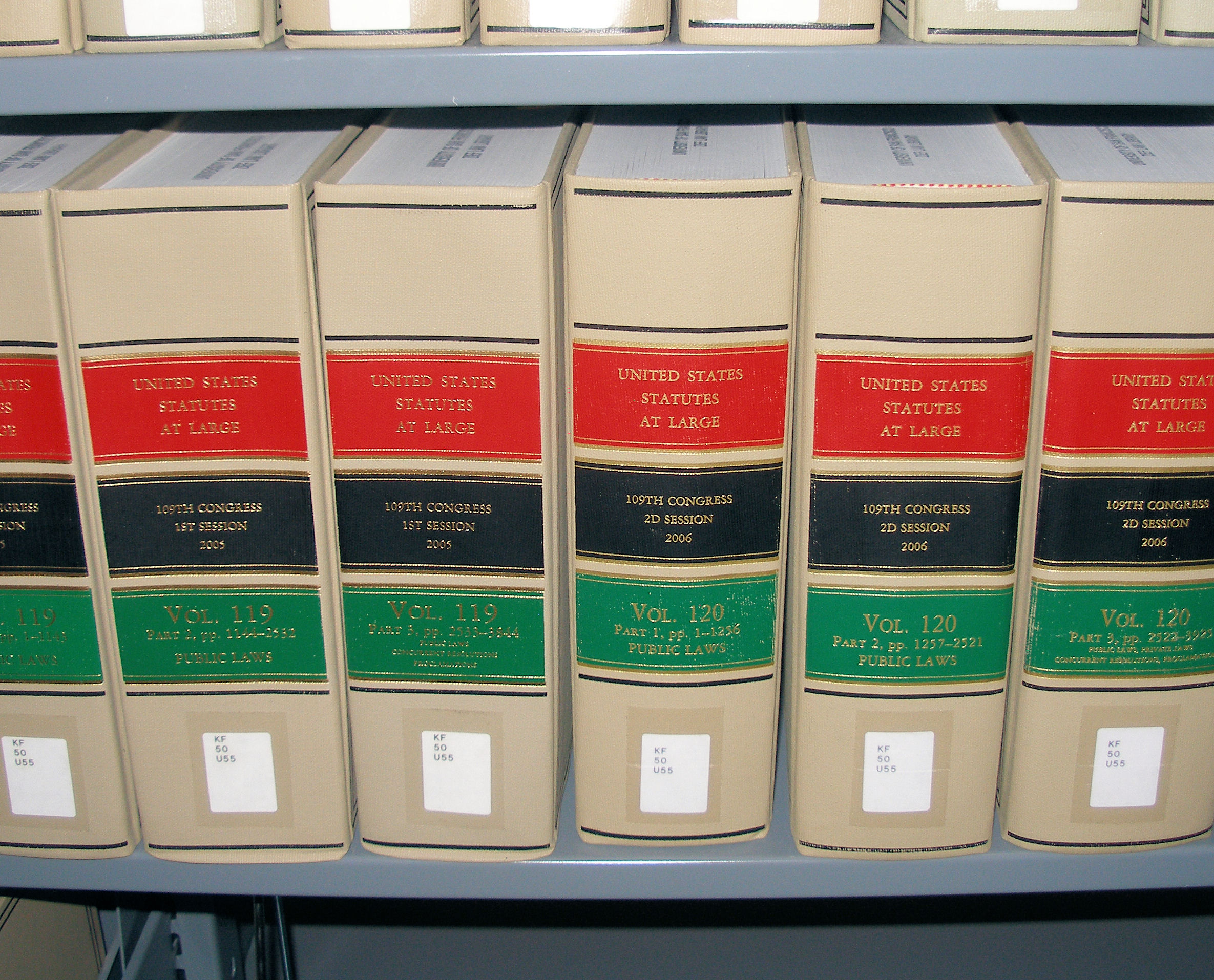
A few volumes of the Statutes at Large

Publication of the United States Statutes at Large began in 1845 by the private firm of Little, Brown and Company under authority of a joint resolution of Congress. During Little, Brown and Company's time as publisher, Richard Peters (Volumes 1–8), George Minot (Volumes 9–11), and George P. Sanger (Volumes 11–17) served as editors.

In 1874, Congress transferred the authority to publish the Statutes at Large to the Government Printing Office under the direction of the Secretary of State.

Pub. L. 80–278, 61 Stat. 633, was enacted July 30, 1947 and directed the secretary of state to compile, edit, index, and publish the Statutes at Large. Pub. L. 81–821, 64 Stat. 980, was enacted September 23, 1950 and directed the administrator of general services to compile, edit, index, and publish the Statutes at Large. Since 1985 the Statutes at Large have been prepared and published by the Office of the Federal Register (OFR) of the National Archives and Records Administration (NARA).

Until 1948, all treaties and international agreements approved by the United States Senate were also published in the set, but these now appear in a publication titled United States Treaties and Other International Agreements, abbreviated U.S.T. In addition, the Statutes at Large includes the text of the Declaration of Independence, Articles of Confederation, the Constitution, amendments to the Constitution, treaties with Native American nations and foreign nations, and presidential proclamations.

Sometimes very large or long acts of Congress are published as their own "appendix" volume of the Statutes at Large. For example, the Internal Revenue Code of 1954 was published as volume 68A of the Statutes at Large (68A Stat. 3).

== See also ==
- California Statutes
- Federal Register
- Laws of Florida
- Laws of Illinois
- Laws of New York
- Laws of Pennsylvania
- Procedures of the United States Congress
- Revised Statutes of the United States
- United States Reports
