= Treaty series =

Officially published collection of international agreements

A treaty series is an officially published collection of treaties and other international agreements.

== United Nations ==
The United Nations Treaty Series (UNTS) is the result of article 102 of the Charter of the United Nations, which states as follows:

1. Every treaty and every international agreement entered into by any Member of the United Nations after the present Charter comes into force shall as soon as possible be registered with the Secretariat and published by it.
2. No party to any such treaty or international agreement which has not been registered in accordance with the provisions of paragraph 1 of this Article may invoke that treaty or agreement before any organ of the United Nations.

On 14 December 1946, the United Nations General Assembly passed resolution 97, which laid the rules for the registration of international agreements by the UN Secretariat.

The UNTS is by far the largest collection of treaties, running to over 3,000 volumes containing 158,000 treaties from 1946. Its predecessor was the League of Nations Treaty Series (LNTS).

The UNTS is published online as part of the United Nations Treaty Collection (UNTC)

The Search Tool is used to find teatries by U.N. Reference C.N. For example, for C.N.126.2018.TREATIES-XVIII.10, you can use the fields CN Year: 2018 and CN Number:126, to find:

Date of Issuance	CN Number	Participant	Action	Treaty Reference	Download PDF
08/03/2018	126	Formality	Amendment	XVIII-10-f	English / French

== Americas ==
=== Canada ===
Treaties in force for Canada are published in the Canada Treaty Series.

=== United States ===
Treaties and international agreements were formally published in Statutes at Large (Stat.) until 1948. The Department of State also published a number of collections relating specifically to treaties and other agreements:

- Foreign Relations of the United States (FRUS), published under various names since 1861
- Treaty Series (TS or USTS), issued singly in pamphlets until 1945
- Executive Agreement Series (EAS), issued singly in pamphlets until 1945
- Treaties and Other International Agreements of the United States of America 1776–1949 (Bevans), compiled by Charles I. Bevans for the State Department from 1968-1976

After 1948, agreements have been published as Senate Documents (S.Doc.), House Documents (H.Doc.) or in the Federal Register (F.R. or F.Reg.). Official compilations include:

- Treaties and Other International Acts Series (TIAS) are a series of pamphlets or "slip" treaties published by the Department of State to replace the Treaty Series and the Executive Agreement Series
- United States Treaties and Other International Agreements (UST) from accumulated TIAS pamphlets, published annually from 1950 to 1982.
- Foreign Relations of the United States (FRUS) continues to be published as a collection

For convenience, a number of private collections of treaties have also been published:

- International Legal Materials (ILM) published by The American Society of International Law (ASIL)
- Treaties and other International Acts of the United States of America (Miller), edited by David Hunter Miller

== Asia and Pacific ==
=== Australia ===
Australian treaties are collected together in the Australian Treaty Series (ATS), starting with the Treaty of Versailles, [1920] ATS 1.

=== Israel ===
The State of Israel has its own official collection of treaties, titled in Hebrew "Kitvey Amana" ("Treaty Writings" in Hebrew, also referred to as "Israel Treaty Series"). It includes every international agreement either signed or acceded to by the Israeli government.

=== New Zealand ===
New Zealand treaties are published in New Zealand Treaty Series (NZTS), starting publication from 1944.

=== Pacific Islands ===
The University of South Pacific in Port Vila, Vanuatu began a publication titled Pacific Islands Treaty Series, giving the texts of treaties concluded by small states in the Pacific Ocean.

== Europe ==
=== Council of Europe ===
The Council of Europe Treaty Series (CETS) was established in 1949.

=== Republic of Ireland ===
The Irish Department of Foreign Affairs has published a list of all treaties of Ireland on its website, titled Irish Treaty Series. At present, all treaties from 2002 are available online.

=== United Kingdom ===
United Kingdom treaties and international agreements are published as command papers, along with a large number of other government documents. For ease of reference, command papers relating to treaties are given a second "Treaty Series" number, which is sometimes referred to as the United Kingdom Treaty Series (UKTS). For example, the Treaty on Open Skies was published as Cm. 5537, but also had the Treaty Series number 26 for 2002, abbreviated as [2002] UKTS 26.

== Other ==
=== League of Nations ===
The League of Nations Treaty Series (LNTS) was a result of article 18 of the Covenant of the League of Nations, which stated:

Every treaty or international engagement entered into hereafter by any Member of the League shall be forthwith registered with the Secretariat and shall as soon as possible be published by it. No such treaty or international engagement shall be binding until so registered.

The LNTS began publication in 1920, and was terminated in 1946, following the dissolution of the League of Nations. It contains 205 volumes with a total of 4,834 treaties. A nine-volume index has been created.

Following the termination of that series, the registration of League of Nations treaties passed to the United Nations.

=== Organization of American States ===
The Organization of American States as part of its mandate under the auspice of the Inter-American Program for the Development of International Law within the OAS Secretariat for Legal Affairs (SLA) maintains a treaty series for member states which wish to participate under the scheme.

== See also ==
- Consolidated Treaty Series
