= Daikoku Seamount =

Submarine volcano in the Mariana Islands

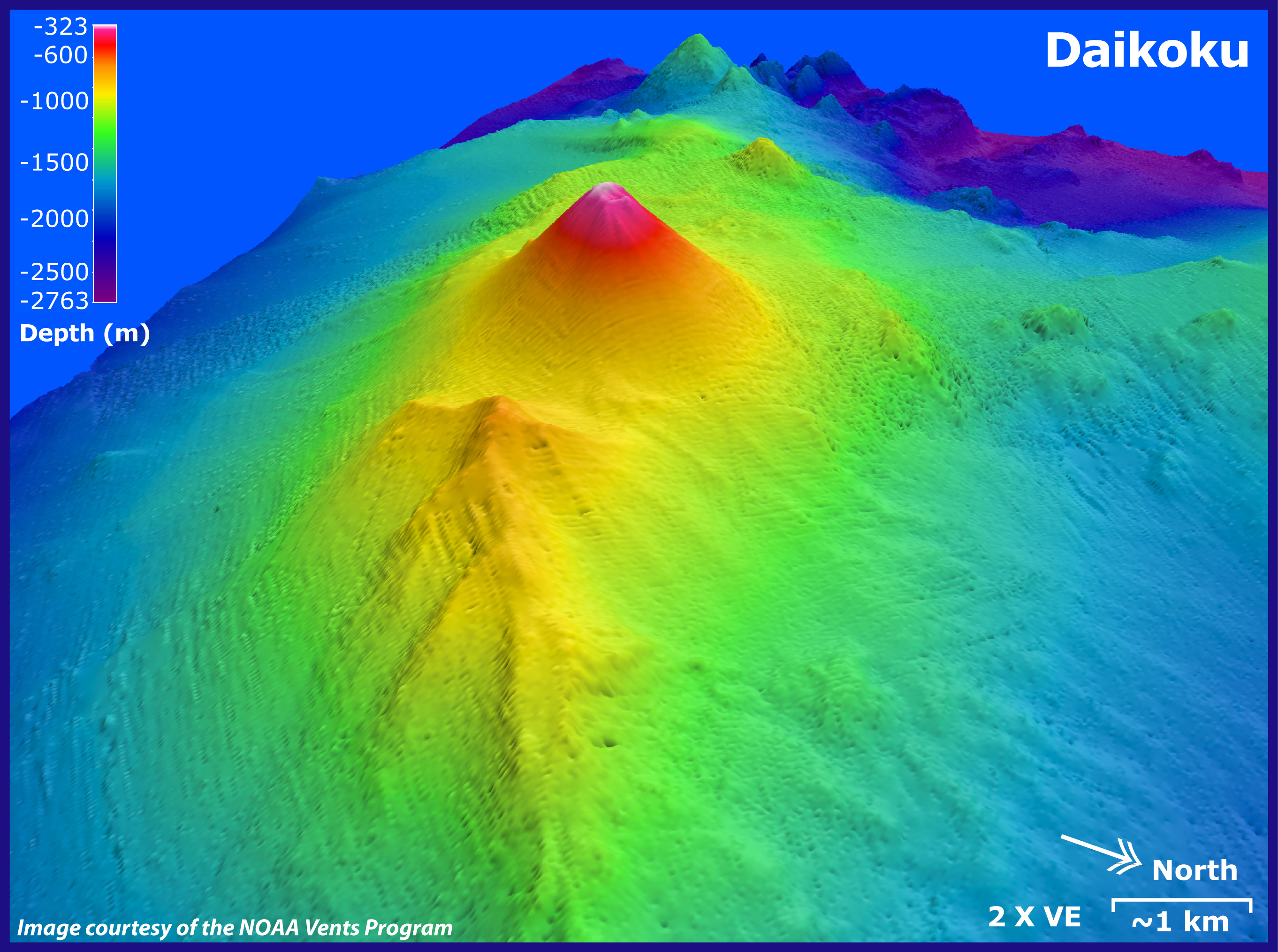
- Bathymetry map of Daikoku
- Summit depth: −323 m (−1,060 ft)
- Height: ~2,180 m (7,152 ft)

Location
- Range: Izu–Bonin–Mariana Arc
- Coordinates: 21°19′26″N 144°11′38″E
- Country: Northern Mariana Islands, United States

Geology
- Type: Stratovolcanoes
- Last eruption: 2014

Daikoku Seamount (Japanese: 大黒海山) is a submarine volcano located in the Northern Mariana Islands, in the western Pacific Ocean. It is situated on the Mariana volcanic arc. The seamount rises over 2,500 m (8,202 ft) meters from the seafloor, with its summit about 323 m (1,060 ft) below sea level. Since its discovery, the seamount has been studied by several expeditions, including expeditions made by NOAA, using various scientific tools, such as sonar mapping and remotely operated vehicles (ROVs). Daikoku Seamount hosts an active hydrothermal vent system that hosts diverse communities of deep-sea organisms, including tube worms, crabs, and snails. At the summit of the seamount, a crater filled with molten liquid sulfur called "Sulfur Cauldron" exists, which was discovered in 2006. In 2014, it was discovered in an expedition that the seamount had erupted, forming 2 new craters on the summit.

== Geography ==
The seamount is located around 850 km (528 mi) north of Guam in the Micronesia region of the Pacific Ocean, a region consisting of hundreds of islands. Morphologically, Daikoku is a volcanic cone sitting on top of an older caldera that has been almost completely filled during periods of volcanic activity. The modern cone of Daikoku rises around 700 m (2,297 ft) from the caldera base, at a depth of 1,050 m (3,445 ft), and has a 200 m (656 ft) wide summit crater that is slightly breached on the northwest side. On the summit is located a lake of molten sulfur, which has been called the "Sulfur Cauldron" and compared to the sulfur volcanism on Io, a moon of Jupiter. Such phenomenon has also been observed at Nikkō Seamount also in the Mariana Arc.

== Geologic setting ==
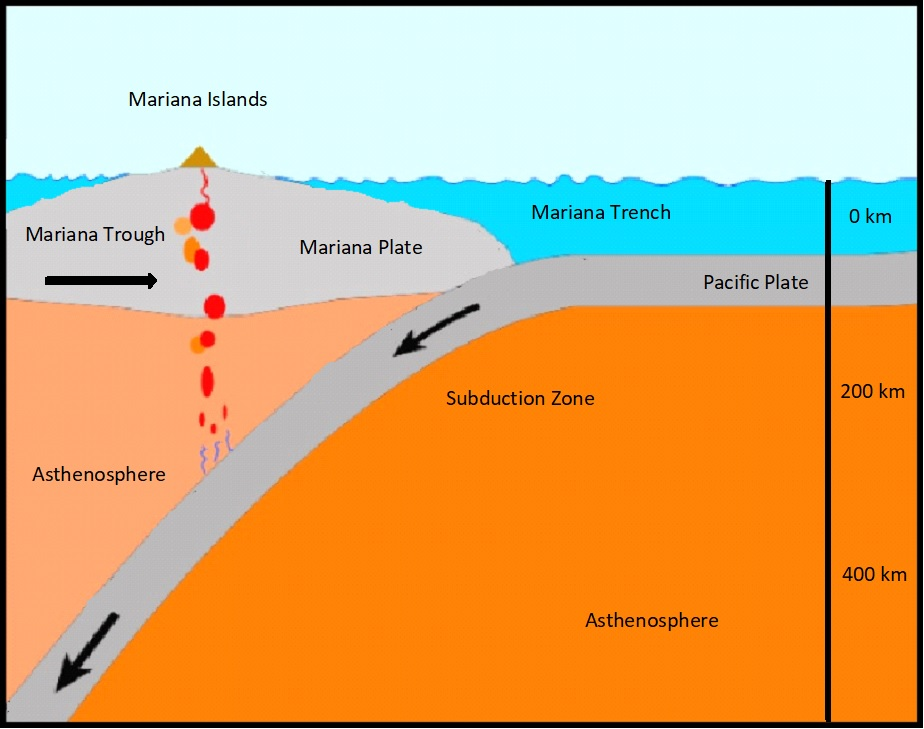
A diagram of subduction in the Mariana Islands

The seamount is located in the Mariana Island Arc, a volcanic island arc formed from magma generation in the process of subduction, in which a tectonic plate subsides under another plate. In this case, the Pacific Plate subducts beneath the Mariana Plate through the Mariana Trench, which is the deepest trench in the world. The typical type of volcanoes formed by this subduction are stratovolcanoes. Their structures consist of layers of volcanic ash, pumice, and other volcanic rocks.

Submarine arc volcanoes are the main route by which volatiles, including CO_{2} (carbon dioxide) and SO_{2} (sulfur dioxide), released from subducting plates return to the ocean and make up a part of the oceanic volatile budget.

== Fauna ==
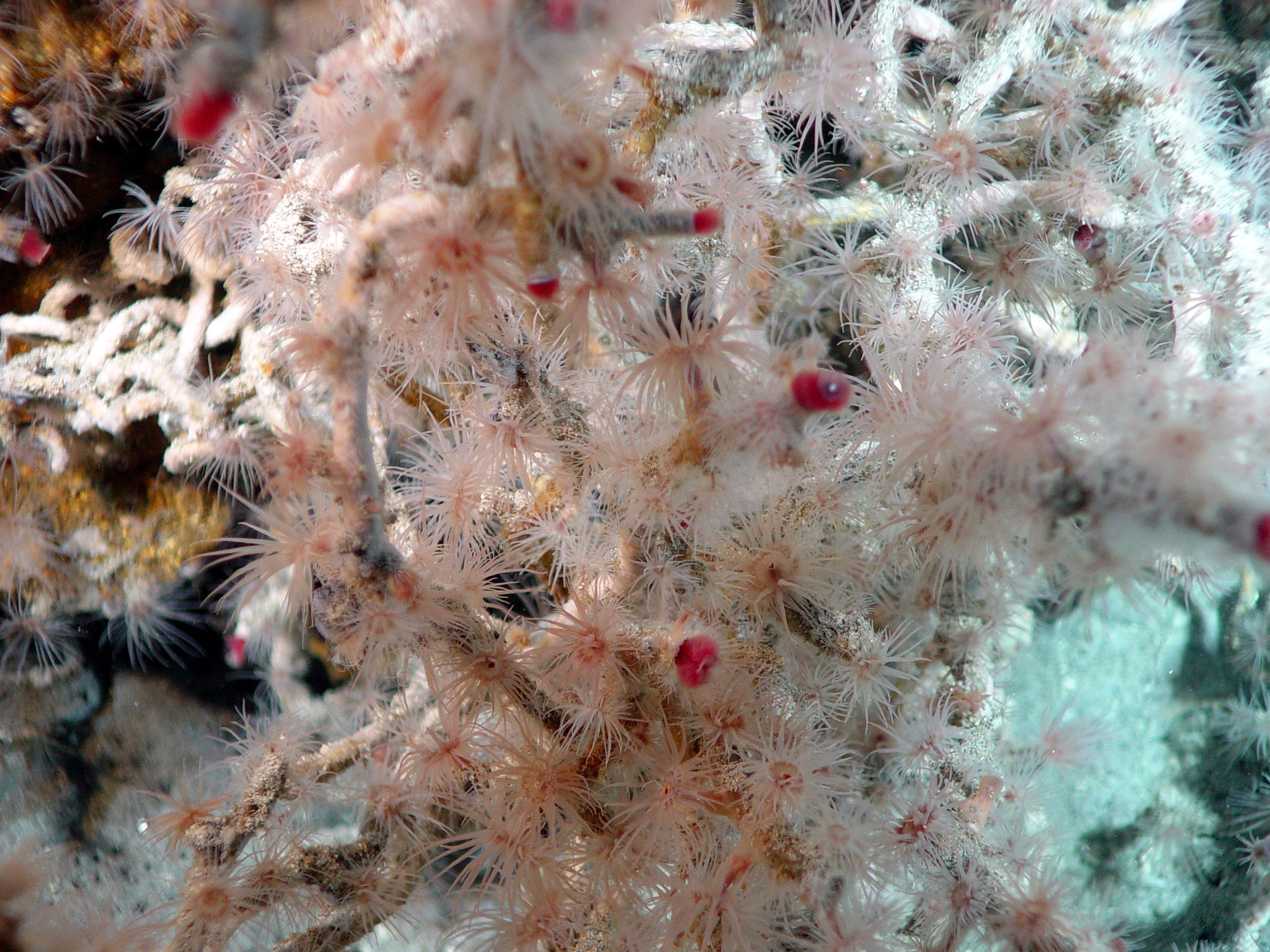
Lamellibrachia tubeworms found in Daikoku

The volcano has many hydrothermal vents, that can host various animal species including the tonguefish Symphurus thermophilus.

On Daikoku, this species lives at depths of 475–320 m (1,558–1,050 ft), which coincide with the locations of hydrothermal vents. These fish are very common and aggregate especially in flat areas with loose sediments. They are bottom-dwelling flatfish, which move frequently in small steps. Large groups of tonguefish occur up to the edge of the sulfur pond, and some fish were observed to swim onto, and pause on, the congealing sulfur, apparently unharmed. Their diet consists mostly of smaller crustaceans and polychaetes.

Also common on the sediment slopes of the seamount are the gastropod Oenopota ogasawarana and hermit crabs. On the sulphur layers at the base of the slope are bythograeid crabs, but no shrimps were found on this seamount.

Tubeworms (Lamellibrachia satsuma) can be found on the slopes of Daikoku at depths of around 400 m (1,312 ft). Like the tonguefish, the tubeworms also are mostly found near hydrothermal vents.

== Activity ==
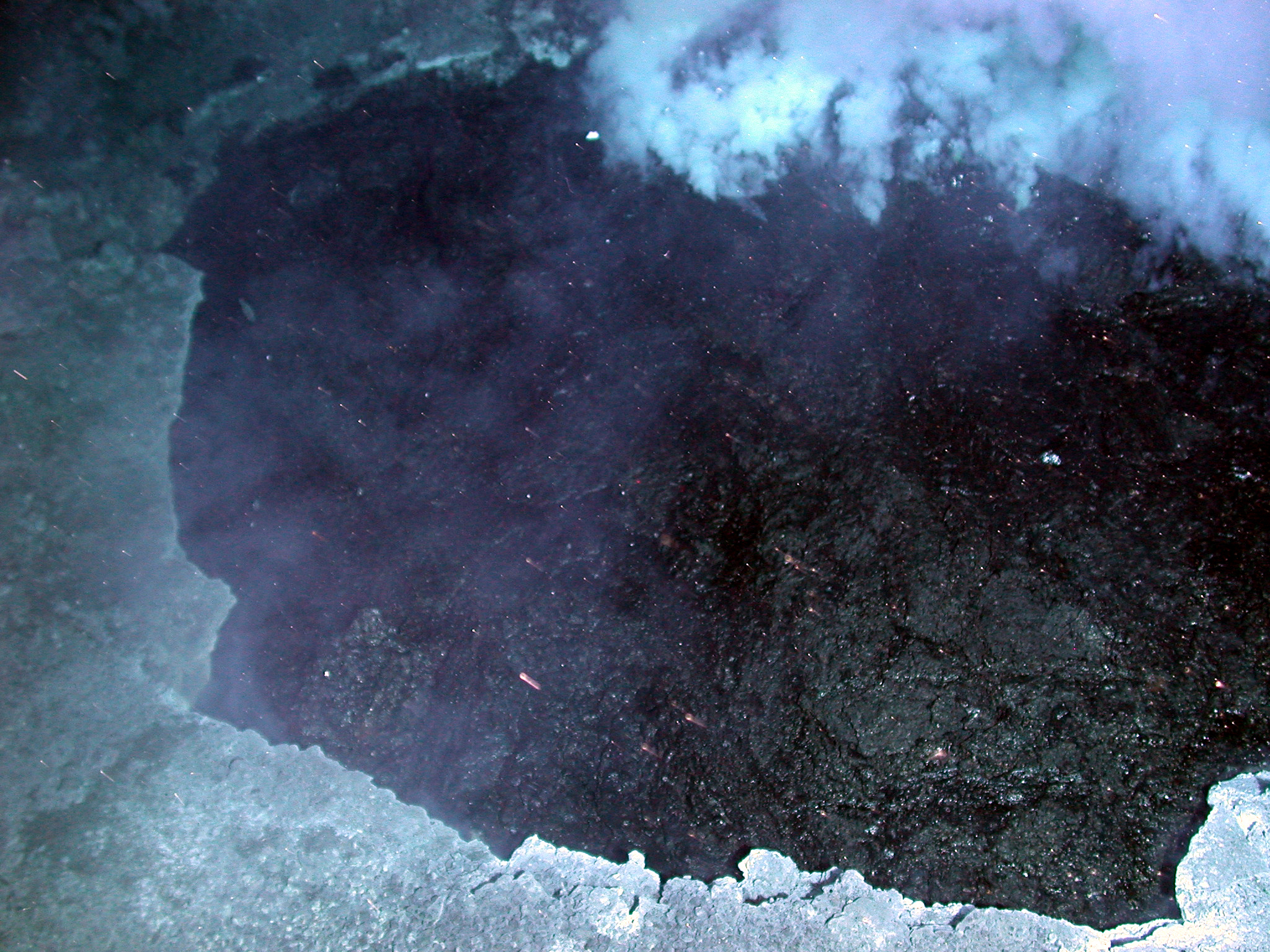
The sulfur pond

The discovery of the "Sulfur Cauldron" at the summit crater

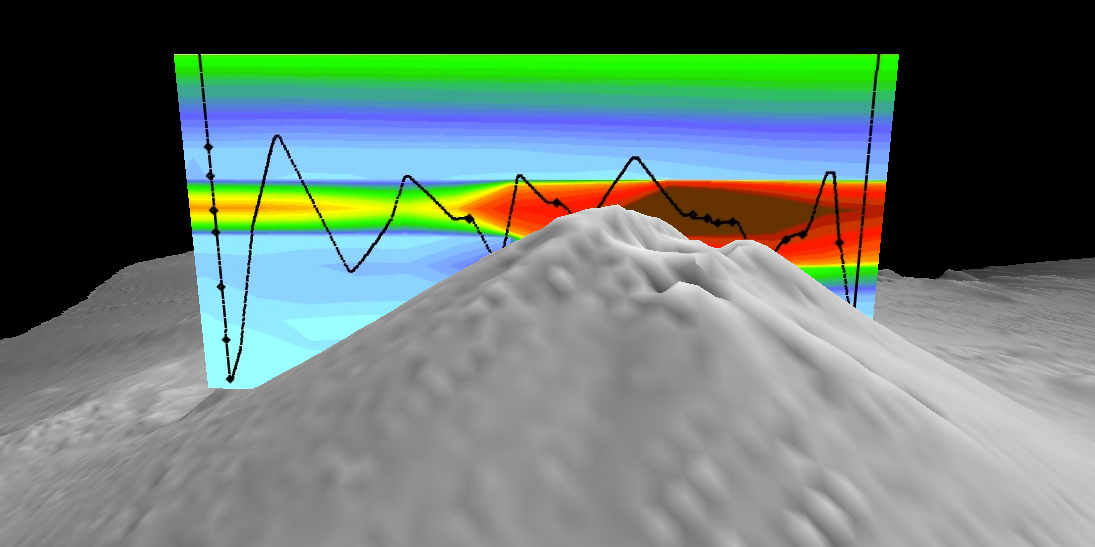
The 2014 eruption plume visualized using CTD data

The history of eruptive activity in Daikoku is not known. However, hydrothermal activity on Daikoku has been continuing for the last two decades, via the emission of high concentrations of gas with high temperatures along with the molten sulfur pond. Several expeditions have been carried out by the National Oceanic and Atmospheric Administration (NOAA) over the last few years, and activity was persistent whenever an expedition was there to observe it. In 2014, an eruption was occurring at the seamount according to high hydrogen concentrations in water samples from above the summit.

=== Expeditions ===
During an expedition conducted by the NOAA in 2006, the USNS Melville research vessel deployed the ROV Jason near Daikoku. This led to the discovery of the sulfur pond at the summit. Its temperature was measured at 187 °C (369 °F) by a thermometer deployed by the ROV. The cauldron was calculated to be 20 m × 14 m (66 ft × 46 ft) wide.

As the result of a multibeam sonar scan done and CTDs dropped into the sea by the RV Revelle in a 2014 visit, it was discovered that Daikoku had been erupting and new craters were breached onto the summit.

In June 2016, the Okeanos Explorer research vessel was involved in an expedition in the region of the Mariana Islands, and its remote operated vehicle (ROV) made a dive at the Daikoku seamount. Two days before the dive to Daikoku, the Okeanos's sonars detected a strong plume which could have been a hydrothermal bubble plume near the peak of Daikoku. During the 10-hour dive done by the ROV Deep Discoverer, the visibility was low due to the smoke from the sulfur vents. Despite that, the ROV was still able to operate. The slopes were reported to be covered with volcaniclastics and volcanic ash. Fumaroles were also found, a feature usual for active volcanoes.

In an independent 2023 cruise done to Daikoku funded by JAMSTEC, it was discovered that in contrast to the 2016 mission, the deepest part of the Sulfur Cauldron had shifted to the west by 30 m (98 ft). The dimensions of the cauldron were measured to be 50 m × 40 m (164 ft × 131 ft) wide.

== See also ==
- Nikkō Seamount
- Eifuku
- Izu-Bonin-Mariana Arc
