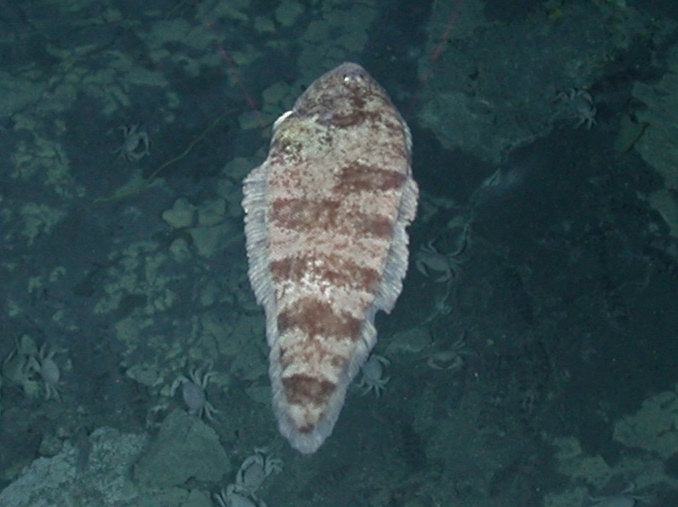

Scientific classification
- Kingdom: Animalia
- Phylum: Chordata
- Class: Actinopterygii
- Order: Carangiformes
- Suborder: Pleuronectoidei
- Family: Cynoglossidae
- Genus: Symphurus
- Species: S. thermophilus

Binomial name
- Symphurus thermophilus Munroe & Hashimoto, 2008
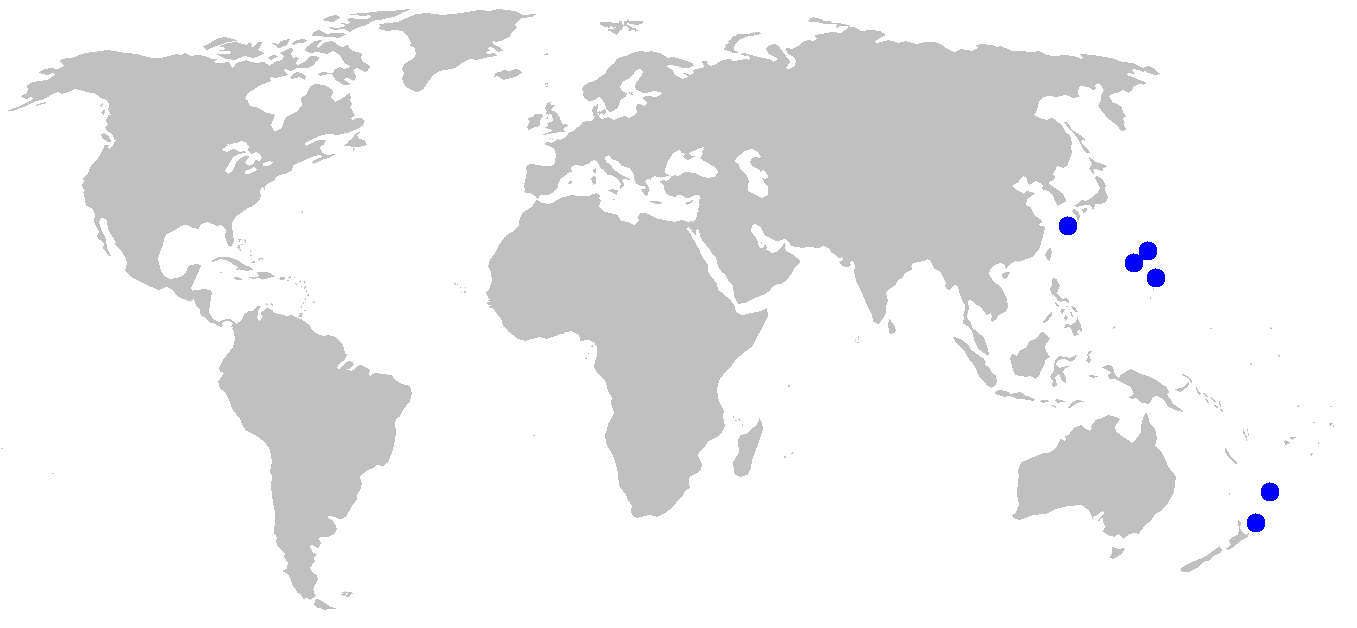
- Occurrences of Symphurus thermophilus

= Symphurus thermophilus =

Species of fish

Symphurus thermophilus is a species of tonguefish notable for being the only flatfish known to be an obligate inhabitant of hydrothermal vents. It is known to inhabit several widely dispersed locations in the western Pacific Ocean and occurs in great numbers. These flatfish are distinguished by the prominent dark crossbands on their brown eyed side, black abdominal cavity membrane lining known as the peritoneum, and white blind side. They are tolerant of harsh conditions and are often found in close association with elemental sulfur, including molten sulfur pools that exceed 180 °C in temperature. As they are not significantly different in appearance and feeding habits from other tonguefishes, they are thought to be relatively recent colonizers of vent ecosystems.

== Taxonomy ==
These fish were first observed in nature in 1988, and were provisionally assigned to the species Symphurus orientalis before being recognized as a new species. The species name thermophilus is from the Greek thermos meaning "heat" and philos meaning "lover", referring to its association with hydrothermal vents.

A cryptic species of Symphurus in the southern Tonga and Kermadec Arcs was previously described as S. thermophilus, however, research has suggested that it has a distinct genetic makeup compared to that of the S. thermophilus in the northern Mariana Arc, despite exhibiting comparable morphology and behavior.

== Distribution and habitat ==
This species has a wide, disjunct distribution in the western Pacific, from the Kaikata Seamount near the Bonin Islands off southeastern Japan, to the Rumble 3 and Macauley Submarine Volcanos on the Kermadec Ridge off northern New Zealand, including the Nikko Seamount near Minami-Iohjima Island, the Minami-Ensei Knoll in the Mid-Okinawa Trough, the Kasuga-2 and Daikoku Seamounts in the Marianas Islands arc, and the Volcano-1 and Volcano-2 Seamounts in the Tonga arc. S. thermophilus might also occur at yet-unexplored vent sites in-between these locations.Tonguefish were associated with three different substrata across the Daikoku, Kasuga-2, and Nikko seamounts. On the Daikoku and Kasuga-2 vents, the tonguefish were found on volcanoclastic and sulfuric sediments. In the Nikko vents, they were found among dense colonies of tubeworms. The fish were also associated with sheeted sulfur flows and conglomerates that were found near high temperature vents and sulfur. On outcrops of andesite and basalt that were untouched of venting, there were no tonguefish found. Of surfaces with dense microbial mats, tonguefish populations were noticeably reduced.

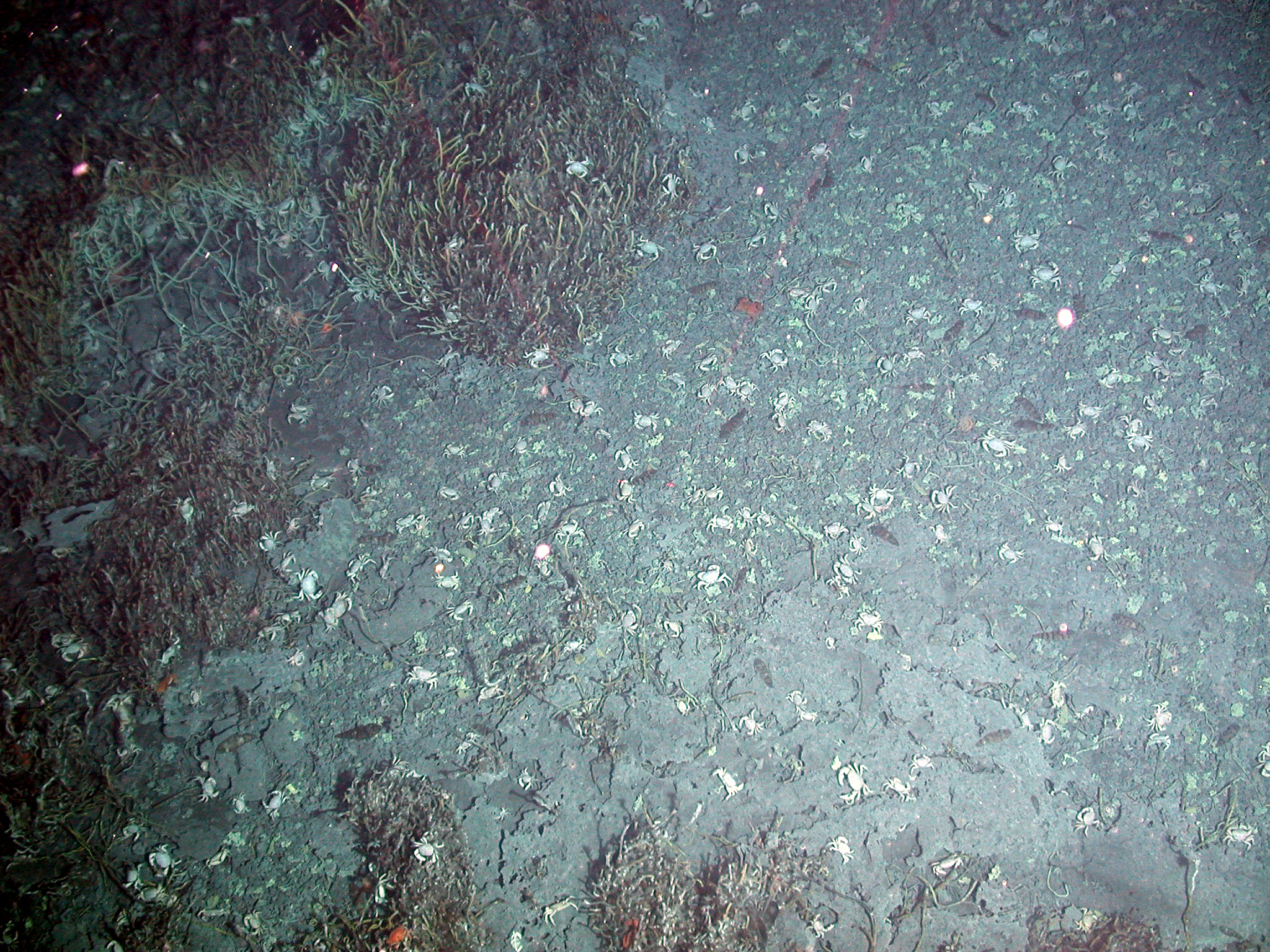
S. thermophilus and bythograeid crabs on the crust of a molten sulfur lake at the Nikko Seamount.

S. thermophilus occurs only within relatively shallow active hydrothermal vent sites at a depth of 239–733 m, with most found between 300–400 m. Both adults and juveniles are found in the same habitats. Unusually for a vent fish, S. thermophilus favors environments that are rich in sulfur; they have been observed oriented vertically on solid sulfur walls, resting on beds of newly congealed sulfur adjacent to a rivulet of molten sulfur, and even on a thin crust of consolidated sulfur pebbles overlaying a molten sulfur bed with a temperature of 187 °C (though the crust is considerably cooler).

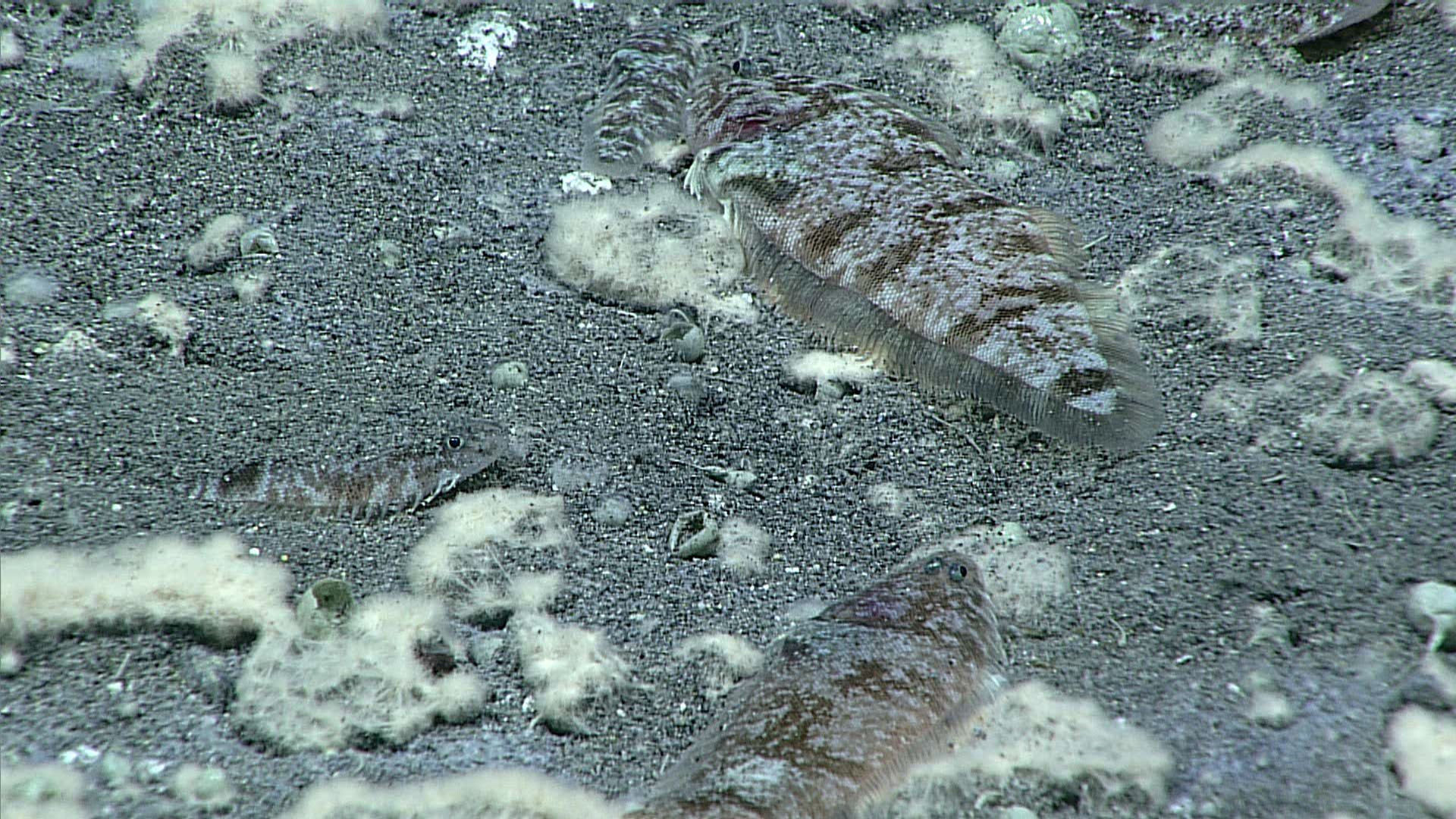
S. thermophilus surrounded by hydrothermally related bacterial mats taken during Leg 3 of the NOAA Okeanos Explorer Program's 2016 Deepwater Exploration of the Marianas.

While many flatfish species prefer a fine substrate to burrow in, S. thermophilus frequents coarse substrates and is sometimes found over solid surfaces. At the Kaikata Seamount, S. thermophilus was observed on coarse sand bottoms where water of 19-22 °C was percolating through the sediment. At the Minami-Ensei Knoll, this species was found on white metachromatic sediments in water 5-10 °C warmer than the ambient seawater. At the Kasuga-2 Seamount, it occurred on a variety of dark- and light-colored gravel sediments and on bacterial mats.

Where it occurs, S. thermophilus is often extremely abundant; it is the most numerous obligate vent vertebrate known to date. At the Kaikata Seamount, they are found in such numbers that the fish overlap one another on the bottom. Point densities at the Daikoku Seamount have been recorded as high as 392 individuals per square meter; these densities are an order of magnitude higher than flatfish densities reported anywhere else. The overall distribution of S. thermophilus are relatively dispersed. The highest abundances were found in pits of granular sulfur or volcanoclastic sediments. On the Daikoku vents, the abundance of fish was found to be 80 fish/m^{2}, which was calculated from around 150 non-overlapping images collected through remotely operated vehicles (ROVs) from 2005-2006.

== Anatomy and morphology ==
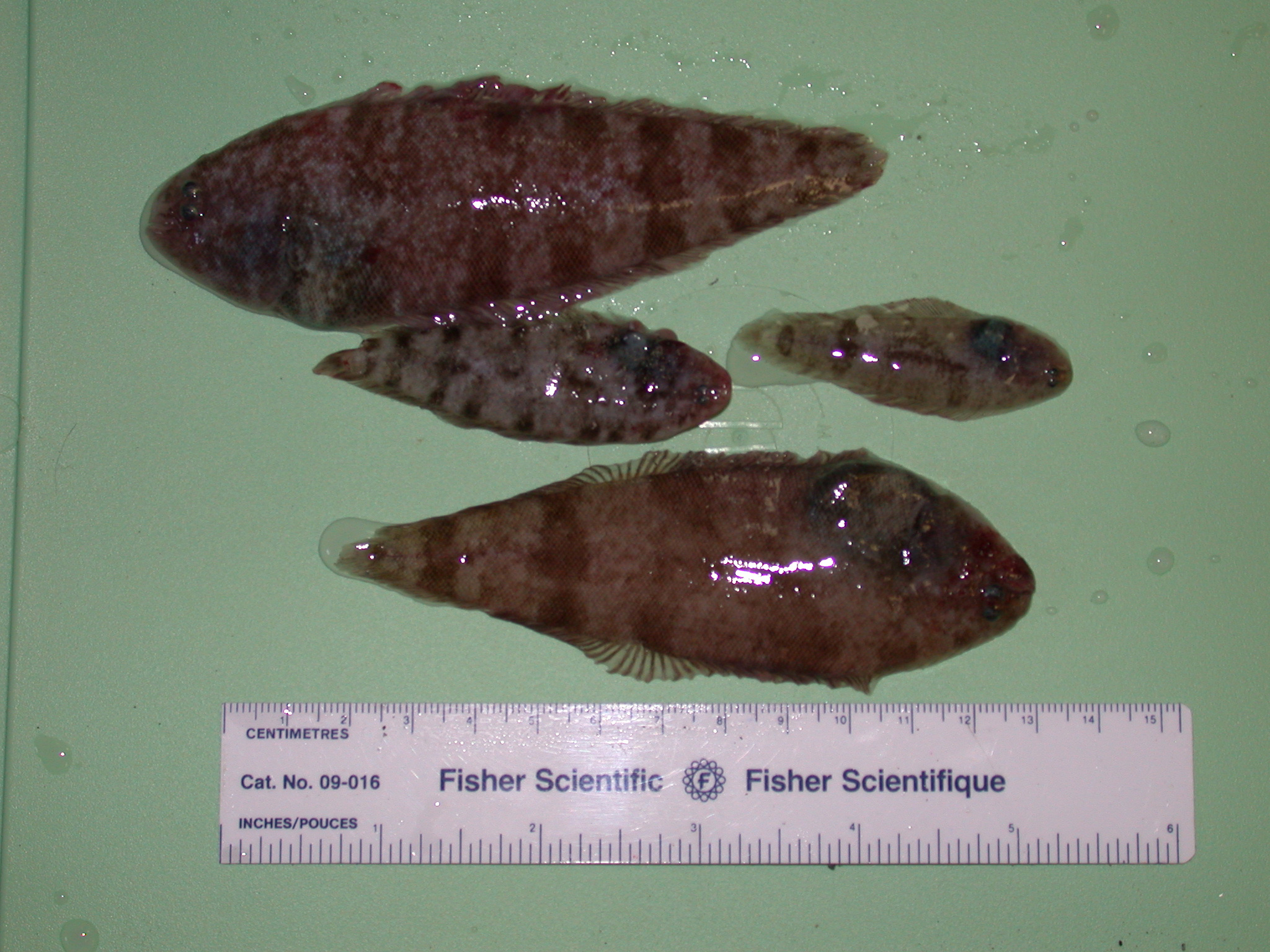
Four specimens of S. thermophilus from Nikko Seamount.

Like other tonguefishes, S. thermophilus has a laterally flattened body with united dorsal, caudal, and anal fins. Two fairly large and rounded eyes are located on the left side of the head in adults. The pectoral fins and lateral line are absent, and there is only a single, right-side pelvic fin. The head is moderately long, with a blunt snout and long, broadly arched jaws. There are 4-5 rows of teeth on the upper and lower jaws of the blind side, and 2-3 and 1 rows on upper and lower jaws respectively of the eyed side. The teeth are sharp and recurved, and better developed on the blind-side jaws.

The body is notably deep compared to other Symphurus species. The origin of the dorsal fin is located above the eyes and contains 88-94 rays. The dorsal fin pterygiophores and neural spines have a 1-2-2-2-2 interdigitation pattern. The pelvic fin is moderately long, contains 4 rays, and is connected to the body by a delicate membrane. The anal fin contains 74-80 fin rays. The caudal fin is relatively long and contains 14 rays. The scales are small and strongly ctenoid in shape, numbering 47-56 rows transversely and 100-112 rows longitudinally.

Both adults and juveniles typically exhibit similar body coloration. The eyed side of the body is medium to dark chocolate brown in color, mottled with numerous dark, irregularly shaped blotches and white speckles, along with five to eight darker, complete or incomplete crossbands. Some individuals have a white patch over two-thirds of the abdominal cavity, sometimes with bluish-green tints and bordered posteriorly by a black blotch. The abdominal area posterior to the gill opening is blackish brown and much darker than the rest of the body. A conspicuous black membrane lining of the abdominal cavity, known as the peritoneum, is visible through its abdominal wall. Occasionally there are one or two irregular to nearly circular white spots along the body midline. The fin rays are dark at the base and lighter towards the tips, and there is an irregular dark spot at the base of the caudal fin. The blind side of the body is white, with scattered dark melanophores.

The maximum known length is 8.7 cm for a male and 11.2 cm for a female. The fish from the Nikko Seamount are nearly twice as large as those from the Kasuga-2 and Daikoku Seamounts. This may be because of the higher biological productivity at Nikko, or because Kasuga-2 and Daikoku were recently colonized.

== Biology and ecology ==
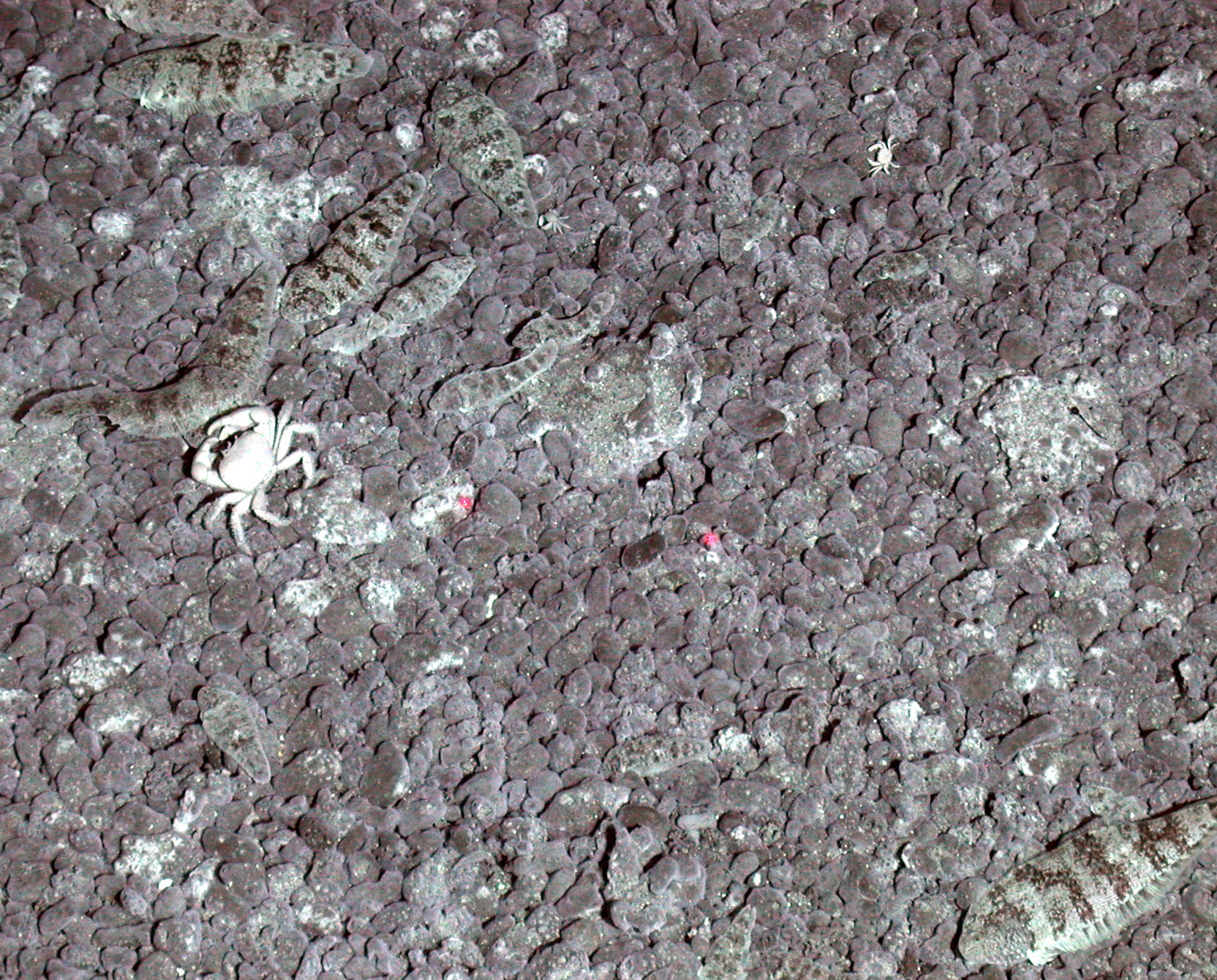
S. thermophilus with bythograeid crabs around a "sulfur cauldron" at the Daikoku Seamount.

S. thermophilus spend most of their time on the sea floor, moving forwards or backwards by undulating their bodies and sometimes burying themselves completely in the substrate. They seem to be attracted to loose sediments, probably related to the uncovering of food, and often congregate in pits. The fish frequently rest atop one another without reaction.

The vent communities that co-occur with S. thermophilus differs greatly between seamounts. They co-occur with large numbers of the snail Oenopota ogasawaarna at the Daikoku Seamount, and with the abundant shrimp Opaepele loihi at the Nikko Seamount. They also frequently occur with the crab Austinograea yunohana, which are found at Nikko, Daikoku, and Kasuga-2. Large bythograeid crabs have been observed attempting attacks on the fish, though not successfully. S. thermophilus likely experiences little to no predation pressure, which coupled with the high food biomass available allows their high densities.

The affinity of this species for native sulfur has yet to be explained. The morphology of S. thermophilus does not show any differences from other deepwater Symphurus species that would suggest adaptations to its unique habitat. However, S. thermophilus likely possesses extensive physiological and biochemical adaptations for coping with the harsh conditions around hydrothermal vents, such as temperature and pH fluctuations, and exposure to heavy metals. In particular, they must have high hemoglobin oxygen affinities and efficient respiratory systems to deal with the toxic hydrogen sulfide in venting fluid. S. thermophilus is also capable of tolerating pH as low as 2, akin to sulfuric acid, and can rest over pools of molten sulfur without harm. Individuals of S. thermophilus often show skeletal abnormalities such as undeveloped fin rays or fused bones, likely attributable to the vent environment.

=== Feeding habits and diet ===
S. thermophilus are particularly active in their search for infaunal prey on sediments. To create space in their stomachs for additional food intake, they expel any ingested sediment either via their gills or gut upon spotting their prey.

Based on the fatty acid composition and stable carbon isotope ratios in tissues of S. thermophilus found on the Mariana Arc, there is evidence that the fish ingest material that originated in the photic zone. At Daikoku seamounts, fatty acid composition of S. thermophilus suggest that food webs were more based on chemosynthesis than at other seamounts in the Mariana Arc.

The diet of S. thermophilus varies significantly from seamount to seamount, with the only constant being polychaete worms, which are most important for individuals on Daikoku and Volcano-1 Seamounts. Other populations feed predominantly on crustaceans; the main prey item of S. thermophilus on the Nikko Seamount is the alvinocaridid shrimp Opaepele loihi, and on the Kasuga-2 Seamount they eat mostly palaemonid shrimp. The fish at these sites appear to be "sit and wait" predators, preying on slow-moving shrimp that wander too close. By contrast, the fish at the Daikoku Seamount seem to be more active, opportunistic foragers; they do not eat many crustaceans and have been observed scavenging on dying fish that fall to the bottom after coming into contact with the volcanic plumes. Snails and sponge spicules have also been found in the stomachs of a few individuals, and in captivity they are known to consume any food offered to them. The large numbers of S. thermophilus found on sulfur crusts where there are no obvious prey items may feed directly on filaments of chemosynthetic bacteria. If so, this would represent a hitherto unknown behavior for vent fish species.

=== Reproduction and development ===
Reproduction is oviparous, with females releasing buoyant eggs measuring 0.9 mm in diameter. The developmental speed of the eggs decreases with temperature: they hatch in one day at 26 °C, in 3 days at 20 °C, and in 14 days at 12 °C. The newly hatched fry are initially sustained by a yolk sac, and have a completely developed mouth, eyes, and digestive system by 7 days of age. The migration of the eyes begins after 30 days.

Compared to other flatfish, S. thermophilus is slow-growing and long-lived, with a lifespan upwards of 10 years. Growth differs between populations, due to availability of food and consequent activity level. Over half their growth in length is accomplished in the first three years, with the growth rate slowing down afterwards. Both sexes likely attain sexual maturity at around 4.4 cm long and one year of age.
