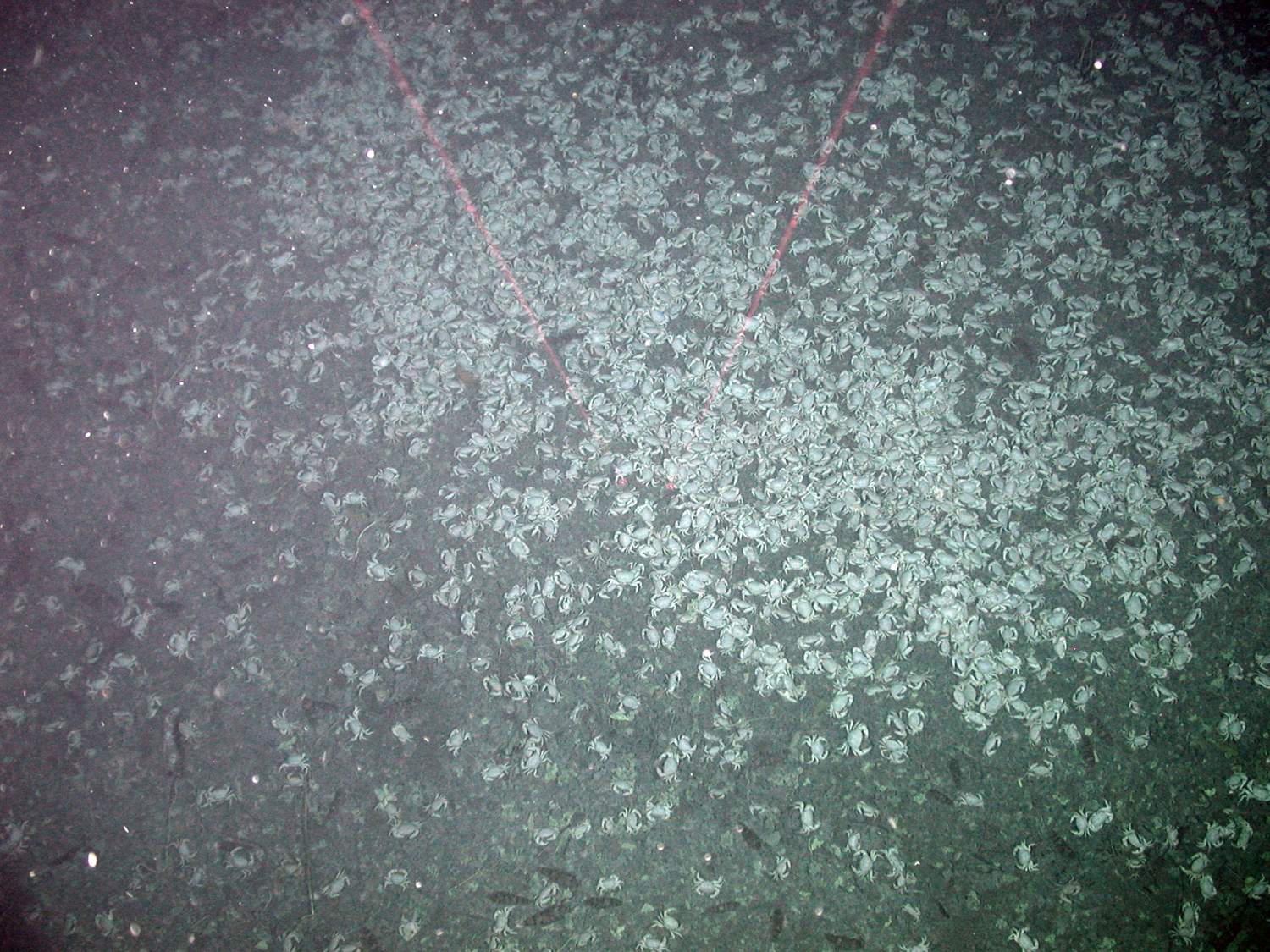
- A consortium of crabs in an area of hydrothermal activity

Scientific classification
- Kingdom: Animalia
- Phylum: Arthropoda
- Class: Malacostraca
- Order: Decapoda
- Suborder: Pleocyemata
- Infraorder: Brachyura
- Family: Bythograeidae
- Genus: Cyanagraea de Saint Laurent, 1984
- Species: C. praedator

Binomial name
- Cyanagraea praedator de Saint Laurent, 1984

= Cyanagraea =

Genus of crabs

Cyanagraea praedator is a species of crab that lives on hydrothermal vents, and the only species in the genus Cyanagraea.

It is found at depths of 2,535–2,630 m (8,317–8,629 ft) on the East Pacific Rise, where it lives "in the upper part of black smoker chimneys". Its haemocyanin has a strong affinity for oxygen, and displays a significant Bohr effect, which is unaffected by lactic acid.

Cyanagraea praedator is "by far the largest" species in the family Bythograeidae, growing to a maximum carapace size of 123.0 mm × 74.8 mm (4.84 in × 2.94 in).

The leech Bathybdella sawyeri has been observed attached to C. praedator.
