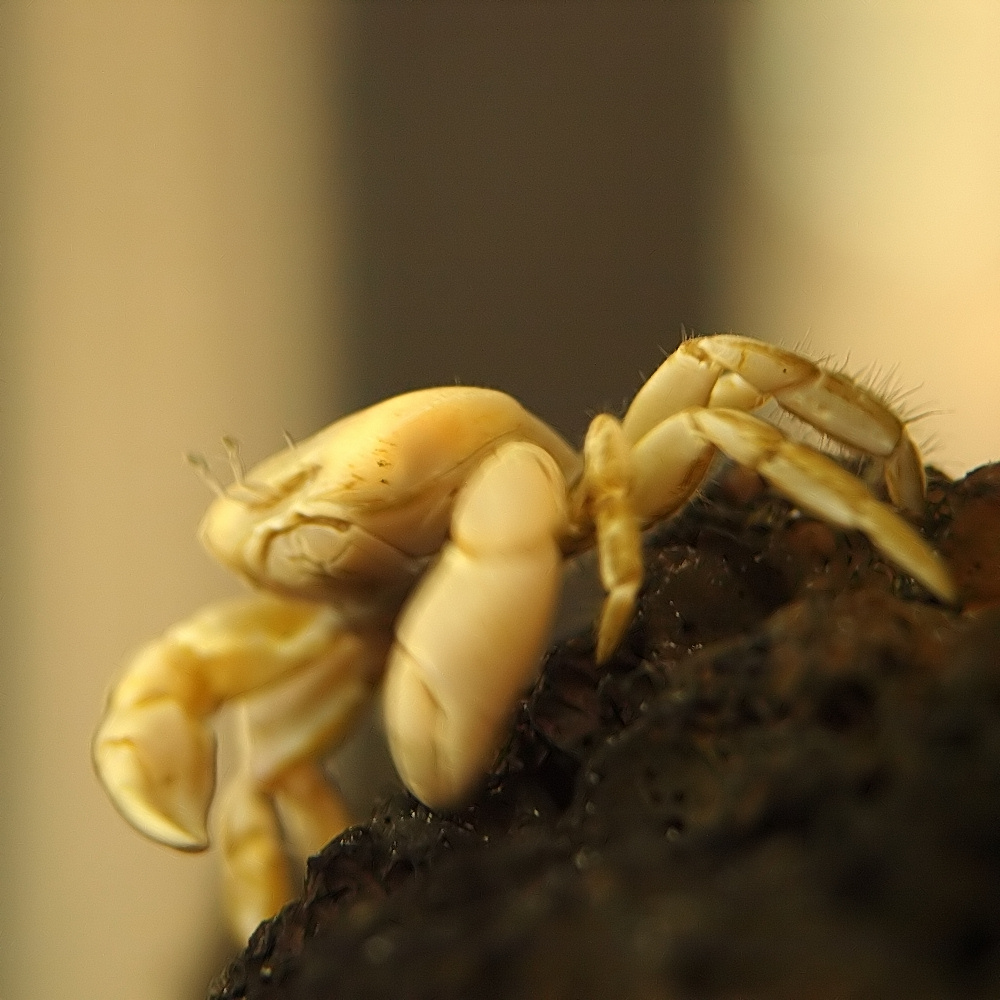

Scientific classification
- Kingdom: Animalia
- Phylum: Arthropoda
- Class: Malacostraca
- Order: Decapoda
- Suborder: Pleocyemata
- Infraorder: Brachyura
- Family: Bythograeidae
- Genus: Gandalfus
- Species: G. yunohana

Binomial name
- Gandalfus yunohana (Takeda, Hashimoto & Ohta, 2000)

Synonyms
- Austinograea yunohana Takeda, Hashimoto & Ohta, 2000

= Gandalfus yunohana =

Species of crab

Gandalfus yunohana is a species of blind crab in the family Bythograeidae found on hydrothermal vents on the eastern edge of the Philippine Sea Plate south of Japan. Because no light penetrates to such depths, the eyes of G. yunohana are immobile and unpigmented.

== Description ==
Males have a carapace up to 41.9 mm × 26.9 mm (1.6 in × 1.1 in) across, while females are larger, at 50.5 mm × 32.5 mm (2.0 in × 1.3 in). The eyes are immobile and unpigmented.

== Taxonomy and etymology ==
The species was originally described as Austinograea yunohana in 2000. It was transferred in 2007 by New Zealand marine biologist and carcinologist Colin McLay to his new genus, Gandalfus, named after the character Gandalf from The Lord of the Rings.

== Distribution ==
Gandalfus zunohana is found on hydrothermal vents on the eastern edge of the Philippine Sea Plate south of Japan. It lives at shallower depths than other members of the family Bythograeidae, at 420–1,380 m (1,380–4,530 ft).
