= Euryxanthops flexidentatus =

Scientific classification
- Domain: Eukaryota
- Kingdom: Animalia
- Phylum: Arthropoda
- Class: Malacostraca
- Order: Decapoda
- Suborder: Pleocyemata
- Infraorder: Brachyura
- Family: Xanthidae
- Genus: Euryxanthops
- Species: E. flexidentatus

Binomial name
- Euryxanthops flexidentatus Garth & Kim, 1983

Species of crab

Euryxanthops flexidentatus is a species of crab.
