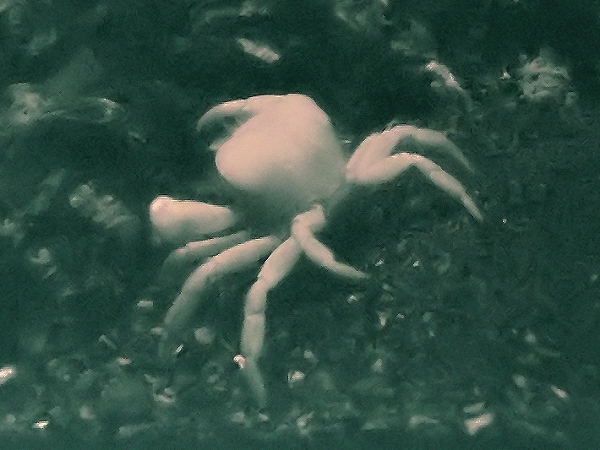
- Gandalfus yunohana

Scientific classification
- Domain: Eukaryota
- Kingdom: Animalia
- Phylum: Arthropoda
- Class: Malacostraca
- Order: Decapoda
- Suborder: Pleocyemata
- Infraorder: Brachyura
- Family: Bythograeidae
- Genus: Gandalfus; McLay, 2007

= Gandalfus =

Genus of crabs

Gandalfus is a genus of crabs belonging to the family Bythograeidae. Gandalfus species occur around hydrothermal vents.

The species of this genus are found in the western Pacific Ocean.

Species:

- Gandalfus puia McLay, 2007
- Gandalfus yunohana (Takeda, Hashimoto & Ohta, 2000)
