= Euryxanthops chiltoni =

Scientific classification
- Domain: Eukaryota
- Kingdom: Animalia
- Phylum: Arthropoda
- Class: Malacostraca
- Order: Decapoda
- Suborder: Pleocyemata
- Infraorder: Brachyura
- Family: Xanthidae
- Genus: Euryxanthops
- Species: E. chiltoni

Binomial name
- Euryxanthops chiltoni Ng & McLay, 2007

Species of crab

Euryxanthops chiltoni is a species of crab found in the New Zealand Exclusive Economic Zone. It was first described by Colin McLay and Peter Ng in a 2007 paper, along with Medaeops serenei.
