= Euryxanthops orientalis =

Scientific classification
- Domain: Eukaryota
- Kingdom: Animalia
- Phylum: Arthropoda
- Class: Malacostraca
- Order: Decapoda
- Suborder: Pleocyemata
- Infraorder: Brachyura
- Family: Xanthidae
- Genus: Euryxanthops
- Species: E. orientalis

Binomial name
- Euryxanthops orientalis (Sakai, 1939)

Species of crab

Euryxanthops orientalis is a species of crab found in Sagami Bay, Japan.
