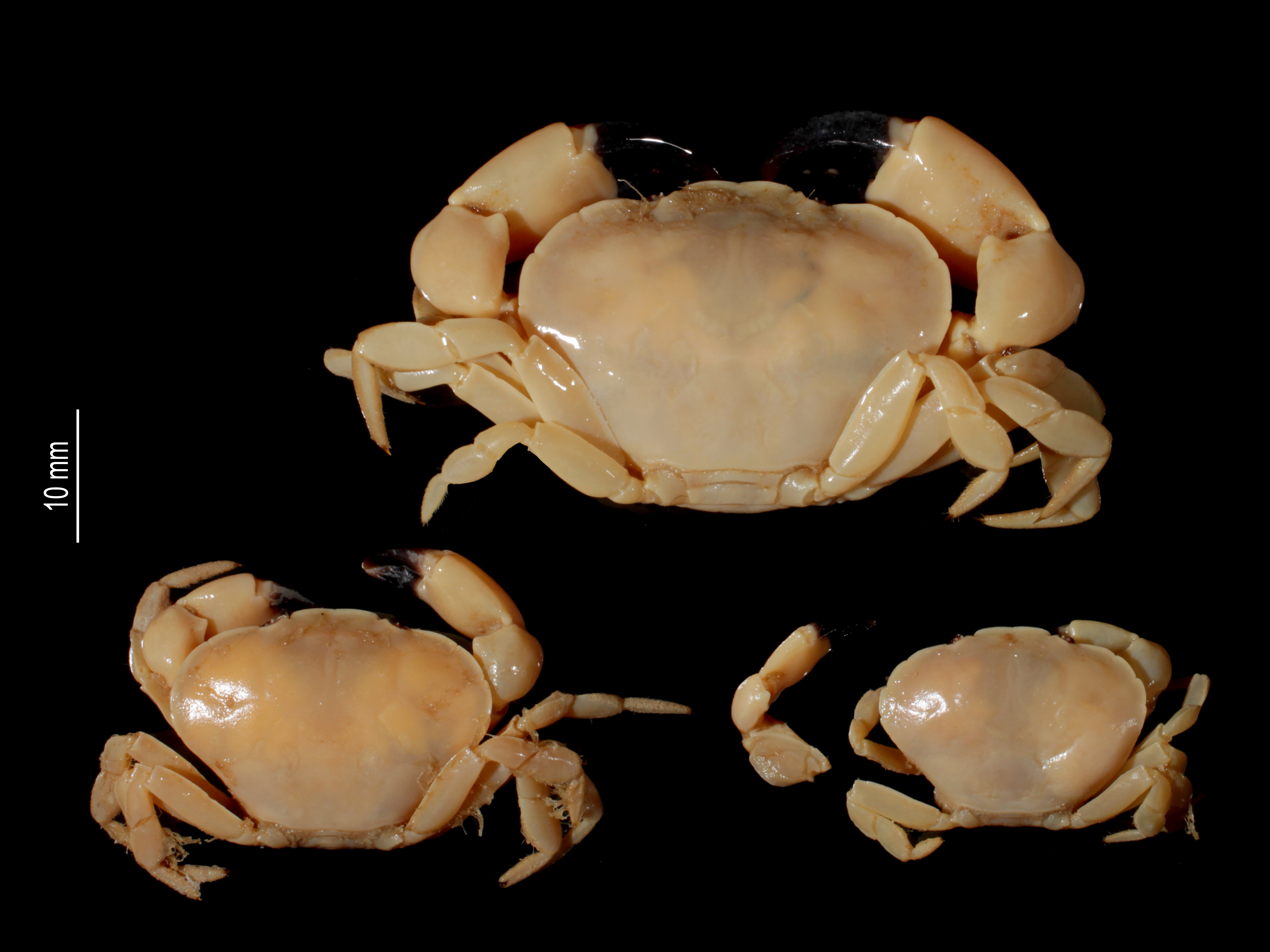
- Euryxanthops cepros

Scientific classification
- Domain: Eukaryota
- Kingdom: Animalia
- Phylum: Arthropoda
- Class: Malacostraca
- Order: Decapoda
- Suborder: Pleocyemata
- Infraorder: Brachyura
- Family: Xanthidae
- Subfamily: Xanthinae
- Genus: Euryxanthops; Garth & Kim, 1983

= Euryxanthops =

Genus of crabs

Euryxanthops is a genus of crabs in the family Xanthidae. It was originally established in 1983 by Garth & Kim to contain three species of deep-water crabs from Japan and the Philippines - Euryxanthops dorsiconvexus, Euryxanthops flexidentatus and Euryxanthops orientalis. Since then, several more species of this genus have been identified and described, and Euryxanthops currently contains:

- Euryxanthops cepros Davie, 1997
- Euryxanthops chiltoni Ng & McLay, 2007
- Euryxanthops dorsiconvexus Garth & Kim, 1983
- Euryxanthops flexidentatus Garth & Kim, 1983
- Euryxanthops latifrons Davie, 1997
- Euryxanthops orientalis (Sakai, 1939)
