= Nikkō Seamount =

Submarine volcano within the Volcano Islands, Japan

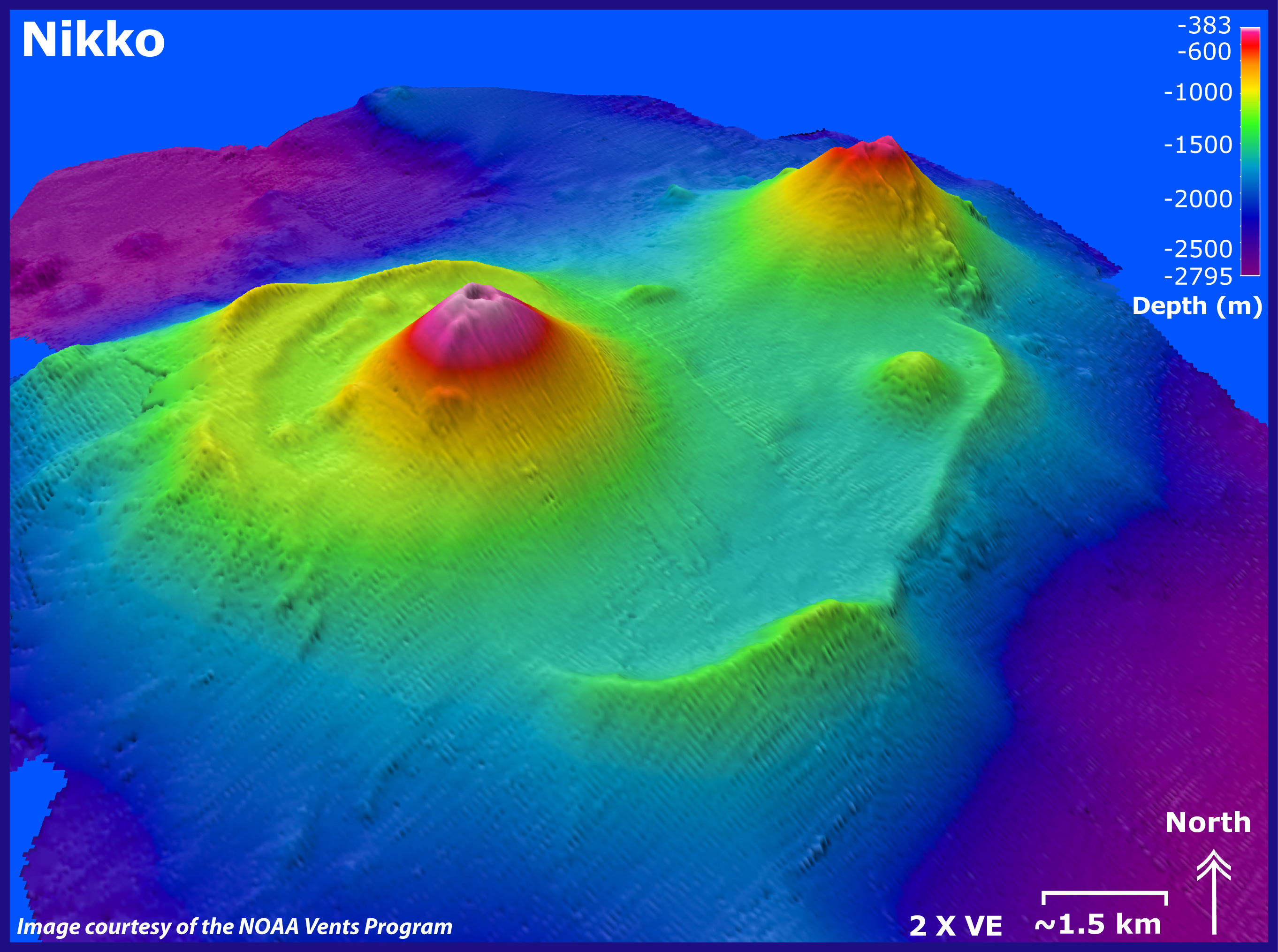
- Bathymetry map of Nikko
- Summit depth: −392 m (−1,286 ft)
- Height: ~2,900 m (9,514 ft)

Location
- Range: Izu-Ogasawara Ridge
- Coordinates: 23°04′40″N 142°19′33″E
- Country: Japan

Geology
- Type: Caldera
- Last activity: 1979

Nikkō Seamount (Japanese: 日光海山) is a submarine volcano in the Volcano Islands region of Japan. It is the southernmost volcano of Japan.

== Geography ==
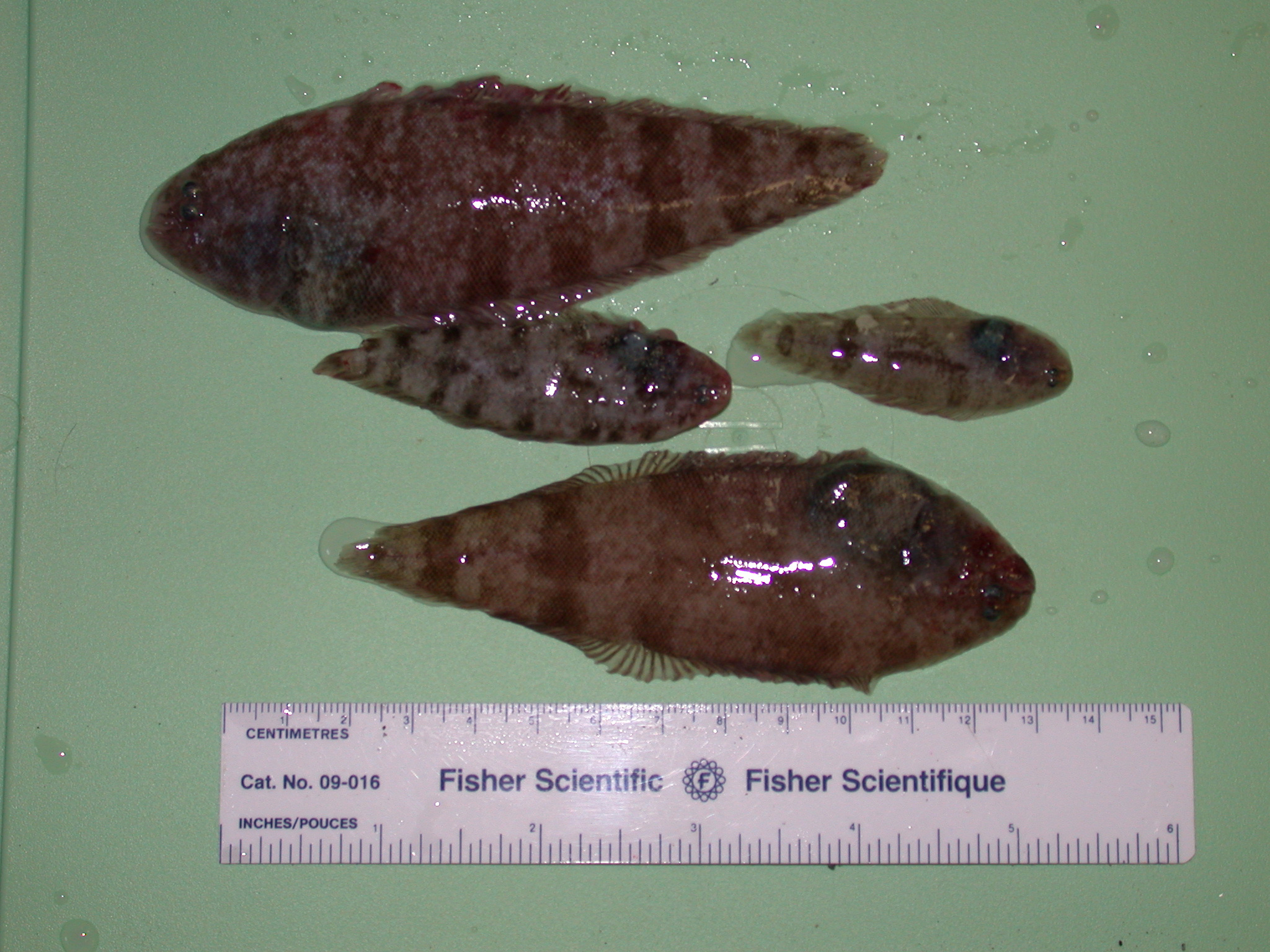
Tonguefish samples from Nikkō Seamount

The Nikkō caldera is a volcanic complex consisting of a caldera and 2 other cones that are the active parts of the volcano which last had an activity in 1979. It is 155 km (96 mi) south-southeast of Iwo Jima and 945 km (587 mi) north-northwest of Saipan.

== Marine life ==
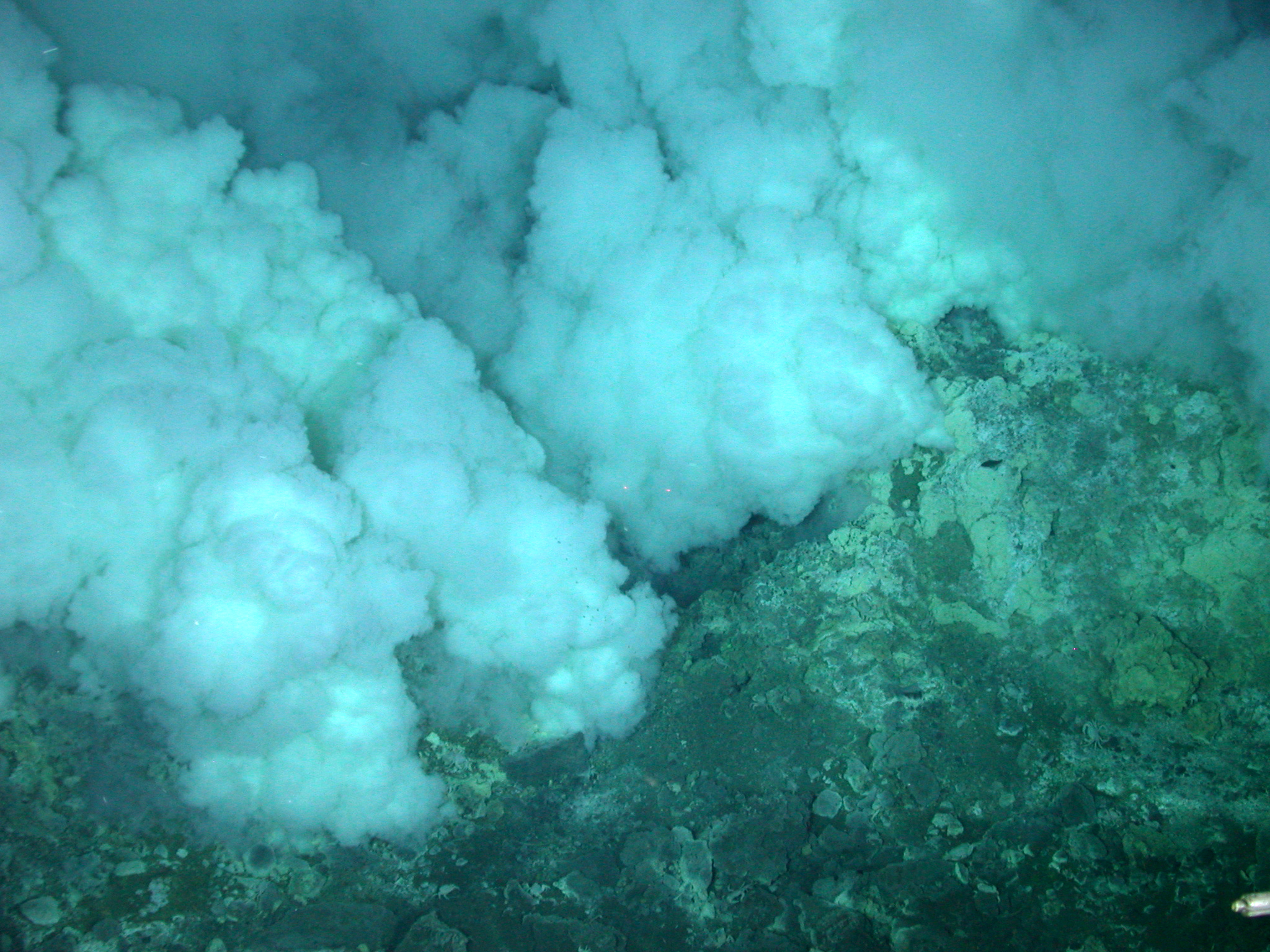
Smoke chimneys in the Nikkō Caldera floor

Nikkō is home to many underwater species, specifically 14 species which come from 12 families including the Symphurus thermophilus, which are species that live in hydrothermal vent environments, which Nikkō has hydrothermal vents considering it is an active volcano. The seamount does also have endemic crustaceans, including the Paragiopagurus ventilatus.

== Activity ==
The volcano isn't the most active volcano, however the last activity recorded was in 1979. On July 12, 1979, a pale-green and wide patch of discolored water was observed over Nikkō Seamount.

=== 2006 expedition ===
In 2006, the NOAA Ocean Explorer program launched an expedition called 'The Submarine Ring of Fire 2006 Expedition'. This expedition started on April 18, 2006 and ended on May 13, 2006. During the expedition, on 12 May 2006, the research vessel arrived near the Nikkō area. The remotely operated underwater vehicle Jason II was deployed. With the vehicle, the caldera floor of Nikkō was observed. Large sulfur deposits were found and hydrothermal vents were seen.

== See also ==
- Minami-Hiyoshi Seamount
- List of volcanoes in Japan
