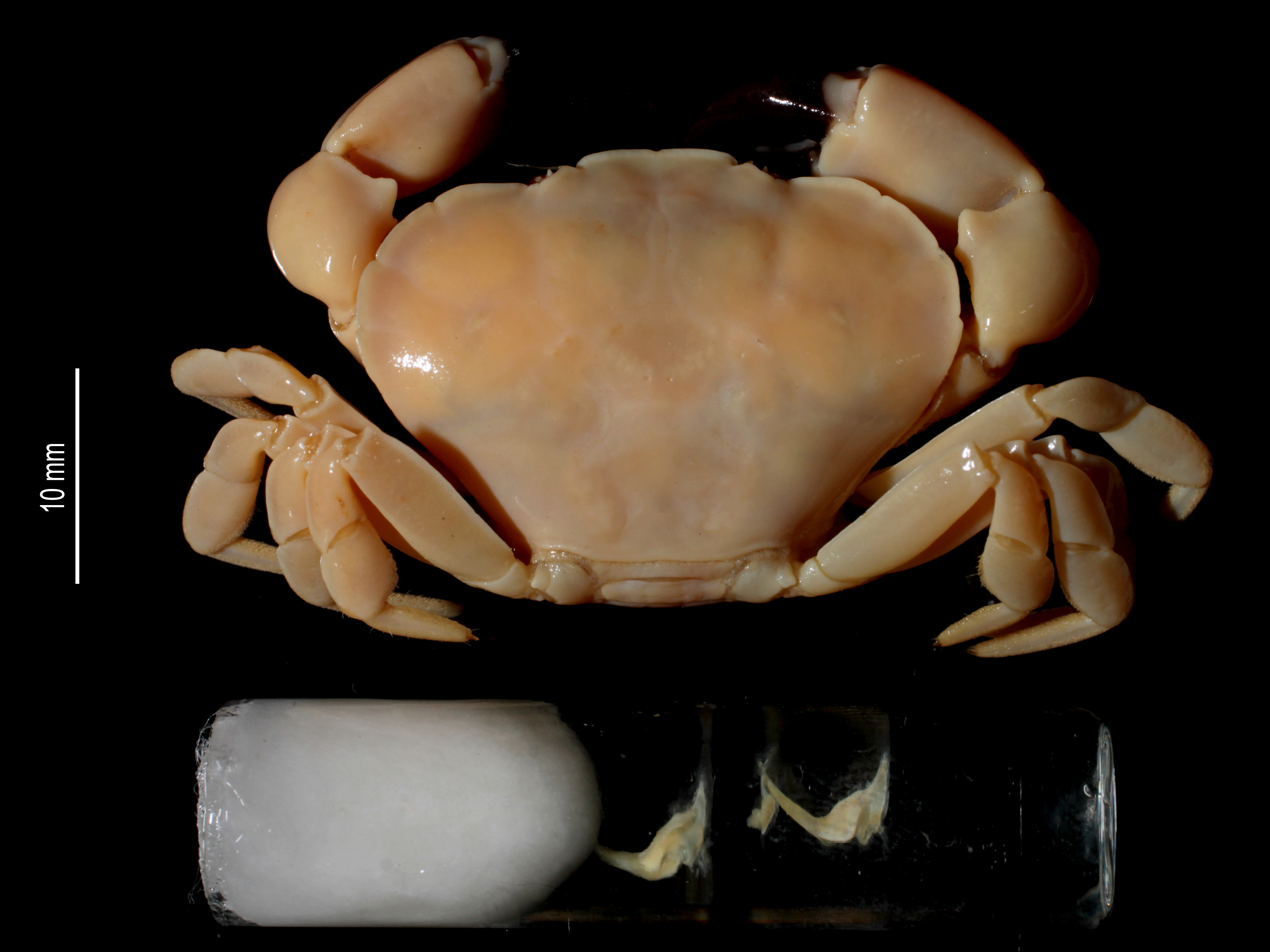
- Preserved specimen of Euryxanthops cepros

Scientific classification
- Kingdom: Animalia
- Phylum: Arthropoda
- Clade: Pancrustacea
- Class: Malacostraca
- Order: Decapoda
- Suborder: Pleocyemata
- Infraorder: Brachyura
- Family: Xanthidae
- Genus: Euryxanthops
- Species: E. cepros

Binomial name
- Euryxanthops cepros Davie, 1997

= Euryxanthops cepros =

Species of crab

Euryxanthops cepros is a species of crab in the family Xanthidae. It was described by Peter Davie in 1997 from specimens collected in the Seychelles in the Indian Ocean.

The species was collected at depths of about 250–300 metres during the CEPROS expedition. The holotype and paratypes are held in the crustacean collections of the Muséum national d'Histoire naturelle in Paris.
