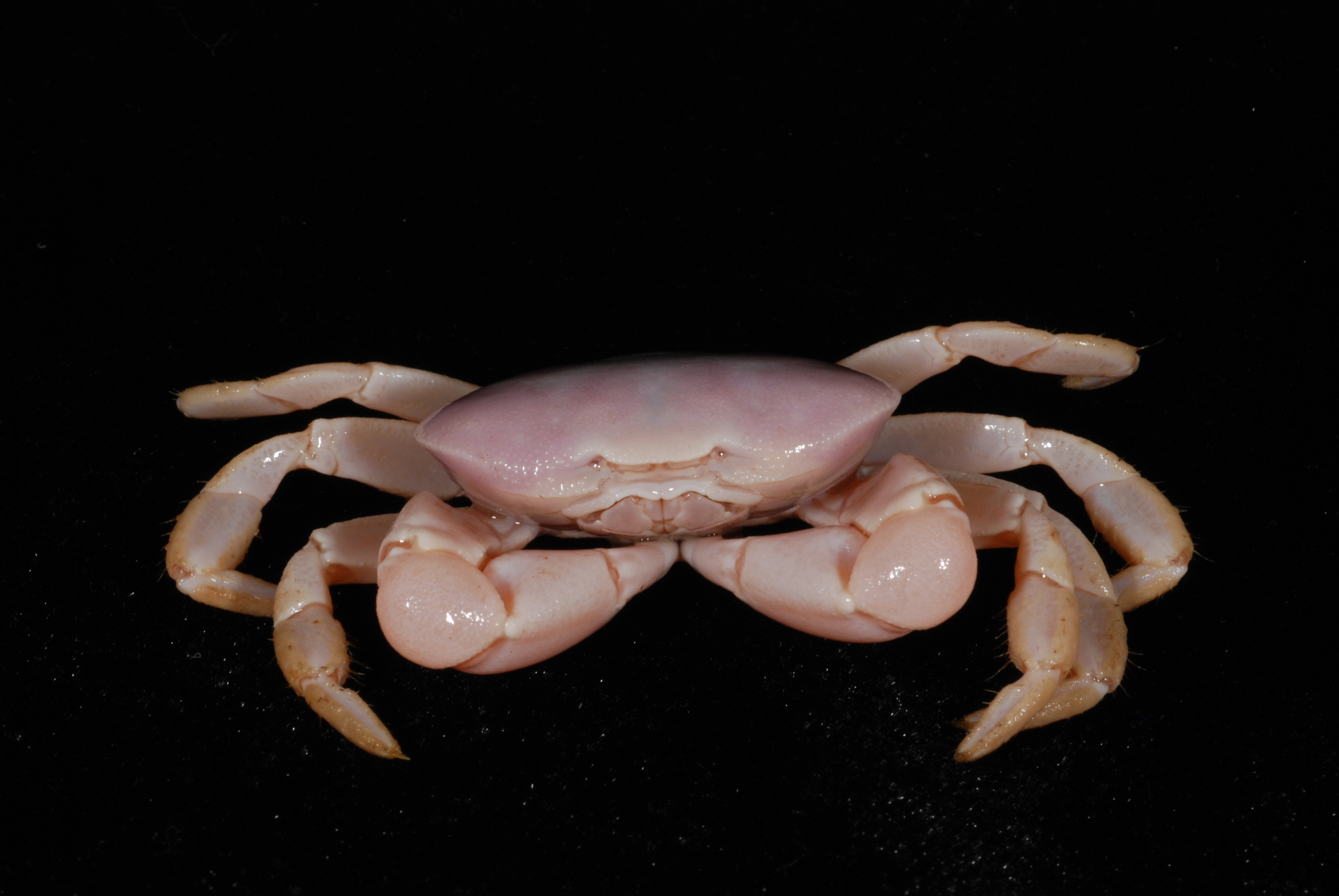
- A New Zealand blind vent crab, Gandalfus puia

Conservation status
- Naturally Uncommon (NZ TCS)

Scientific classification
- Kingdom: Animalia
- Phylum: Arthropoda
- Clade: Pancrustacea
- Class: Malacostraca
- Order: Decapoda
- Suborder: Pleocyemata
- Infraorder: Brachyura
- Family: Bythograeidae
- Genus: Gandalfus
- Species: G. puia

Binomial name
- Gandalfus puia McLay, 2007

= Gandalfus puia =

Species of crab

Gandalfus puia is the only known New Zealand species of crab in the family Bythograeidae, commonly known as the blind vent crabs. Like other blind vent crabs, it only lives in hydrothermal vent waters. This species was first described in 2007 after specimens were collected from the undersea volcanic ridge near the Kermadec Islands.

== Description ==
The current description for Gandalfus puia is based on six specimens collected in 2005.

This crab is characterised by a flat, elliptical carapace that is wider than it is long. Both males and females have dimorphic chelipeds: the right cheliped is stouter than the left, suggesting that it is used for crushing while the left is used for cutting. Adults have vestigial eyes, with immovable eyestalks and unpigmented corneas. Reduced eyes are typical for the family Bythograeidae family, probably from the ancestor of this group colonising the dark deep ocean. Adults are pale yellow, darker brown along their legs and setae, but because they live next to mineral-rich hydrothermal vent waters they are often coated with rusty ferric precipitate.

== Distribution ==
Gandalfus puia was first discovered along submarine volcanoes near the Kermadec Islands, making it the southernmost bythograeid recorded. Specimens have been collected at depths from 239 to 1,647 m (784 to 5,404 ft), shallower than other bythograeid crabs.

== Etymology ==
This species was named by New Zealand marine biologist and carcinologist Colin McLay. The genus name references Gandalf, the wizard character in The Lord of the Rings, the novel written by J. R. R. Tolkien and later filmed in New Zealand. The species name comes from the Māori term for thermal spring or volcano.
