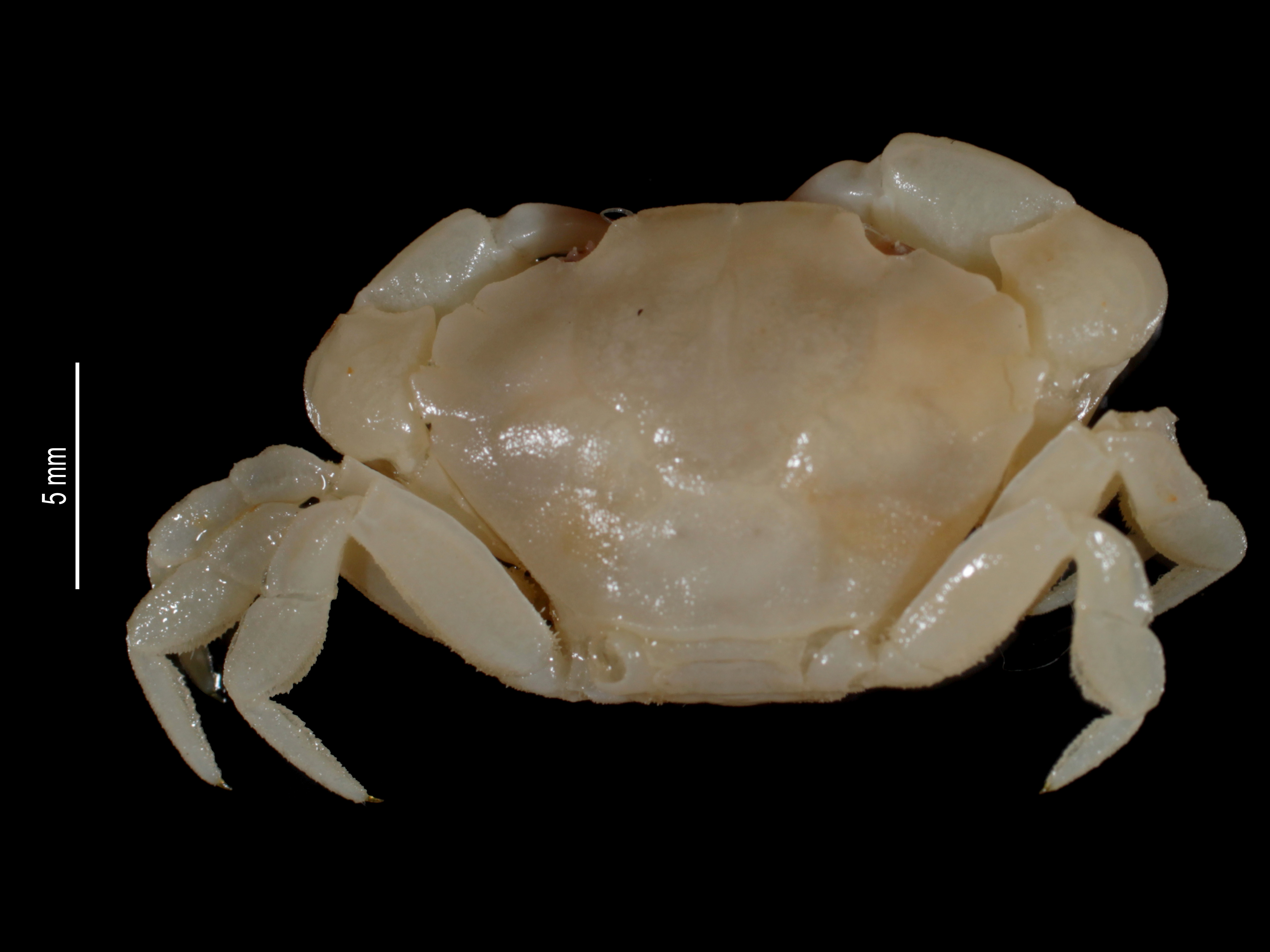
- Preserved specimen of Euryxanthops latifrons

Scientific classification
- Domain: Eukaryota
- Kingdom: Animalia
- Phylum: Arthropoda
- Class: Malacostraca
- Order: Decapoda
- Suborder: Pleocyemata
- Infraorder: Brachyura
- Family: Xanthidae
- Genus: Euryxanthops
- Species: E. latifrons

Binomial name
- Euryxanthops latifrons Davie, 1997

= Euryxanthops latifrons =

Species of crab

Euryxanthops latifrons is a species of crab found in the New Caledonian Exclusive Economic Zone.
