= Colin McLay =

New Zealand marine biologist

- Born: 1942
- Died: 3 December 2022 (aged 79–80)
- Alma mater: University of Otago; University of British Columbia
- Employer: University of Canterbury

Colin L. McLay (1942 – 3 December 2022) was a New Zealand marine biologist and carcinologist. Educated at the University of Otago and the University of British Columbia, he served as an Associate Professor of Marine Biology at the University of Canterbury. He discovered several species of crab, including Desmodromia tranterae, Euryxanthops chiltoni, Gandalfus puia, and Hirsutodynomene vespertilio.

He died on 3 December 2022.
