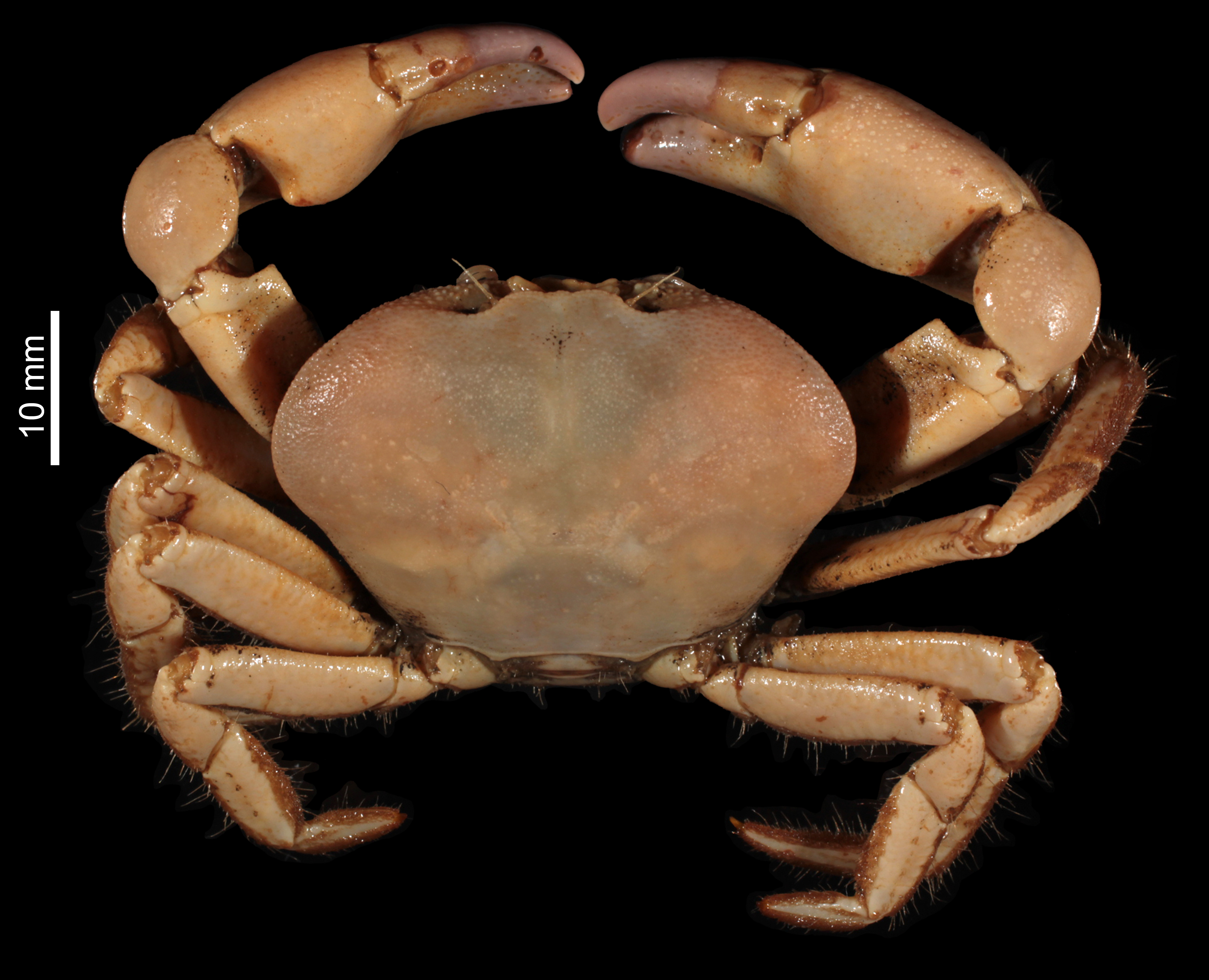
- Gandalfus yunohana

Scientific classification
- Kingdom: Animalia
- Phylum: Arthropoda
- Class: Malacostraca
- Order: Decapoda
- Suborder: Pleocyemata
- Infraorder: Brachyura
- Subsection: Heterotremata
- Superfamily: Bythograeoidea; Williams, 1980
- Family: Bythograeidae; Williams, 1980

Genera
- Allograea; Austinograea; Bythograea; Cyanagraea; Gandalfus; Segonzacia

= Bythograeidae =

Family of crabs

The Bythograeidae are a small family of blind crabs which live around hydrothermal vents. The family contains 16 species in six genera. Their relationships to other crabs are unclear. They are believed to eat bacteria and other vent organisms. Bythograeidae are a monophyletic, sister taxon of the superfamily Xanthoidea which split to inhabit hydrothermal vents around the Eocene.

== Origins ==
Due to the lack of fossils found in this group the exact date of origin of Bythograeidae remains unknown. It has been suggested that bythograeidae do not originate from an ancient hydrothermal bathyal groups but instead arose from brachyuran stock that was adapted to shallow hydrothermal vents and then transitioned to deep sea hydrothermal vents around the Eocene.

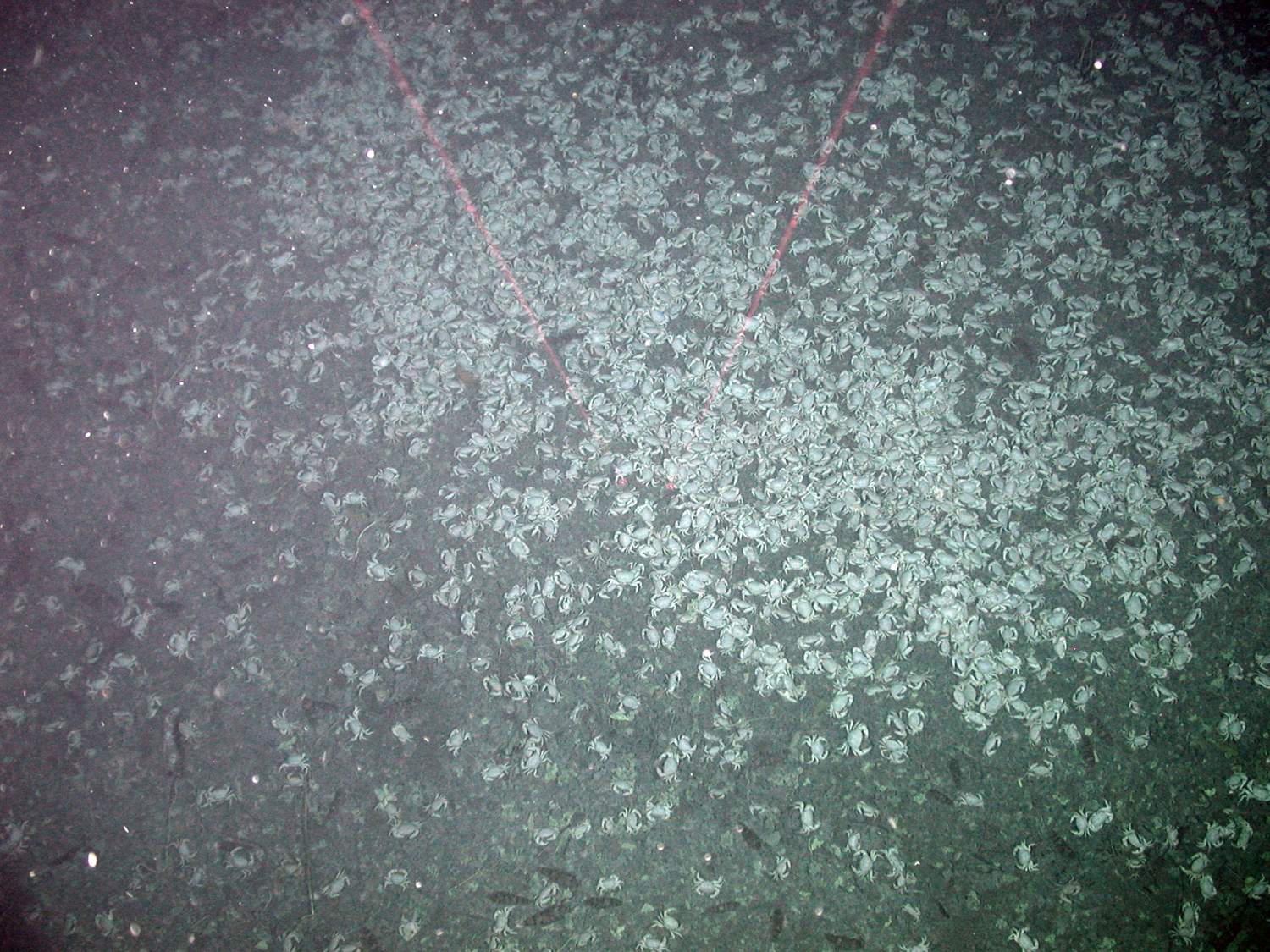
A consortium of Cyanagraea praedator crabs in an area of hydrothermal activity

== Distribution ==
Bythograeidae are almost exclusively found in the East Pacific Rise. Some exceptions include Austinograea alayseae, Austinograea williamsi and the genus Gandalfus which are found in the western Pacific and Austinograea rodriguezensis which is found only in the Central Indian Ridge.

== Ecology ==
The hydrothermal vents where these crabs live are typically short lived, lasting from 10 to 100 years. These are extreme environments, with high temperatures, high concentrations of sulphides, heavy metals, carbon dioxide and an acidic environment. At this depth there is also limited access to light, making photosynthesis nearly impossible. Instead, organisms rely on Chemosynthetic bacteria to sustain the vast amounts of life in Chemotrophic ecosystems.

Bythograeidae are omnivorous scavengers, they are believed to eat bacteria and other vent organisms however they can also be found far from active sites.

== Species ==
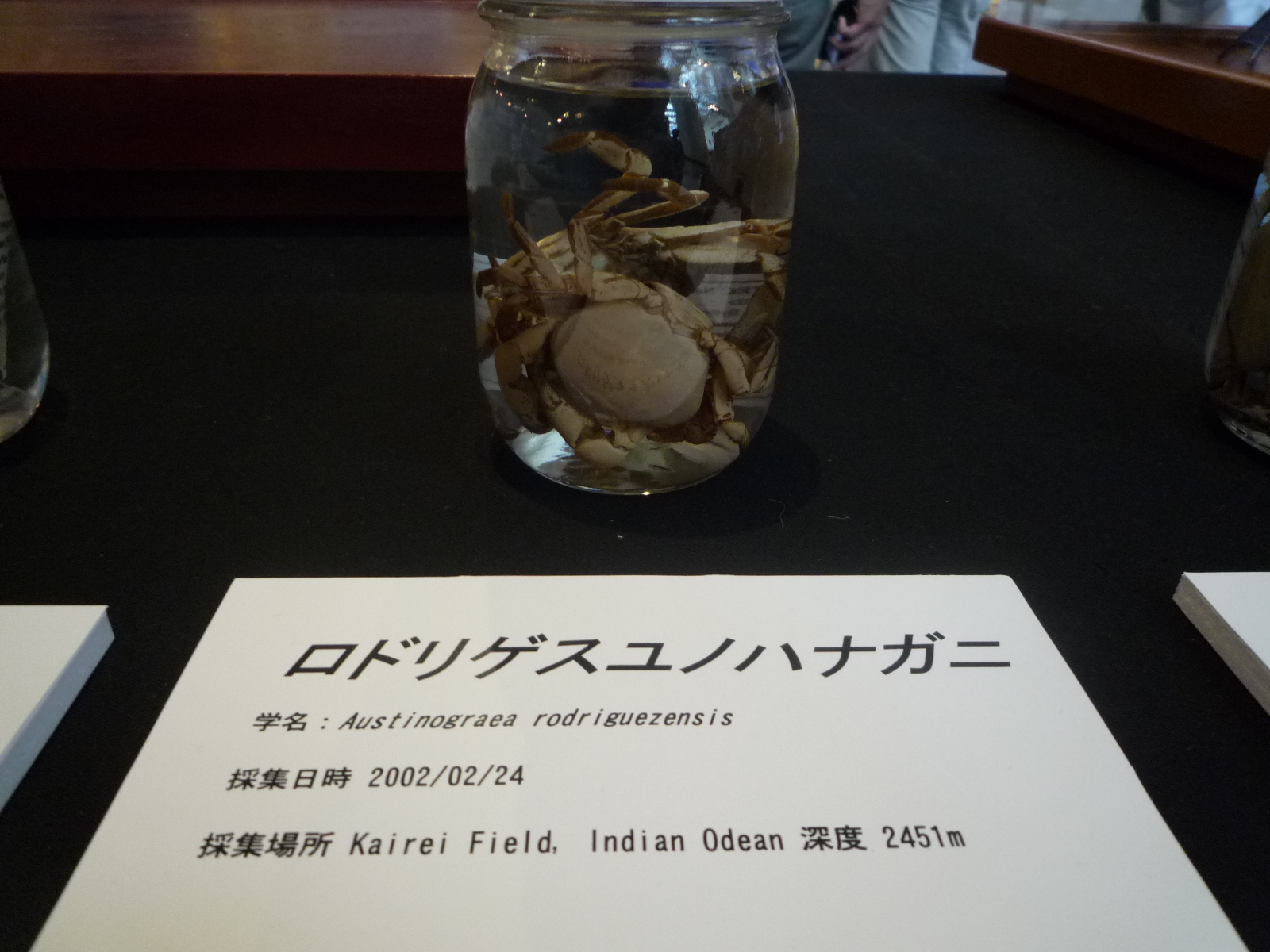
Austinograea rodriguezensis

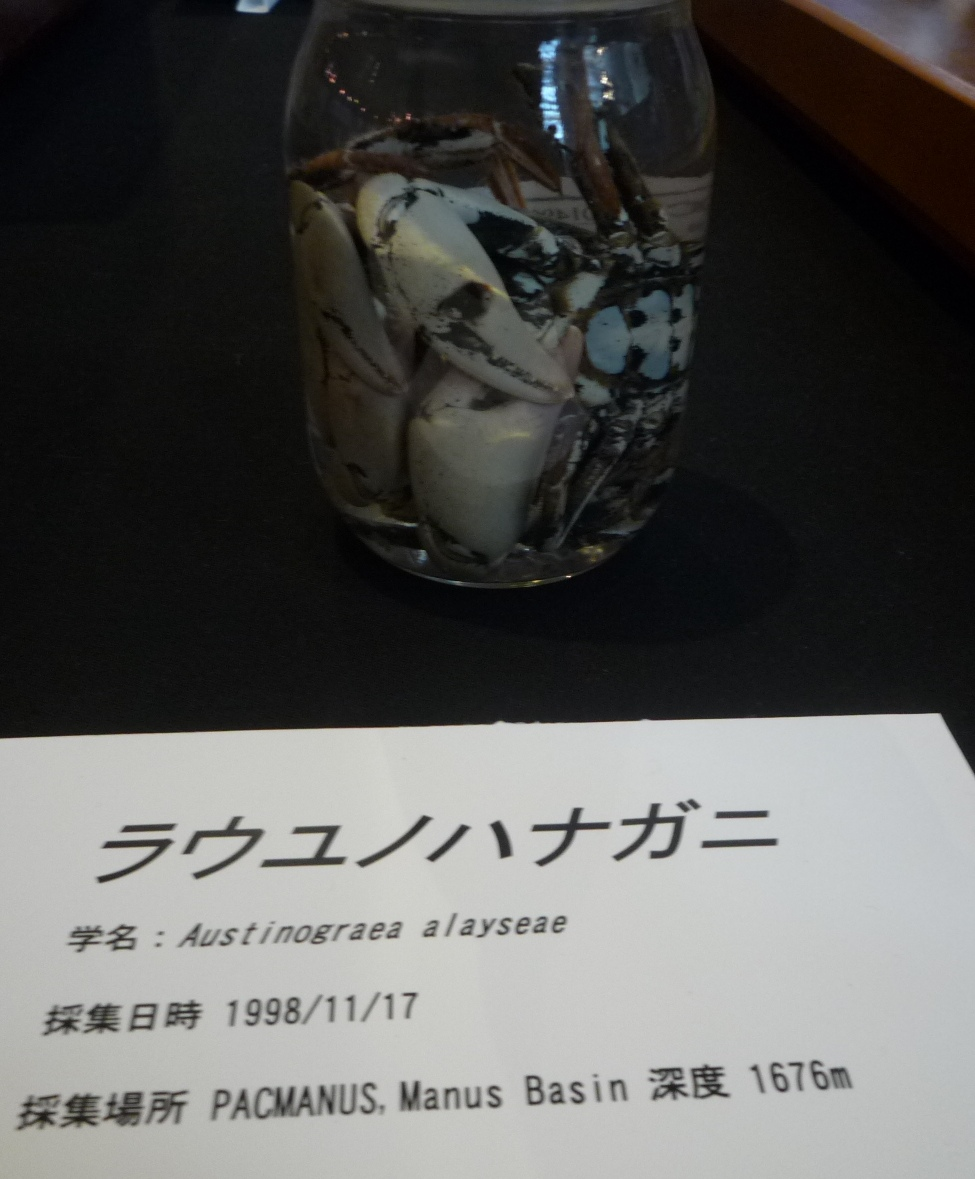
Austinograea alayseae

- Genus Allograea Guinot, Hurtado & Vrijenhoek, 2002
  - Allograea tomentosa Guinot, Hurtado & Vrijenhoek, 2002
- Genus Austinograea Hessler & Martin, 1989
  - Austinograea alayseae Guinot, 1990
  - Austinograea hourdezi Guinot & Segonzac, 2018
  - Austinograea jolliveti Guinot & Segonzac, 2018
  - Austinograea rodriguezensis Tsuchida & Hashimoto, 2002
  - Austinograea williamsi Hessler & Martin, 1989
- Genus Bythograea Williams, 1980
  - Bythograea galapagensis Guinot & Hurtado, 2003
  - Bythograea intermedia Saint Laurent, 1988
  - Bythograea laubieri Guinot & Segonzac, 1997
  - Bythograea microps Saint Laurent, 1984
  - Bythograea thermydron Williams, 1980
  - Bythograea vrijenhoeki Guinot & Hurtado, 2003
- Genus Cyanagraea Saint Laurent, 1984
  - Cyanagraea praedator Saint Laurent, 1984
- Genus Gandalfus McLay, 2007
  - Gandalfus puia McLay, 2007
  - Gandalfus yunohana (Takeda, Hashimoto & Ohta, 2000)
- Genus Segonzacia Guinot, 1989
  - Segonzacia mesatlantica (Williams, 1988)
