= BRP Gregorio Velasquez =

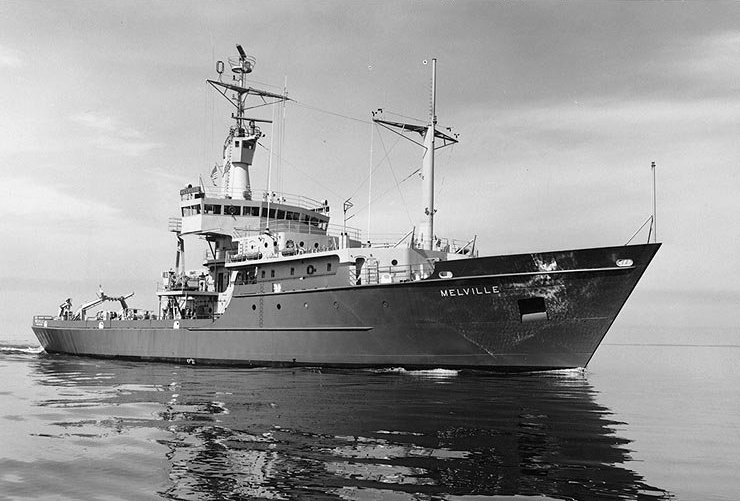
- USNS Melville (T-AGOR-14) underway off Bay City, Michigan, 9 July 1969

History

United States
- Name: Melville (1968-2016)
- Namesake: George Wallace Melville, a noted Arctic explorer and chief of the Bureau of Steam Engineering from 1887 to 1903
- Builder: Defoe Shipbuilding Company, Bay City, Michigan
- Laid down: 12 July 1967
- Launched: 10 July 1968
- Sponsored by: Mrs. Elford A. Cederberg
- Acquired: by the U.S. Navy 1 August 1969, as USNS Melville (T-AGOR-14)
- In service: 1969, for operation as R/V Melville by Scripps Institution of Oceanography, University of California, San Diego, California
- Home port: La Jolla, California
- Fate: Transferred to Philippines 29 April 2016
- Notes: Laboratory Space: 2,636 sq ft (244.9 m^{2}); Main Deck Working Area: 4,050 sq ft (376 m^{2}); Freeboard: 12 feet (3.7 m); Sewage System: MSD, 8,000 U.S. gallons (30,000 L)

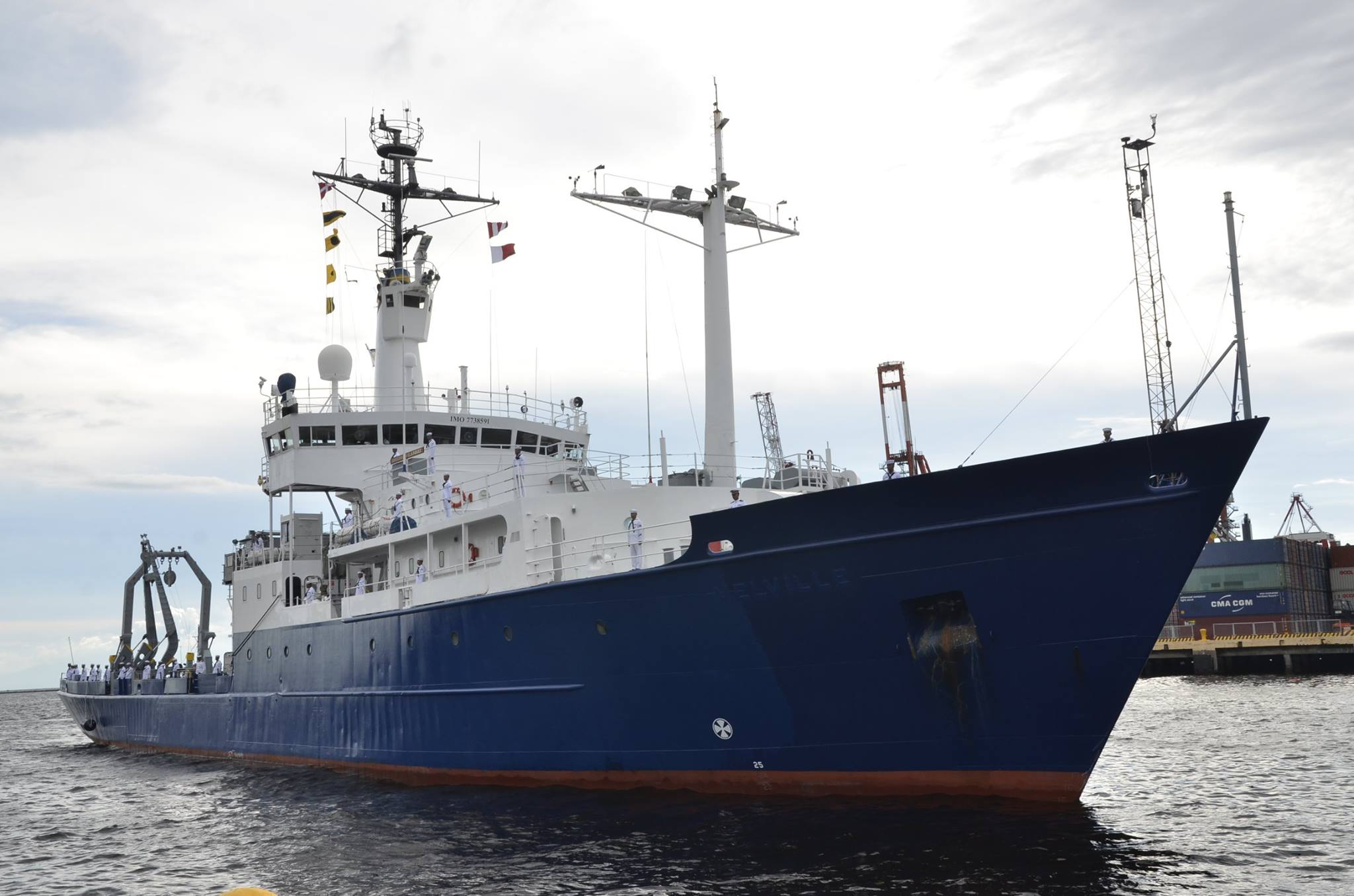

History

Philippines
- Name: Gregorio Velasquez (2016-present)
- Namesake: Gregorio Velasquez
- Acquired: by the Philippine Navy 28 April 2016
- Recommissioned: 28 April 2016
- Identification: IMO number: 7738591; MMSI number: 548115500; Callsign: 4DIIG

General characteristics
- Type: Robert D. Conrad-class oceanographic research ship
- Tonnage: 2,516 tons (7,125 m^{3})
- Displacement: 2,944 long tons (2,991 t)
- Length: 279 feet (85 m)
- Beam: 46 feet (14 m)
- Draft: 16 feet 6 inches (5.03 m) (maximum)
- Propulsion: two 1,385 hp Propulsion General Electric motors, Bow Thruster: 900 hp retractable Azimuth-compensating bow thruster, Two 1385 hp Z-Drive Lips propellers
- Speed: Cruising: 11.7 knots (21.7 km/h); Maximum: 14 knots (26 km/h); Minimum: variable to 0, any direction
- Range: Range: 10,061 nmi (18,633 km; 11,578 mi) at 11.7 knots (fuel)
- Endurance: 40 days at 11.7 knots (fuel)
- Capacity: Water Capacity: 15,900 gallons (60,200 L)
- Complement: 23 civilian mariners, 38 scientists
- Armament: none
- Notes: Fuel consumption: 3,600 gallons per day (13,600 L/d) (transit)

BRP Gregorio Velasquez is Philippine Navy's first oceanographic research vessel. It was built by the United States Navy as USNS Melville (T-AGOR-14) for university support of Navy programs. The ship was operated as the research vessel R/V Melville by the Scripps Institution of Oceanography for oceanographic research. As the R/V Melville, it was the oldest active vessel in the academic research fleet, collectively known as the University-National Oceanographic Laboratory System (UNOLS) (UNOLS). The US Government confirmed on 17 November 2015 that the Melville was to be transferred to the Philippine Navy as Excess Defense Articles (EDA)s. The vessel was officially transferred to the Philippines on 28 April 2016 and was commissioned into active service at the same time with the Philippine Navy.

== Construction ==
Melville (AGOR 14) was laid down on 12 July 1967 by the Defoe Shipbuilding Company in Bay City, Michigan, launched on 10 July 1968 sponsored by Marguerite "Peg" Kletchka Cederberg, wife of Congressman Elford Cederberg. The ship, second given the name by the Navy, was completed and delivered to the Navy on 1 August 1969 then placed in service with the Military Sea Transportation Service as USNS Melville (T-AGOR 14). Melville was chartered to the Scripps Institution of Oceanography for operation by the Office of Naval Research as part of the UNOLS fleet.

Though often listed as a Robert D. Conrad-class oceanographic research ship the ship is of an entirely different appearance, design and size as evidenced by Melville's 2,944 vs. Conrad's 1,370 loaded displacement, dimensions of 279' X 46' X 16.6' as opposed to Conrad's 208'10" X 37'5" X 15'2", general appearance and layout and, most distinctly, completely different propulsion systems and capabilities. Melville's original system was a cycloidal system with propulsion later modified to an advanced system of twin 1,385 hp diesel electric engines driving 1,385 hp Z-Drive Lips with a 900 hp Retractable Azimuthing Thruster allowing the ship to move 360° under main engines while Conrad's was single screw 2,500shp diesel-electric with a retractable azmuthing bow thruster.

=== Sister ship ===
Melville's sister ship is the R/V Knorr, best known as the ship which located the wreck of the RMS Titanic in 1985, which was also launched in 1968.

== Designation ==
Melville was named for George Melville, a pioneer arctic explorer and Rear Admiral in the United States Navy, who was Chief of the Bureau of Steam Engineering from 1887 to 1903.

== Operating personnel ==
A crew of 23 keeps the ship operational, and up to 38 scientists can be accommodated for the purposes of the scientific expedition.

== Operational history ==
Melville was configured as a general purpose oceanographic vessel of the Global Class operating world wide. The ship sailed over 1.5 million miles and crossed the equator more than 90 times. With an expected useful life of 30 years the ship underwent a service life extension in 1992 to give the additional years service before retirement after 45 years of service. In that overhaul the hull was lengthened, increasing her displacement to 2670 tons (full-load), and a new propulsion system was installed.

=== Role in the 1976 movie King Kong ===
The Melville was used in the 1976 movie King Kong, starring Jessica Lange and Jeff Bridges. It was used specifically because of its cycloid propulsion drive (at that time), which allowed it to move sideways. This type of drive is used, on research vessels, for station keeping in the ocean over drill and coring sites.

=== RISE project expedition ===
In 1979 the Melville was the lead ship of the RISE oceanographic expedition to the crest of the East Pacific Rise at 21° N off the west coast of Mexico. It was this expedition that discovered deep sea high temperature hydrothermal vents using the submersible Alvin and other oceanographic instruments.

=== Transfer to the Philippine Navy ===
In September 2014 the ship reached the end of the life cycle extension of the 1992 service life extension. After 45 years of service Melville Scripps hosted a farewell for the ship on 21 February 2015 at San Diego. The White House confirmed on 17 November 2015 that the Melville and USCGC Boutwell (WHEC-719) would be transferred to the Philippine Navy as Excess Defense Articles (EDA)s. On 29 April 2016, the ship was formally turned over and commissioned to the Philippine Navy at a ceremony held in San Diego, California. The ship was renamed BRP Gregorio Velasquez, after a Filipino National Scientist, and assigned the pennant number AGR-702. The ship is expected to provide the Philippine Navy with hydrographic survey and maritime research capabilities.
