= BRP Felix Apolinario =

Jose Andrada-class patrol craft of the Philippine Navy

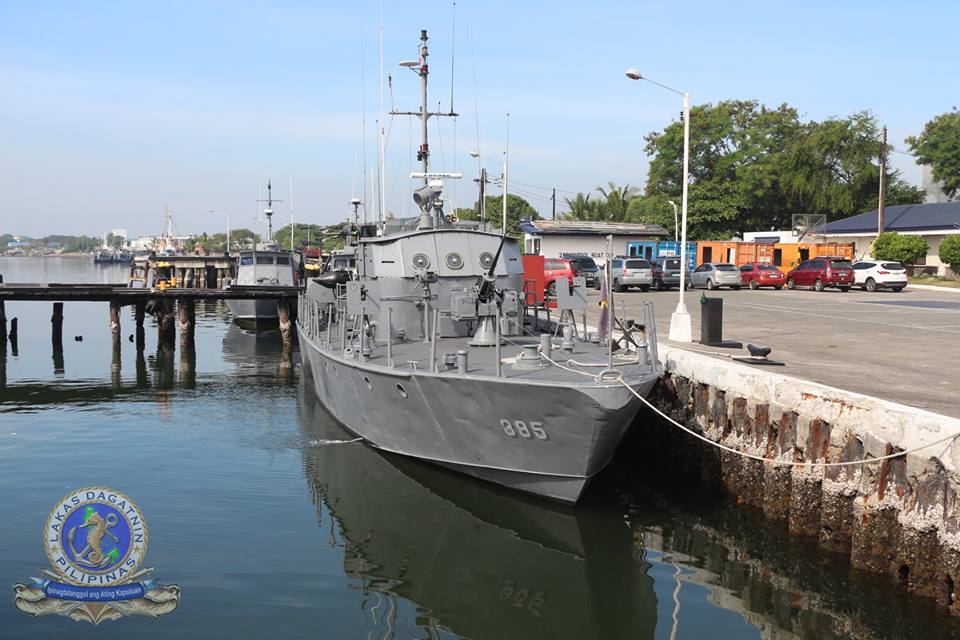
- BRP Felix Apolinario (PC-395)

History

Philippines
- Name: BRP Felix Apolinario
- Namesake: Commodore Felix Apolinaro, PN
- Commissioned: 10 October 2000
- Reclassified: April 2016: From PG-395 to PC-395
- Status: in active service

General characteristics
- Class & type: Jose Andrada-class patrol craft
- Displacement: 56.4 tons full load
- Length: 78 ft 10 in (24.03 m)
- Beam: 20 ft 7 in (6.27 m) max
- Draft: 5.8 ft (1.8 m)
- Propulsion: (Note: All sources refer to the same engine, although with different horsepower rating. But official specs from manufacturer indicates a 1,400 hp rating for each engine.); 2 × 1,400 bhp Detroit 16V-92TA Diesel Engines; 2 × 35-kW Diesel generators; 2 shafts
- Speed: 28 knots (52 km/h) maximum
- Range: 1,200 nmi (2,200 km) at 12 knots (22 km/h)
- Complement: 12
- Sensors & processing systems: Raytheon AN/SPS-64(V)11 Navigation / Surface Search Radar
- Armament: 1 × Mk.38 Mod.0 Bushmaster 25mm chain gun; 4 × Mk.26 M2HB Browning 12.7 mm/50-cal. GP machine guns; 2 × M60 7.62 mm/30-cal. GP machine guns

BRP Felix Apolinario (PC-395) is twenty-second and final ship of the Jose Andrada-class patrol craft of the Philippine Navy. She was commissioned in 2000 and is currently in active service with the Littoral Combat Force, Philippine Fleet.

== Namesake ==
Cmdre. Felix M. Apolinario, PN was born on 2 May 1918 in Santa Cruz, Manila. Poling earned the moniker “verbatim” during his senior year, because of his studiousness. After graduation, he joined the OSP, saw action in Bataan as ground support for the 1st Q-Boat Sqdn and beach defense in Lamao. After Bataan fell, he became a POW, was interned in Capas and released as a sick POW in August 1942. After the war he reported to military control and helped rebuild a new OSP that later became the Philippine Navy. He held various positions that culminated in his becoming FOIC, PN in 1965, a post he held up to his retirement in June 1966. After retirement, Poling established a company dealing with marine electronics, life saving equipment, airplane parts, firefighting and audio equipment. Poling was also a devoted golfer and played the game as a hobby for many years. He died in July 1999 at age 81.

== History ==
In 1989, the Philippines placed an order of four fast patrol craft with Trinity-Equitable (formerly Halter-Marine Equitable) for $9,400,000US. The first of the four vessels, arrived on 20 August 1990, was named Jose Andrada. The lead ship of the class was named after Jose Andrada, who was one of the original officers of the Offshore Patrol of the Philippine Commonwealth government. In April 1990, the Philippines ordered an additional ship and three more ships in August 1990. In March 1993, eleven more vessels were ordered. A total of 22 ships were acquired by the Philippine Navy by 1999.

== Design ==
The ships of her class were built to the standards of the United States Coast Guard, with an aluminum hull and superstructure. In addition, a 4-meter (13 ft) rigid inflatable boat powered by a 40-hp outboard motor is stowed amidships. She has a complement of 12. The ship is equipped with a Raytheon AN/SPS-64(V)11 Navigation/Surface Search Radar, but with a smaller antenna as those used in bigger Philippine Navy ships. Like all other Philippine Navy ships, the entire class was installed with the Philippine Navy Vessel Tracking System (VTS) by the Naval Sea Systems Command.

=== Armament ===
The ships of her class are armed with one 25 mm Bushmaster chain gun on Mk.38 Mod.0 mount on second and later batches (PG-379 to PG-395), four M2HB Browning 12.7 mm/50 caliber machine guns on Mk.26 mounts, with two positioned forward and two aft; and two M60 7.62 mm/30 caliber machine guns, both mounted amidships. The ship can carry 4,000 rounds of 12.7 mm and 2,000 rounds of 7.62 mm ammunition. A large "Big Eyes" binocular is also carried on tripod mounts, one on the forecastle and one just abaft the mast.

=== Propulsion ===
The ship is powered by two Detroit Diesel 16V-92TA diesel engines with a combined power of around 2,800 horsepower (2,100 kW), driving two propellers for a maximum speed of 28 knots (52 km/h; 32 mph). Her maximum range is about 1,200 nautical miles (2,200 km; 1,400 mi) at 12 knots (22 km/h; 14 mph), or alternatively, 600 nmi (1,100 km; 690 mi) at 24 kn (44 km/h; 28 mph).

== Operational history ==
In July 2018, the BRP Felix Apolinario participated in the second leg of the 4th Combined Maritime Security Activity (MSA) with the Royal Australian Navy (RAN) in the waters around Tawi-Tawi along with the BRP Anastacio Cacayorin (PG-387) Patrol Craft and Multi-Purpose Attack Craft (MPAC) Mk 1 (BA-482). The RAN sent the patrol vessels HMAS Ararat and HMAS Wollongong for the activity, which consists of meeting procedures, maritime patrols and ship drills.
