= BRP Anastacio Cacayorin =

History

Philippines
- Name: BRP Anastacio Cacayorin (PC-387)
- Operator: Philippine Navy
- Commissioned: 1996
- Reclassified: April 2016: from PG-387 to PC-387
- Status: in active service

General characteristics
- Class & type: Jose Andrada-class patrol craft
- Displacement: 56.4 tons full load
- Length: 78 ft 10 in (24.03 m)
- Beam: 20 ft 7 in (6.27 m) max
- Draft: 5.8 ft (1.8 m)
- Propulsion: 2 × 1,400 bhp Detroit 16V-92TA Diesel Engines (Note: All sources refer to the same engine, although with different horsepower rating. But official specs from manufacturer indicates a 1,400 hp rating for each engine.); 2 × 35-kW Diesel generators; 2 shafts
- Speed: 28 knots (52 km/h) maximum
- Range: 1,200 nmi (2,200 km) at 12 knots (22 km/h)
- Complement: 12
- Sensors & processing systems: Raytheon AN/SPS-64(V)11 Navigation / Surface Search Radar
- Armament: 1 × Mk 38 Mod 0 Bushmaster 25 mm chain gun; 4 × Mk 26 M2HB Browning 12.7 mm/50-cal. GP machine guns; 2 × M60 7.62 mm/30-cal. GP machine guns

BRP Anastacio Cacayorin (PC-387) is the sixteenth ship of the Jose Andrada-class patrol craft coastal patrol craft of the Philippine Navy. She was commissioned in 1996 and is currently in active service with the Littoral Combat Force, Philippine Fleet.

It was initially designated as Fast Patrol Craft, and was numbered "DF-387", but later on was re-designated as a Patrol Gunboat, and was finally re-numbered as "PG-387". Another round of reclassification was made in April 2016, which re-designated the patrol gunboat as the coastal patrol craft "PC-387".

== History ==
In 1989, the Philippines placed an order of 4 fast patrol craft with Trinity-Equitable (formerly Halter-Marine Equitable) for USD 9.4 million. The first of the four vessels, arrived on August 20, 1990, was named Jose Andrada. The lead ship of the class was named after Jose Andrada, who was one of the original officers of the Offshore Patrol of the Philippine Commonwealth government. In April 1990, the Philippines ordered an additional ship and 3 more ships in August 1990. In March 1993, eleven more vessels were ordered. A total of 22 ships were acquired by the Philippine Navy by 1999.

== Ship design ==
Her class was built to U.S. Coast Guard standards, with an aluminium hull and superstructure. In addition, a 4-meter rigid inflatable boat powered by a 40-hp outboard motor is stowed amidships. She has a complement of 12. The ship is equipped with a Raytheon AN/SPS-64(V)11 Navigation/Surface Search Radar, but with a smaller antenna as those used in bigger Philippine Navy ships. Like all other Philippine Navy ships, the entire class was installed with the Philippine Navy Vessel Tracking System (VTS) by the Naval Sea Systems Command.

=== Armament ===
The ships of her class are armed with one 25mm Bushmaster chain gun on Mk 38 Mod 0 mount on second and later batches (PG-379 to PG-395), four M2HB Browning 12.7 mm/50 caliber machine guns on Mk 26 mounts, with two positioned forward and two aft; and two M60 7.62 mm/30 caliber machine guns, both mounted amidships. The ship can carry 4,000 rounds of 12.7 mm and 2,000 rounds of 7.62 mm ammunition. A large "Big Eyes" binocular is also carried on tripod mounts, one on the forecastle and one just abaft the mast.

=== Propulsion ===
She is powered by two Detroit Diesel 16V-92TA Diesel Engines with a combined power of around 2,800 hp, driving two propellers for a maximum speed of 28 knots (52 km/h). Her maximum range is 1,200 nmi (2,200 km) at 12 knots (22 km/h), or alternatively, 600 nmi (1,100 km) at 24 knots (44 km/h).

== Operational history ==
In July 2018, the BRP Anastacio Cacayorin participated in the second leg of the 4th Combined Maritime Security Activity (MSA) with the Royal Australian Navy (RAN) in the waters around Tawi-Tawi along with the BRP Felix Apolinario (PG-395) Patrol Craft and Multi-Purpose Attack Craft (MPAC) Mk 1 (BA-482). The RAN sent the patrol vessels HMAS Ararat and HMAS Wollongong for the activity which consists of Meeting Procedures, Maritime Patrols and Ship Drills.

In February 2019, the ship while on Routine Patrol spotted and rescued the wooden-hulled motor launch M/L Jomong and its crew of seven off the coast of Tawi-Tawi. The Jomong was traveling from Sitangkai to Bongao with 5,000 board feet of lumber when its engine suddenly shut off due to a mechanical defect. The ship's hull was also later damaged due to big waves that battered it while adrift. The BRP Anastacio Cacayorin later towed the Jomong to the Bongao Pier and dropped its crew there.
