= BRP Dioscoro Papa =

Philippine Navy patrol boat

History

Philippines
- Name: BRP Dioscoro Papa (PC-381)
- Operator: Philippine Navy
- Ordered: March 1993
- Builder: Trinity-Equitable Shipyards, New Orleans, US
- Acquired: 25 April 1995
- Commissioned: 1 June 1995
- Reclassified: April 2016: from PG-381 to PC-381
- Status: in active service

General characteristics
- Class & type: Jose Andrada-class coastal patrol craft
- Displacement: 56.4 tons full load
- Length: 78 ft (24 m)
- Beam: 20 ft (6.1 m)
- Draft: 5.8 ft (1.8 m)
- Propulsion: 2 × 1,400 bhp Detroit 16V-92TA diesel engines (Note: All sources refer to the same engine, although with different horsepower rating. But official specs from manufacturer indicates a 1,400 hp rating for each engine.); 2 × 35 kW diesel generators; 2 shafts
- Speed: 28 knots (52 km/h) maximum
- Range: 1,200 nmi (2,200 km) at 12 knots (22 km/h)
- Boats & landing craft carried: 4-meter rigid inflatable boat at aft
- Complement: 12
- Sensors & processing systems: Raytheon AN/SPS-64(V)11 Navigation / Surface Search Radar
- Armament: 1 × Mk.38 Mod.0 Bushmaster 25 mm chain gun; 4 × Mk.26 M2HB Browning 12.7 mm/50 cal. GP machine guns; 2 × M60 7.62 mm/30 cal. GP machine guns

BRP Dioscoro Papa (PC-381) is the eleventh ship of the Jose Andrada-class coastal patrol boats of the Philippine Navy. It is part of the second batch of its class ordered through US Foreign Military Sales (FMS) in 1993, and was commissioned with the Philippine Navy on 1 June 1995.

It was initially designated as a Fast Patrol Craft, and was numbered "DF-381", but later on was re-designated as a Patrol Gunboat, and was finally re-numbered as "PG-381". Another round of reclassification was made in April 2016, which re-designated the patrol gunboat as the coastal patrol craft "PC-381".

== Technical details ==
The ship was built to US Coast Guard standards with aluminium hull and superstructure. She is powered by two Detroit Diesel 16V-92TA diesel engines with a combined power of around 2,800 horsepower (2,100 kW) driving two propellers for a maximum speed of 28 knots (52 km/h; 32 mph). The vessel's maximum range is 1,200 nautical miles (2,200 km; 1,400 mi) at 12 knots (22 km/h; 14 mph), or alternatively 600 nautical miles (1,100 km; 690 mi) at 24 knots (44 km/h; 28 mph).

The ship was originally designed to carry one bow-mounted Mk.3 40 mm (1.6 in) gun, one 81 mm (3.2 in) mortar aft, and four 12.7 mm (0.50 in)/50-calibre machine guns. Instead, she is armed with one 25 mm (0.98 in) Bushmaster chain gun on a Mk.38 Mod.0 mount, four M2HB Browning 12.7 mm/50-calibre machine guns on Mk.26 mounts, with two positioned forward and two aft; and two M60 7.62 mm/30-calibre machine guns, both mounted amidships. The ship can carry 4,000 rounds of 12.7 mm and 2,000 rounds of 7.62 mm. A large "Big Eyes" binocular is also carried on tripod mounts, one on the forecastle and one just above the mast. As part of the second batch (PG-379 to PG-395), it is equipped with a Mk.38 Mod.0 M242 Bushmaster 25 mm chain gun that the first batch of ships do not carry.

The patrol craft is equipped with a Raytheon AN/SPS-64(V)11 surface search and navigation radar but with a smaller antenna as those used in bigger Philippine Navy ships. Like all other Philippine Navy ships, Dioscoro Papa was fitted with the Philippine Navy Vessel Tracking System (VTS) by the Naval Sea Systems Command.

A 4-metre (13 ft) rigid inflatable boat powered by a 40 hp (30 kW) outboard motor is stowed amidships.

== Notable deployments ==
On 22 January 1996, Dioscoro Papa (then designated PG-381) was conducting anti-piracy patrols in off the coast of Capones Island, Zambales. During the vessel's patrol it encountered what its crew alleged were naval vessels sporting Chinese bow numbers and flying Chinese flags which were quickly entering Philippine territorial waters. Dioscoro Papa's crew reported as having fired warning shots at the vessels, which responded by firing back resulting in a 90-minute gun battle. One of the vessels reportedly attempted to ram Dioscoro Papa, but was foiled due to incurring casualties from Dioscoro Papa's gunfire. After incurring crew casualties the vessels fled to the high seas with Dioscoro Papa opting not to pursue due to having depleted its ammunition and fuel during the encounter.

On 11 May 2016, Dioscoro Papa towed ML Rabson back to safety to Tawi-Tawi. Rabson was carrying 120 passengers who had been to Sitangkai town for the elections when it suffered engine trouble, and had been stranded for more than three hours.

In May 2018, Dioscoro Papa participated in the "Third Combined Maritime Security Activity" with the Royal Australian Navy (RAN) along with the BRP General Mariano Alvarez, BRP Anastacio Cacayorin, BRP Cebu and BRP Filipino Flojo. The RAN sent the vessels HMAS Albany and HMAS Glenelg for the exercise.
