= BRP Federico Martir =

Coastal patrol craft of Philippines Navy

History

Philippines
- Name: BRP Federico Martir (PC-385)
- Operator: Philippine Navy
- Reclassified: April 2016: from PG-385 to PC-385
- Status: in active service

General characteristics
- Class & type: Jose Andrada-class patrol craft
- Displacement: 56.4 tons full load
- Length: 78 ft 10 in (24.03 m)
- Beam: 20 ft 7 in (6.27 m) max
- Draft: 5.8 ft (1.8 m)
- Propulsion: 2 × 1,400 bhp Detroit 16V-92TA Diesel Engines (Note: All sources refer to the same engine, although with different horsepower rating. But official specs from manufacturer indicates a 1,400 hp rating for each engine.); 2 × 35-kW Diesel generators; 2 shafts
- Speed: 28 knots (52 km/h) maximum
- Range: 1,200 nmi (2,200 km) at 12 knots (22 km/h)
- Complement: 12
- Sensors & processing systems: Raytheon AN/SPS-64(V)11 Navigation / Surface Search Radar
- Armament: 1 × Mk.38 Mod.0 Bushmaster 25 mm chain gun; 4 × Mk.26 M2HB Browning 12.7 mm/50-cal. GP machine guns; 2 × M60 7.62 mm/30-cal. GP machine guns

BRP Federico Martir (PC-385) is fourteenth ship of the Jose Andrada-class patrol craft coastal patrol craft of the Philippine Navy. It is part of the second batch of its class ordered through US Foreign Military Sales (FMS) in 1993, and was commissioned with the Philippine Navy on 22 May 1996. She is currently in active service with the Littoral Combat Force, Philippine Fleet.

It was initially designated as Fast Patrol Craft, and was numbered "DF-385", but later on was re-designated as a Patrol Gunboat, and was finally re-numbered as "PG-385". Another round of reclassification was made in April 2016, which re-designated the patrol gunboat as the coastal patrol craft "PC-385".

== History ==
In 1989, the Philippines placed an order of 4 fast patrol craft with Trinity-Equitable (formerly Halter-Marine Equitable) for USD 9.4 million. The first of the four vessels, arrived on August 20, 1990, was named Jose Andrada. The lead ship of the class was named after Jose Andrada, who was one of the original officers of the Offshore Patrol of the Philippine Commonwealth government. In April 1990, the Philippines ordered an additional ship and 3 more ships in August 1990. In March 1993, eleven more vessels were ordered. A total of 22 ships were acquired by the Philippine Navy by 1999.

== Ship Design ==
Her class was built to U.S. Coast Guard standards, with an aluminium hull and superstructure. In addition, a 4-meter rigid inflatable boat powered by a 40-hp outboard motor is stowed amidships. She has a complement of 12. The ship is equipped with a Raytheon AN/SPS-64(V)11 Navigation/Surface Search Radar, but with a smaller antenna as those used in bigger Philippine Navy ships. Like all other Philippine Navy ships, the entire class was installed with the Philippine Navy Vessel Tracking System (VTS) by the Naval Sea Systems Command.

=== Armament ===
The ships of her class are armed with one 25mm Bushmaster chain gun on Mk.38 Mod.0 mount on second and later batches (PG-379 to PG-395), four M2HB Browning 12.7 mm/50 caliber machine guns on Mk.26 mounts, with two positioned forward and two aft; and two M60 7.62 mm/30 caliber machine guns, both mounted amidships. The ship can carry 4,000 rounds of 12.7 mm and 2,000 rounds of 7.62 mm ammunition. A large "Big Eyes" binocular is also carried on tripod mounts, one on the forecastle and one just abaft the mast.

=== Propulsion ===
She is powered by two Detroit Diesel 16V-92TA Diesel Engines with a combined power of around 2,800 hp, driving two propellers for a maximum speed of 28 knots (52 km/h). Her maximum range is 1,200 nmi (2,200 km) at 12 knots (22 km/h), or alternatively, 600 nmi (1,100 km) at 24 knots (44 km/h).

=== Operational history ===
In March 2018, the BRP Martir rescued 20 passengers of the motor boat Queen Cleopatra northeast off Miniloc Island in Palawan while on a routine patrol. The Queen Cleopatra suffered engine trouble but was fortunate enough to be along the patrol craft's route. Her passengers were evacuated and she was towed towards the shoreline.

In May 2019, the ship participated in a Search and Rescue Exercise (SAREX) with the JS Samidare (DD-106) Destroyer of the Japan Maritime Self Defense Force (JMSDF) off the coast of Eastern Palawan. The exercise's aim was to expand information sharing, improve interoperability and gain work experience between the two navies.
