= Jose Andrada-class patrol craft =

Philippine Navy vessel

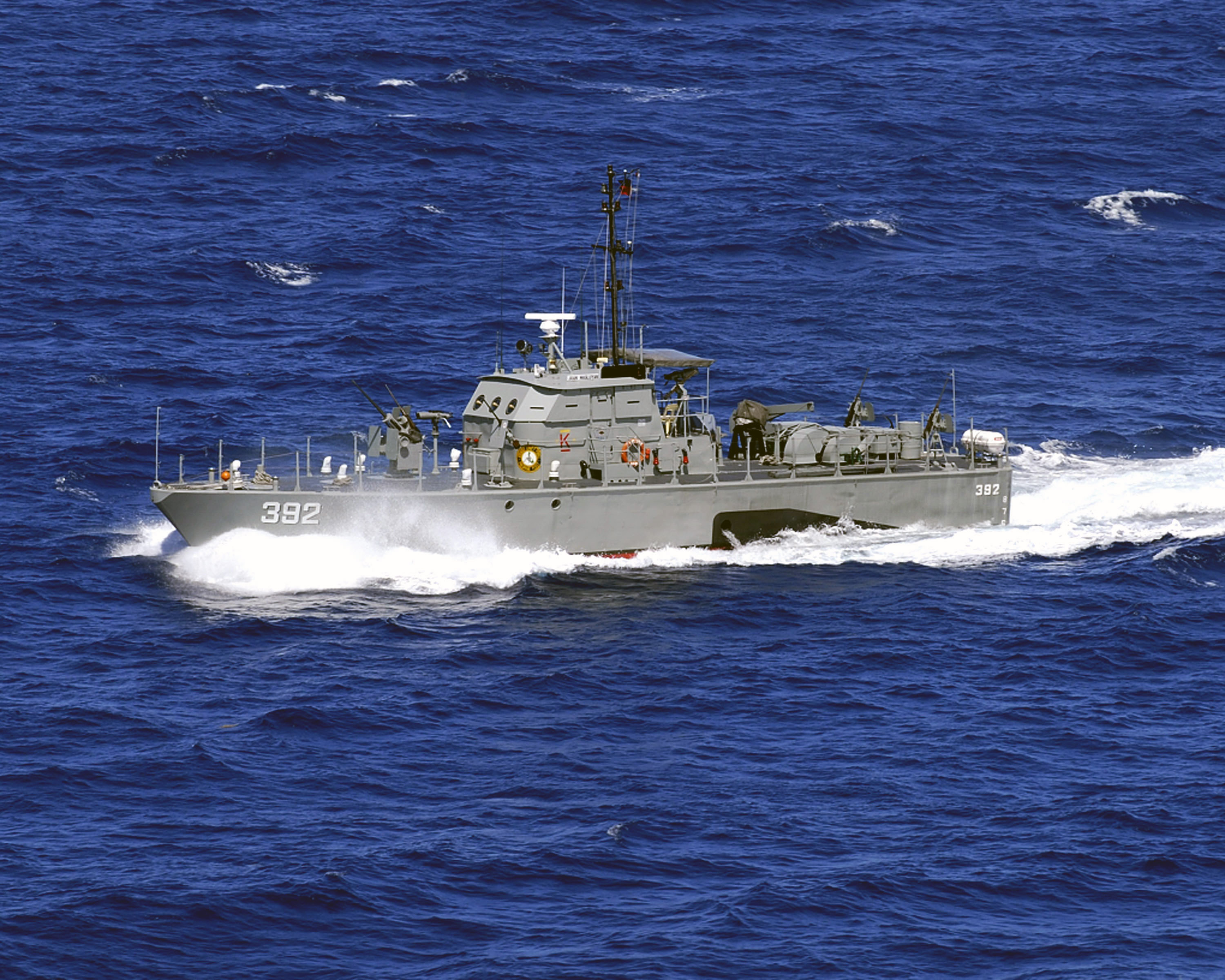
- BRP Juan Magluyan (PC 392), 20th boat of Jose Andrada-class patrol boat.

Class overview
- Builders: Trinity-Equitable SY, New Orleans, USA & Atlantic Gulf & Pacific Co., Batangas, Philippines
- Operators: Philippine Navy
- Built: 1989-2000
- In commission: 1990-present
- Planned: 35
- Completed: 22
- Canceled: 13
- Active: 22

General characteristics
- Type: Patrol Boat (WPB)
- Displacement: 56.4 tons full load
- Length: 78 ft 10 in (24.03 m)
- Beam: 20 ft 7 in (6.27 m) max
- Draft: 5.8 ft (1.8 m)
- Propulsion: 2 × 1,400 bhp Detroit 16V-92TA Diesel Engines (Note: All sources refer to the same engine, although with different horsepower rating. But official specs from manufacturer indicates a 1,400 hp rating for each engine.); 2 × 35-kW Diesel generators; 2 shafts
- Speed: 28 knots (52 km/h) maximum
- Range: 1,200 nmi (2,200 km) at 12 knots (22 km/h)
- Complement: 12
- Sensors & processing systems: Raytheon AN/SPS-64(V)11 Navigation / Surface Search Radar
- Armament: 1 × Mk.38 Mod.0 Bushmaster 25mm chain gun (PG-379 to PG-395); 4 × Mk.26 M2HB Browning 12.7 mm/50-cal. GP machine guns; 2 × M60 7.62 mm/30-cal. GP machine guns
- Aircraft carried: none
- Aviation facilities: none

The Jose Andrada class is a ship class of twenty-two coastal patrol boats currently in service with the Philippine Navy.

== History ==
In 1989, the Philippines placed an order of 4 fast patrol craft with Trinity-Equitable (formerly Halter-Marine Equitable) for USD9.4 million. The first of the four vessels, arrived on August 20, 1990, was named BRP Jose Andrada (PG-370). The lead ship of the class was named after Jose Andrada, who was one of the original officers of the Offshore Patrol of the Philippine Commonwealth government. In April 1990, the Philippines ordered an additional ship and 3 more ships in August 1990. In March 1993, eleven more vessels were ordered. A total of 22 ships were acquired by the Philippines by 1999.

It was initially designated as Fast Patrol Craft, and was classified with a hull initial "DF", but later on was re-designated as a Patrol Gunboat, and was finally re-designated as "PG".

== Technical Details ==
The class was built to US Coast Guard standards with aluminium hull and superstructure. She is powered by two Detroit Diesel 16V-92TA Diesel Engines with a combined power of around 2,800 hp driving two propellers for a maximum speed of 28 knots (52 km/h). Maximum range is 1,200 nmi (2,200 km) at 12 knots (22 km/h), or alternatively 600 nmi (1,100 km) at 24 knots (44 km/h).

The ship class was originally designed to carry one bow Mk.3 40 mm gun, one 81 mm mortar aft, and four 12.7 mm/50 caliber machine guns. Instead, the class are armed with one 25mm Bushmaster chain gun on Mk.38 Mod.0 mount on second and later batches (PG-379 to PG-395), four M2HB Browning 12.7 mm/50 caliber machine guns on Mk.26 mounts, with two positioned forward and two aft; and two M60 7.62 mm/30 caliber machine guns, both mounted amidships. The ship can carry 4,000 rounds of 12.7 mm and 2,000 rounds of 7.62 mm A large "Big Eyes" binocular is also carried on tripod mounts, one on the forecastle and one just abaft the mast.

The Mk.38 Mod.0 M242 Bushmaster 25mm chain gun was not installed on the first batch of boats (PG-370 to PG-378).

All are equipped with a Raytheon AN/SPS-64(V)11 surface search and navigation radar but with a smaller antenna as those used in bigger Philippine Navy ships. Like all other Philippine Navy ships, the entire class was installed with the Philippine Navy Vessel Tracking System (VTS) by the Naval Sea Systems Command.

A 4-meter rigid inflatable boat powered by a 40-hp outboard motor is stowed amidships.

== Ships in Class ==
Bow number	Ship name	Acquired	Commissioned	Service	Status
PC-370	BRP Jose Andrada	21 August 1990	August 1990	Littoral Combat Force, Philippine Fleet	Active
PC-371	BRP Enrique Jurado	13 December 1990	24 June 1991	Littoral Combat Force, Philippine Fleet	Active
PC-372	BRP Alfredo Peckson	26 April 1991	24 June 1991	Littoral Combat Force, Philippine Fleet	Active
PC-374	BRP Simeon Castro	26 April 1991	24 June 1991	Littoral Combat Force, Philippine Fleet	Active
PC-375	BRP Carlos Albert	26 April 1991	January 1992	Littoral Combat Force, Philippine Fleet	Active
PC-376	BRP Heracleo Alano	11 September 1991	January 1992	Littoral Combat Force, Philippine Fleet	Active
PC-377	BRP Liberato Picar	9 October 1991	January 1992	Littoral Combat Force, Philippine Fleet	Active
PC-378	BRP Hilario Ruiz	6 November 1991	1 June 1995	Littoral Combat Force, Philippine Fleet	Active
PC-379	BRP Rafael Pargas	1 February 1995	1 June 1995	Littoral Combat Force, Philippine Fleet	Active
PC-380	BRP Nestor Reinoso	1 February 1995	1 June 1995	Littoral Combat Force, Philippine Fleet	Active
PC-381	BRP Dioscoro Papa	25 April 1995	1 June 1995	Littoral Combat Force, Philippine Fleet	Active
PC-383	BRP Ismael Lomibao	1 February 1995	1995	Littoral Combat Force, Philippine Fleet	Active
PC-384	BRP Leovigildo Gantioqui		22 May 1996	Littoral Combat Force, Philippine Fleet	Active
PC-385	BRP Federico Martir		22 May 1996	Littoral Combat Force, Philippine Fleet	Active
PC-386	BRP Filipino Flojo		22 May 1996	Littoral Combat Force, Philippine Fleet	Active
PC-387	BRP Anastacio Cacayorin		1996	Littoral Combat Force, Philippine Fleet	Active
PC-388	BRP Manuel Gomez		1996	Littoral Combat Force, Philippine Fleet	Active
PC-389	BRP Teotimo Figoracion		1996	Littoral Combat Force, Philippine Fleet	Active
PC-390	BRP Jose Loor Sr.	1997	1997	Littoral Combat Force, Philippine Fleet	Active
PC-392	BRP Juan Magluyan		March 1998	Littoral Combat Force, Philippine Fleet	Active
PC-393	BRP Florencio Inigo		July 1998	Littoral Combat Force, Philippine Fleet	Active
PC-395	BRP Felix Apolinaro		20 October 2000	Littoral Combat Force, Philippine Fleet	Active

== Gallery ==
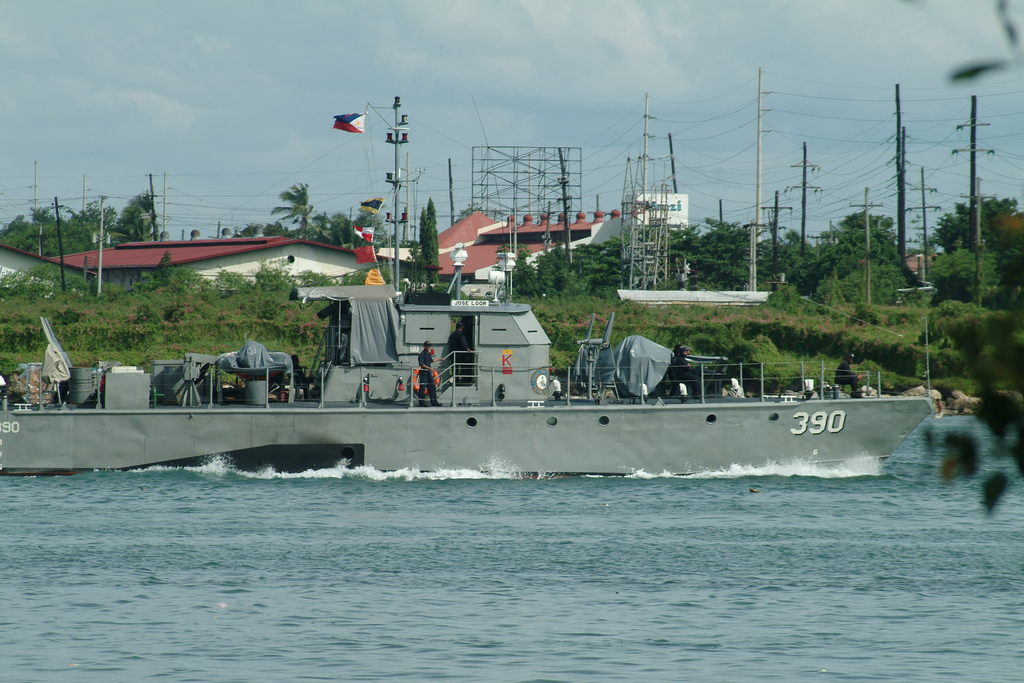
BRP Jose Loor (PG-390)
