= Wollongong (disambiguation) =

Wollongong is a seaside city in the Illawarra region of New South Wales, Australia.

Wollongong may also refer to:

- City of Wollongong, a local government area in the Illawarra region of New South Wales, Australia
- Electoral district of Wollongong, New South Wales, Australia
- HMAS Wollongong, a list of ships
- Shellharbour Airport, also referred to as Wollongong Airport
- Wollongong Group, an American software company
- University of Wollongong
