= BRP Heracleo Alano =

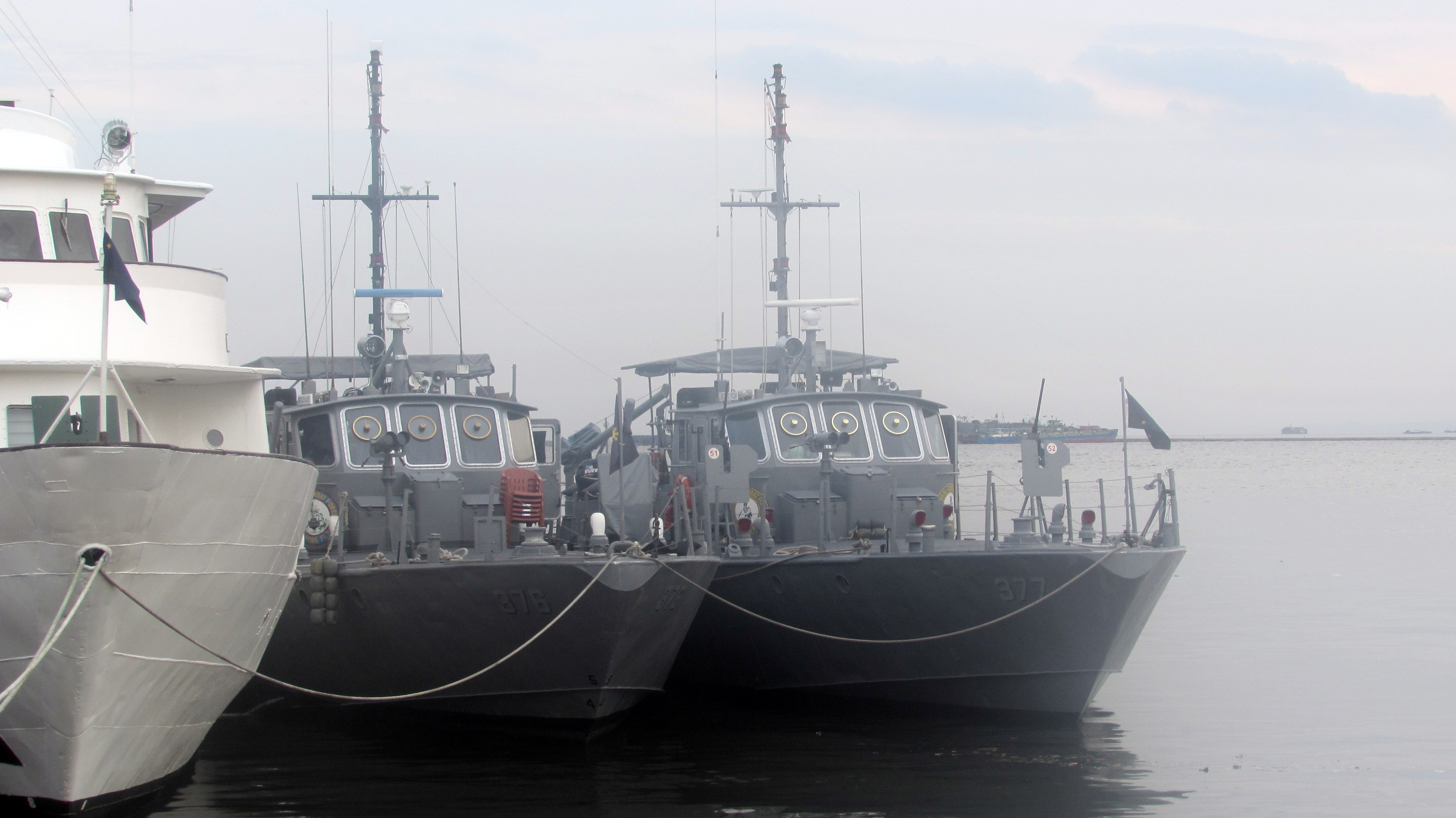
- BRP Heracleo Alano (PC-376) and BRP Liberato Picar (PC-377)

History

Philippines
- Name: Heracleo Alano
- Namesake: Lt. Heracleo Alano
- Ordered: August 1990
- Builder: Trinity-Equitable Shipyards, New Orleans
- Acquired: 11 September 1991
- Commissioned: January 1992
- Reclassified: April 2016: from PG-376 to PC-376
- Identification: PC-376
- Status: in active service

General characteristics
- Class & type: Jose Andrada-class patrol craft
- Type: Coastal Patrol Craft
- Displacement: 56.4 tons full load
- Length: 78 ft (24 m)
- Beam: 20 ft (6.1 m)
- Draft: 5.8 ft (1.8 m)
- Propulsion: 2 × 1,400 bhp Detroit 16V-92TA Diesel Engines (Note: All sources refer to the same engine, although with different horsepower rating. But official specs from manufacturer indicates a 1,400 hp rating for each engine.); 2 × 35-kW Diesel generators; 2 shafts
- Speed: 28 knots (52 km/h) maximum
- Range: 1,200 nmi (2,200 km) at 12 knots (22 km/h)
- Boats & landing craft carried: 4-meter rigid inflatable boat at aft
- Complement: 12
- Sensors & processing systems: Raytheon AN/SPS-64(V)11 Navigation / Surface Search Radar
- Armament: 4 × Mk.26 M2HB Browning 12.7 mm/50-cal. GP machine guns; 2 × M60 7.62 mm/30-cal. GP machine guns

BRP Heracleo Alano (PC-376) is the sixth ship of the Jose Andrada-class coastal patrol boats of the Philippine Navy. It is part of the first batch of its class ordered through U.S. Foreign Military Sales (FMS) in 1990, and was commissioned with the Philippine Navy in January 1992. It was initially designated as Fast Patrol Craft, and was numbered "DF-376", but later on was re-designated as a Patrol Gunboat, and was finally re-numbered as "PG-376". Another round of reclassification was made in April 2016, which redesignated the patrol gunboat as the coastal patrol craft BRP Heracleo Alano (PC-376)

== Technical details ==
The ship was built to U.S. Coast Guard standards with aluminum hull and superstructure. She is powered by two Detroit Diesel 16V-92TA Diesel Engines with a combined power of around 2,800 hp driving two propellers for a maximum speed of 28 knots (52 km/h). Maximum range is 1,200 nmi (2,200 km) at 12 knots (22 km/h), or alternatively 600 nmi (1,100 km) at 24 knots (44 km/h).

The ship originally designed to carry one bow Mk.3 40 mm gun, one 81 mm mortar aft, and four 12.7 mm/50 caliber machine guns. Instead, she is armed with only four M2HB Browning 12.7 mm/50 caliber machine guns on Mk.26 mounts, with two positioned forward and two aft; and two M60 7.62 mm/30 caliber machine guns, both mounted amidships. The ship can carry 4,000 rounds of 12.7 mm and 2,000 rounds of 7.62 mm A large "Big Eyes" binocular is also carried on tripod mounts, one on the forecastle and one just above the mast.

As part of the first batch (PG-370 to PG-378), it is not equipped with Mk.38 Mod.0 Bushmaster 25mm chain gun. (Note: Sources vary on weapons mount of this ship, with most indicating the presence of a Bushmaster 25mm chain gun on a Mk.38 mount. Recent photos does not show said weapon or mount, so are other ships from the first batch (PG-370 to PG-378)). She was also the test ship for Project "Trident Strike" remote operated gun mount system of the Philippine Navy Naval Sea Systems Command and Mapua Institute of Technology. The installation either a stabilized or unstabilized M242 25 mm Bushmaster chain gun on her bow after some minor modifications, however these plans did not materialize. On May 2022, she was used as the test ship for Project BUHAWI, a successor program to Trident Strike, which also involved the installation and test firing of a prototype remote controlled weapon station on the vessel.

She is equipped with a Raytheon AN/SPS-64(V)11 surface search and navigation radar but with a smaller antenna as those used in bigger Philippine Navy ships.

A 4-meter rigid inflatable boat powered by a 40-hp outboard motor is stowed amidships.

== Service history ==
In August 2006, as part of a Philippine Navy Task Group, Heracleo Alano, together with Bacolod City, Teotimo Figuracion, Apolinario Mabini, joined their United States Navy counterparts including USS Tortuga, USS Hopper, USS Crommelin, USS Salvor, and U.S. Coast Guard ship USCGC Sherman in the CARAT 2006 naval exercises
