= BRP Liberato Picar =

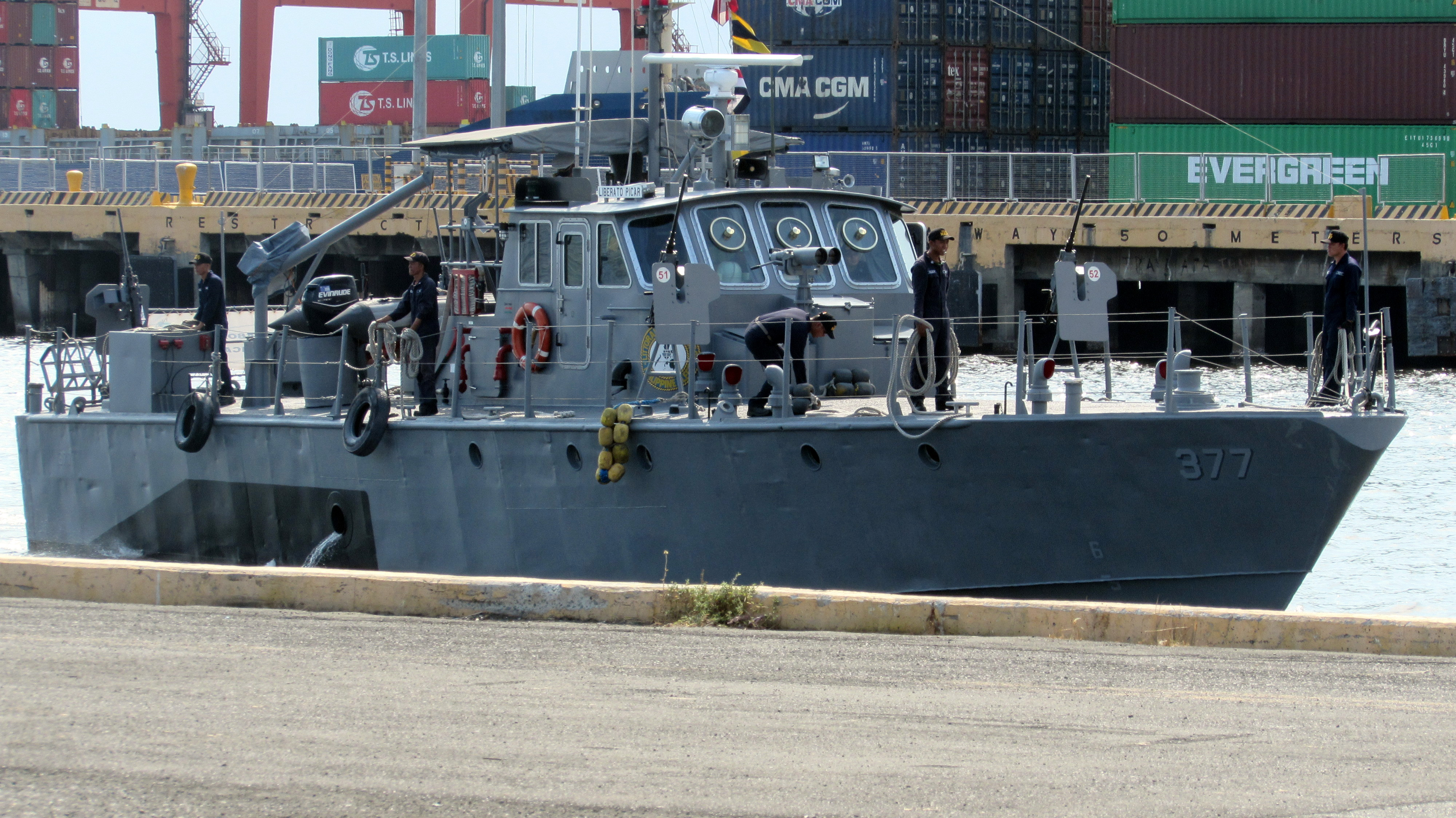
- BRP Liberato Picar (PC-377)

History

Philippines
- Name: Liberato Picar
- Namesake: Capt. Liberato Picar the officer of the Offshore Patrol. Graduated from the PMA Batch 1940.
- Operator: Philippine Navy
- Ordered: 1990
- Builder: Trinity-Equitable Shipyards, New Orleans, USA
- Acquired: 9 October 1991
- Commissioned: January 1992
- Reclassified: April 2016: from PG-377 to PC-377
- Status: in active service

General characteristics
- Class & type: Jose Andrada class
- Type: Coastal Patrol Craft
- Displacement: 56.4 tons full load
- Length: 78 ft (24 m)
- Beam: 20 ft (6.1 m)
- Draft: 5.8 ft (1.8 m)
- Propulsion: 2 × 1,400 bhp Detroit 16V-92TA Diesel Engines (Note: All sources refer to the same engine, although with different horsepower rating. But official specs from manufacturer indicates a 1,400 hp rating for each engine.); 2 × 35-kW Diesel generators; 2 shafts
- Speed: 28 knots (52 km/h) maximum
- Range: 1,200 nmi (2,200 km) at 12 knots (22 km/h)
- Boats & landing craft carried: 4-meter rigid inflatable boat at aft
- Complement: 12
- Sensors & processing systems: Raytheon AN/SPS-64(V)11 Navigation / Surface Search Radar
- Armament: 4 × Mk.26 M2HB Browning 12.7 mm/50-cal. GP machine guns; 2 × M60 7.62 mm/30-cal. GP machine guns

BRP Liberato Picar (PC-377) is the seventh ship of the Jose Andrada class coastal patrol boats of the Philippine Navy. It is part of the first batch of its class ordered through US Foreign Military Sales (FMS) in 1990, and was commissioned with the Philippine Navy in January 1992. It was initially designated as Fast Patrol Craft, and was numbered "DF-377", but later on was re-designated as Patrol Gunboat "PG-377". Another round of reclassification was made in April 2016, which redesignated the patrol gunboat as the coastal patrol craft PC-377.

== Technical Details ==
The ship was built to US Coast Guard standards with an aluminum hull and superstructure. She is powered by two Detroit Diesel 16V-92TA Diesel Engines with a combined power of around 2,800 hp driving two propellers for a maximum speed of 28 knots (52 km/h). Maximum range is 1,200 nmi (2,200 km) at 12 knots (22 km/h), or alternatively 600 nmi (1,100 km) at 24 knots (44 km/h).

The ship was originally designed to carry one bow Mk.3 40 mm gun, one 81 mm mortar aft, and four 12.7 mm/50 caliber machine guns. Instead, she is armed with only four M2HB Browning 12.7 mm/50 caliber machine guns on Mk.26 mounts, with two positioned forward and two aft; and two M60 7.62 mm/30 caliber machine guns, both mounted amidships. The ship can carry 4,000 rounds of 12.7 mm and 2,000 rounds of 7.62 mm A large "Big Eyes" binocular is also carried on tripod mounts, one on the forecastle and one just above the mast.

As part of the first batch (PG-370 to PG-378), it is not equipped with Mk.38 Mod.0 M242 Bushmaster 25mm chain gun that her other sister ships carry. (Note: Sources vary on weapons mount of this ship, with most indicating the presence of a Bushmaster 25mm chain gun on a Mk.38 mount. Recent photos does not show said weapon or mount, so are other ships from the first batch (PG-370 to PG-378)) It was planned to install either a stabilized or unstabilized M242 25 mm Bushmaster chain gun on her bow after some minor modifications, but as of to date has not materialized.

She is equipped with a Raytheon AN/SPS-64(V)11 surface search and navigation radar but with a smaller antenna as those used in bigger Philippine Navy ships. In February 2009, she was installed with the Philippine Navy Vessel Tracking System (VTS) by the Naval Sea Systems Command, and was tested by the Naval Communications Electronics and Information Systems Center (NCEISC) of the Philippine Navy.

A 4-meter rigid inflatable boat powered by a 40-hp outboard motor is stowed amidships.

=== Exercises ===
On 14 to 16 of August 2012, the Naval Forces Northern Luzon (NFNL) conducted a small-scale Naval Exercise code-named SAGEX 02–12 at the waters of South China Sea. BRP Liberato Picar together with BRP Gregorio del Pilar and BRP Rajah Humabon participated under Naval Task Force (NTF) 11. The exercise includes patrol, simulated tracking of targets and interdiction and capped by live firing exercises.

== Photos ==
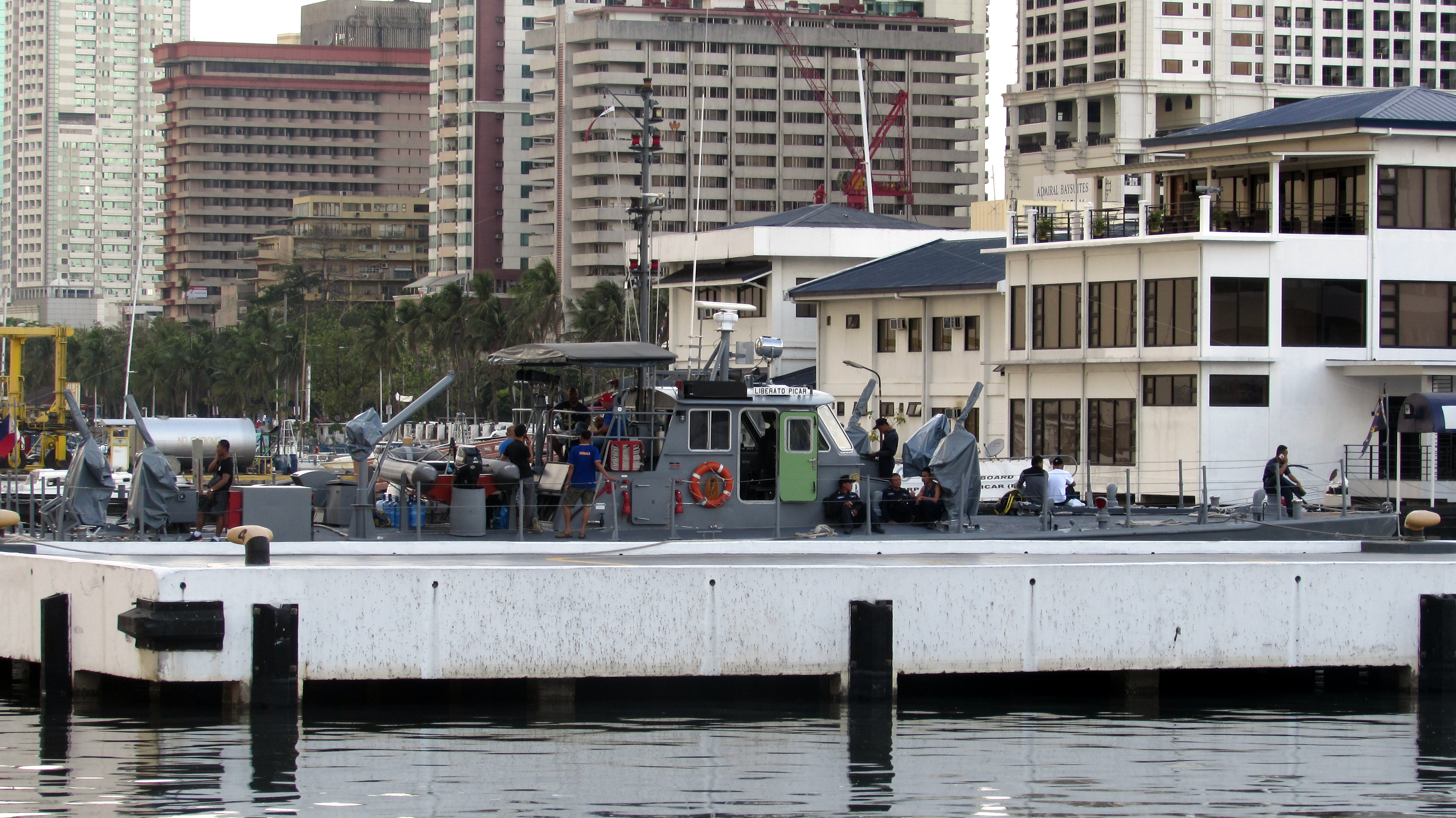
BRP Liberato Picar at Naval Station Andrada

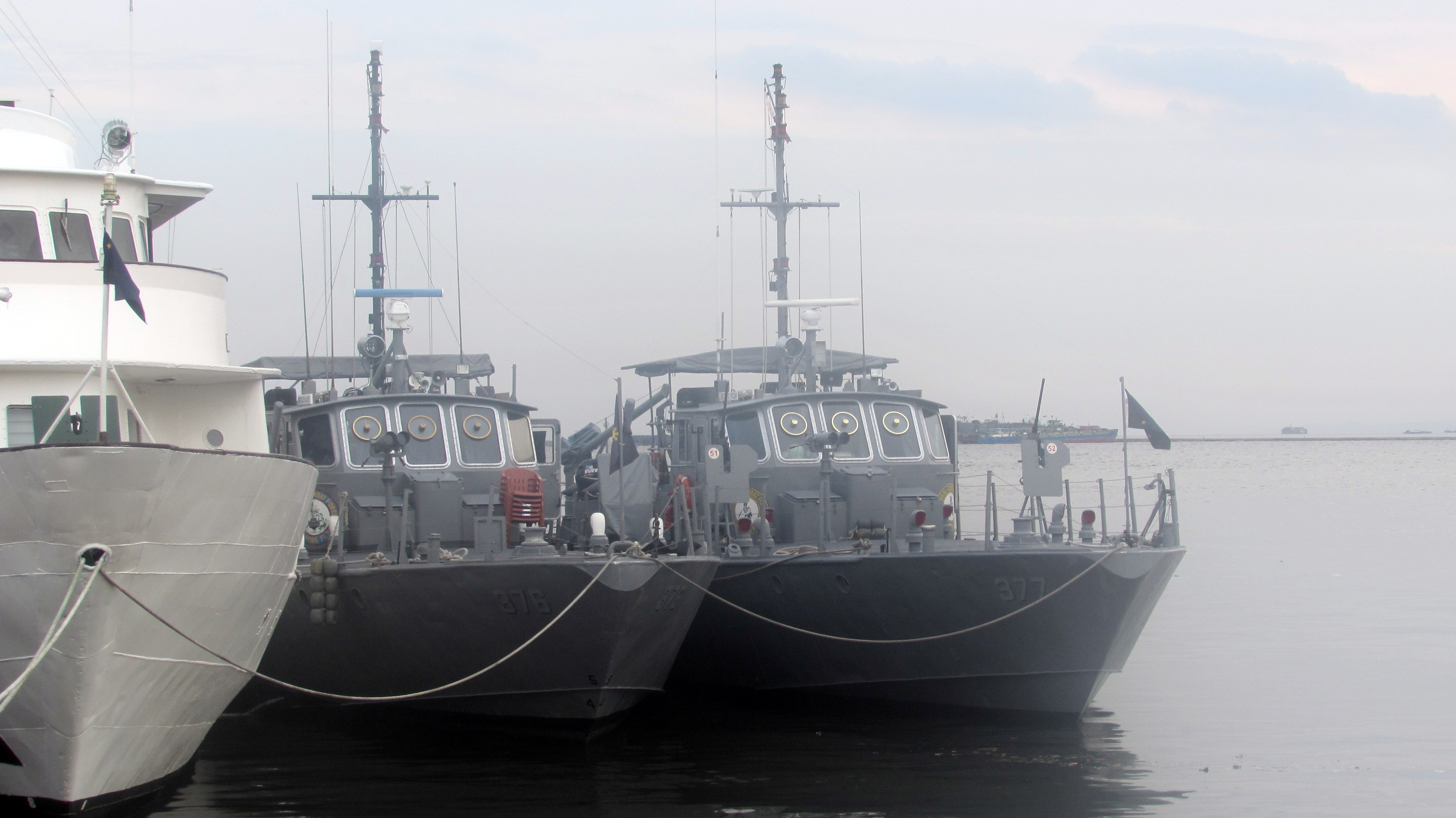
BRP Liberato Picar and BRP Heracleo Alano at Pier 13
