= BRP Carlos Albert =

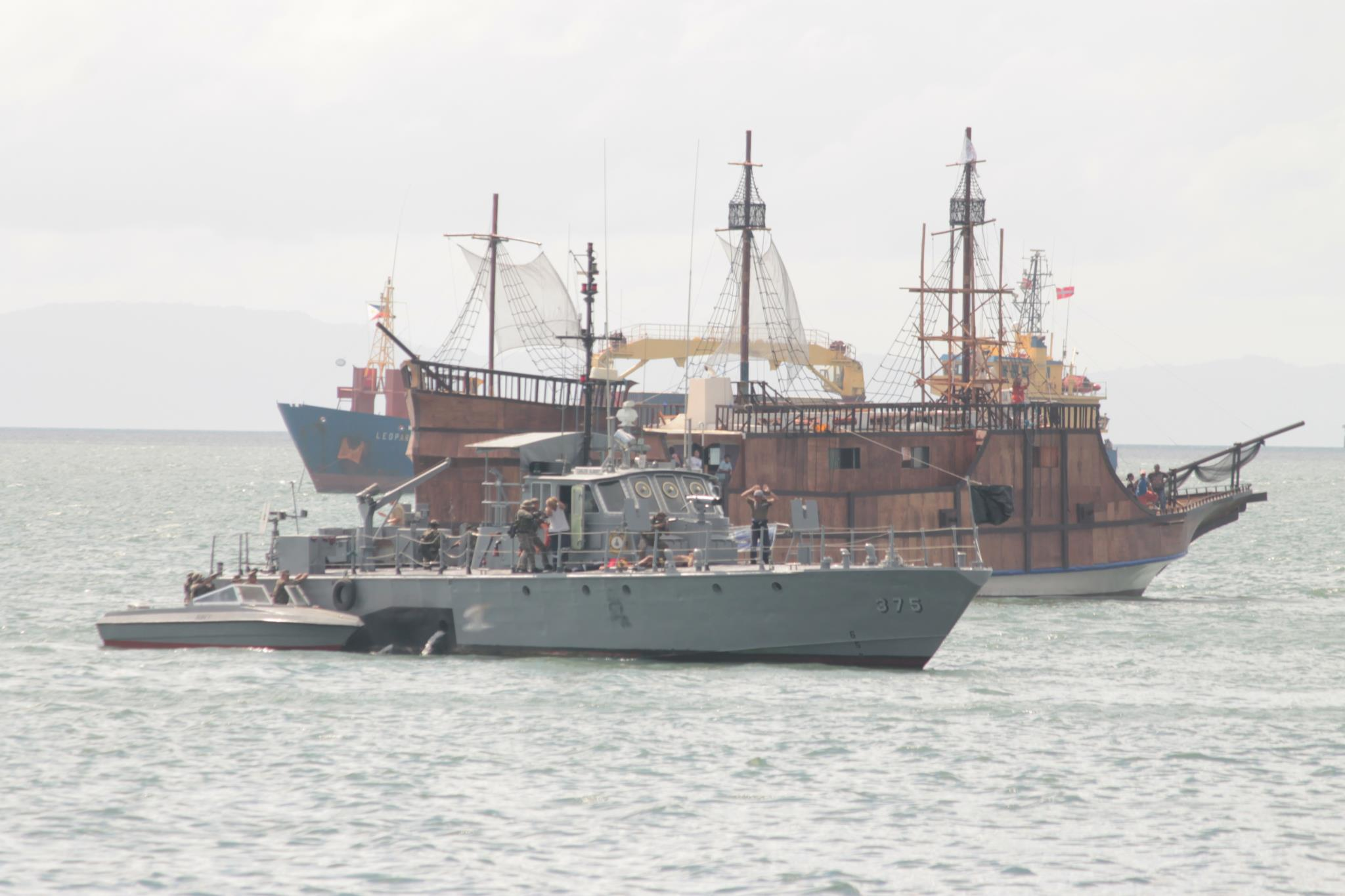

History

Philippines
- Name: Carlos Albert
- Namesake: Capt. Carlos Albert was an officer of the Offshore Patrol. Graduated from the USNA class of 1939
- Operator: Philippine Navy
- Ordered: April 1990
- Builder: Trinity-Equitable Shipyards, New Orleans, USA
- Acquired: 26 April 1991
- Commissioned: January 1992
- Reclassified: PC-375 as of April 2016
- Status: in active service

General characteristics
- Class & type: Jose Andrada-class coastal patrol craft
- Displacement: 56.4 tons full load
- Length: 78 ft (24 m)
- Beam: 20 ft (6.1 m)
- Draft: 5.8 ft (1.8 m)
- Propulsion: 2 × 1,400 bhp Detroit 16V-92TA diesel engines (Note: All sources refer to the same engine, although with different horsepower rating. But official specs from manufacturer indicates a 1,400 hp rating for each engine.); 2 × 35 kW diesel generators; 2 shafts
- Speed: 28 knots (52 km/h) maximum
- Range: 1,200 nmi (2,200 km) at 12 knots (22 km/h)
- Boats & landing craft carried: 4-meter rigid inflatable boat at aft
- Complement: 12
- Sensors & processing systems: Raytheon AN/SPS-64(V)11 navigation / surface search radar
- Armament: 4 × Mk.26 M2HB Browning 12.7 mm/50 cal. GP machine guns; 2 × M60 7.62 mm/30 cal. GP machine guns

BRP Carlos Albert (PC-375) is the fifth ship of the Jose Andrada-class coastal patrol boats of the Philippine Navy. It is part of the first batch of its class ordered through US Foreign Military Sales (FMS) in 1990, and was commissioned with the Philippine Navy in January 1992. It was initially designated as Fast Patrol Craft, and was numbered "DF-375", but later on was re-designated as a Patrol Gunboat, and was re-numbered as "PG-375", until another round of reclassification changed its designation as a Patrol Craft with hull number "PC-375" from April 2016.

== Notable operations / exercises ==
In May 2009, the Carlos Albert, together with other Philippine Navy ships BRP Dagupan City, BRP Bienvenido Salting and other Philippine Navy units, joined their United States Navy counterparts including USS Harpers Ferry, USS Chafee, USS John S. McCain, USNS Safeguard in the CARAT 2009 naval exercises

In May 2018, the BRP Carlos Albert intercepted and seized two Malaysian-registered fishing vessels together with its crew of 20 Vietnamese personnel carrying over 50 endangered species of sharks and rays off the coast of the Mangsee Islands.

In October 2018, the ship was conducting regular patrols when it spotted and intercepted the Andrea 3 off the coast of El Nido, Palawan at around 12:35 pm at eight nautical miles (15 km; 9.2 mi) or within the Exclusion Zone of the Malampaya Natural Gas Platform. The crew of the Andrea 3 were also later found to be using compressor diving for fishing which is illegal. They and the Andrea 3 were brought to the Liminangcong Pier in Taytay, Palawan and turned over to the custody of the Bureau of Fisheries and Aquatic Resources (BFAR).

== Technical details ==
The ship was built to US Coast Guard standards with aluminum hull and superstructure. She is powered by two Detroit Diesel 16V-92TA Diesel Engines with a combined power of around 2,800 hp driving two propellers for a maximum speed of 28 knots (52 km/h). Maximum range is 1,200 nmi (2,200 km) at 12 knots (22 km/h), or alternatively 600 nmi (1,100 km) at 24 knots (44 km/h).

The ship originally designed to carry one bow Mk.3 40 mm gun, one 81 mm mortar aft, and four 12.7 mm/50 caliber machine guns. Instead, she is armed with only four M2HB Browning 12.7 mm/50 caliber machine guns on Mk.26 mounts, with two positioned forward and two aft; and two M60 7.62 mm/30 caliber machine guns, both mounted amidships. The ship can carry 4,000 rounds of 12.7 mm and 2,000 rounds of 7.62 mm A large "Big Eyes" binocular is also carried on tripod mounts, one on the forecastle and one just above the mast.

As part of the first batch (PG-370 to PG-378), it is not equipped with Mk.38 Mod.0 Bushmaster 25mm chain gun. (Note: Sources vary on weapons mount of this ship, with most indicating the presence of a Bushmaster 25mm chain gun on a Mk.38 mount. Recent photos does not show said weapon or mount, so are other ships from the first batch (PG-370 to PG-378)) It was planned to install either a stabilized or unstabilized M242 25 mm Bushmaster chain gun on her bow after some minor modifications, but as of to date has not materialized.

She is equipped with a Raytheon AN/SPS-64(V)11 surface search and navigation radar but with a smaller antenna as those used in bigger Philippine Navy ships.

A 4-meter rigid inflatable boat powered by a 40-hp outboard motor is stowed amidships.
