= BRP Alfredo Peckson =

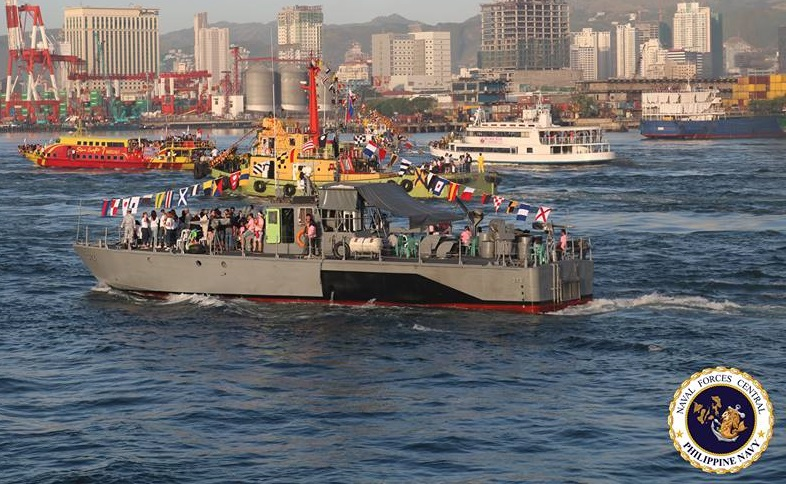
- BRP Alfredo Peckson (PC-372)

History

Philippines
- Name: Alfredo Peckson
- Namesake: Lt. Alfredo Peckson is an officer of the Offshore Patrol.
- Operator: Philippine Navy
- Ordered: August 1989
- Builder: Trinity-Equitable Shipyards, New Orleans, USA
- Acquired: 26 April 1991
- Commissioned: 24 June 1991
- Reclassified: PC-372 as of April 2016
- Status: in active service

General characteristics
- Class & type: Jose Andrada-class coastal patrol craft
- Displacement: 56.4 tons full load
- Length: 78 ft (24 m)
- Beam: 20 ft (6.1 m)
- Draft: 5.8 ft (1.8 m)
- Propulsion: 2 × 1,400 bhp Detroit 16V-92TA eiesel engines (Note: All sources refer to the same engine, although with different horsepower rating. But official specs from manufacturer indicates a 1,400 hp rating for each engine.); 2 × 35 kW diesel generators; 2 shafts
- Speed: 28 knots (52 km/h) maximum
- Range: 1,200 nmi (2,200 km) at 12 knots (22 km/h)
- Boats & landing craft carried: 4-meter rigid inflatable boat at aft
- Complement: 12
- Sensors & processing systems: Raytheon AN/SPS-64(V)11 navigation / surface search radar
- Armament: 4 × Mk.26 M2HB Browning 12.7 mm/50 cal. GP machine guns; 2 × M60 7.62 mm/30 cal. GP machine guns

BRP Alfredo Peckson (PC-372) is the third ship of the Jose Andrada-class coastal patrol boats of the Philippine Navy. It is part of the first batch of its class ordered through US Foreign Military Sales (FMS) in 1989, and was commissioned with the Philippine Navy on 24 June 1991. It was initially designated as Fast Patrol Craft, and was numbered "DF-372", but later on was re-designated as a Patrol Gunboat, and was re-numbered as "PG-372", until another round of reclassification changed its designation as a Patrol Craft with hull number "PC-372" from April 2016.

== Notable operations / exercises ==
The Alfredo Peckson transported a total of 130 civilians stranded due to rough sea conditions in two towns in Aurora province on 6 November 2010.

In January 2019, the ship rescued the 126 passengers and crew of MV Melrivic 2 off the coast of Camotes Island. The Melrivic 2, which was also carrying 16 vehicles, was traveling from Isabel, Leyte to Danao, Cebu when its engine failed and started taking on water. The BRP Alfredo Peckson took on aboard all the passengers and crew and brought them safely to Lapu-Lapu City.

== Technical details ==
The ship was built to US Coast Guard standards with aluminum hull and superstructure. She is powered by two Detroit Diesel 16V-92TA Diesel Engines with a combined power of around 2,800 hp driving two propellers for a maximum speed of 28 knots (52 km/h). Maximum range is 1,200 nmi (2,200 km) at 12 knots (22 km/h), or alternatively 600 nmi (1,100 km) at 24 knots (44 km/h).

The ship originally designed to carry one bow Mk.3 40 mm gun, one 81 mm mortar aft, and four 12.7 mm/50 caliber machine guns. Instead, she is armed with only four M2HB Browning 12.7 mm/50 caliber machine guns on Mk.26 mounts, with two positioned forward and two aft; and two M60 7.62 mm/30 caliber machine guns, both mounted amidships. The ship can carry 4,000 rounds of 12.7 mm and 2,000 rounds of 7.62 mm A large "Big Eyes" binocular is also carried on tripod mounts, one on the forecastle and one just above the mast.

As part of the first batch (PG-370 to PG-378), it is not equipped with Mk.38 Mod.0 Bushmaster 25mm chain gun. (Note: Sources vary on weapons mount of this ship, with most indicating the presence of a Bushmaster 25mm chain gun on a Mk.38 mount. Recent photos does not show said weapon or mount, so are other ships from the first batch (PG-370 to PG-378)) It was planned to install either a stabilized or unstabilized M242 25 mm Bushmaster chain gun on her bow after some minor modifications, but as of to date has not materialized.

She is equipped with a Raytheon AN/SPS-64(V)11 surface search and navigation radar but with a smaller antenna as those used in bigger Philippine Navy ships.

A 4-meter rigid inflatable boat powered by a 40-hp outboard motor is stowed amidships.
