= BRP Hilario Ruiz =

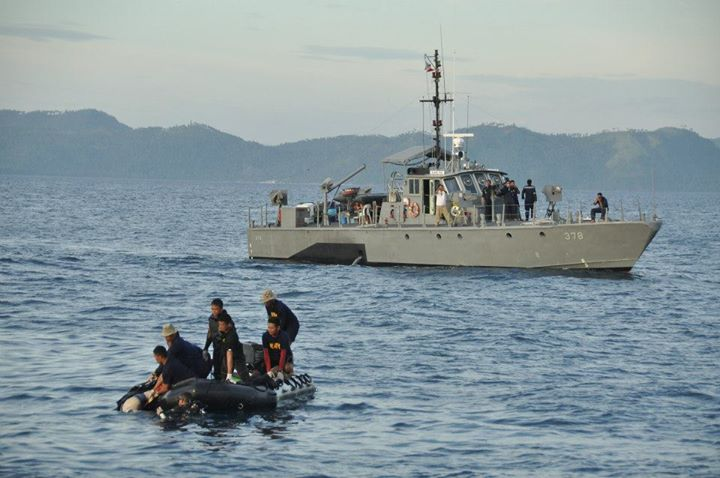
- BRP Hilario Ruiz (PC-378)

History

Philippines
- Name: Hilario Ruiz
- Operator: Philippine Navy
- Ordered: 1990
- Builder: Trinity-Equitable Shipyards, New Orleans, USA
- Acquired: 6 November 1991
- Commissioned: 1 June 1995
- Reclassified: April 2016: from PG-378 to PC-378
- Status: in active service

General characteristics
- Class & type: Jose Andrada class
- Type: Coastal Patrol Craft
- Displacement: 56.4 tons full load
- Length: 78 ft (24 m)
- Beam: 20 ft (6.1 m)
- Draft: 5.8 ft (1.8 m)
- Propulsion: 2 × 1,400 bhp Detroit 16V-92TA Diesel Engines (Note: All sources refer to the same engine, although with different horsepower rating. But official specs from manufacturer indicates a 1,400 hp rating for each engine.); 2 × 35-kW Diesel generators; 2 shafts
- Speed: 28 knots (52 km/h) maximum
- Range: 1,200 nmi (2,200 km) at 12 knots (22 km/h)
- Boats & landing craft carried: 4-meter rigid inflatable boat at aft
- Complement: 12
- Sensors & processing systems: Raytheon AN/SPS-64(V)11 Navigation / Surface Search Radar
- Armament: 4 × Mk.26 M2HB Browning 12.7 mm/50-cal. GP machine guns; 2 × M60 7.62 mm/30-cal. GP machine guns

The BRP Hilario Ruiz (PC-378) is the eighth ship of the Jose Andrada class coastal patrol boats of the Philippine Navy. It is part of the first batch of its class ordered through US Foreign Military Sales (FMS) in 1990, and was commissioned with the Philippine Navy on 1 June 1995. It was initially designated as Fast Patrol Craft, and was numbered "DF-378", but later on was re-designated as Patrol Gunboat "PG-378". Another round of reclassification was made in April 2016, which redesignated the patrol gunboat as the coastal patrol craft BRP Hilario Ruiz (PC-377).

== Technical Details ==
The ship was built to US Coast Guard standards with aluminum hull and superstructure. She is powered by two Detroit Diesel 16V-92TA Diesel Engines with a combined power of around 2,800 hp driving two propellers for a maximum speed of 28 knots (52 km/h). Maximum range is 1,200 nmi (2,200 km) at 12 knots (22 km/h), or alternatively 600 nmi (1,100 km) at 24 knots (44 km/h).

The ship originally designed to carry one bow Mk.3 40 mm gun, one 81 mm mortar aft, and four 12.7 mm/50 caliber machine guns. Instead, she is armed with only four M2HB Browning 12.7 mm/50 caliber machine guns on Mk.26 mounts, with two positioned forward and two aft; and two M60 7.62 mm/30 caliber machine guns, both mounted amidships. The ship can carry 4,000 rounds of 12.7 mm and 2,000 rounds of 7.62 mm A large "Big Eyes" binocular is also carried on tripod mounts, one on the forecastle and one just above the mast.

As part of the first batch (PG-370 to PG-378), it is not equipped with Mk.38 Mod.0 M242 Bushmaster 25mm chain gun that her other sister ships carry. (Note: Sources vary on weapons mount of this ship, with most indicating the presence of a Bushmaster 25mm chain gun on a Mk.38 mount. Recent photos does not show said weapon or mount, so are other ships from the first batch (PG-370 to PG-378)) It was planned to install either a stabilized or unstabilized M242 25 mm Bushmaster chain gun on her bow after some minor modifications, but as of to date has not materialized.

She is equipped with a Raytheon AN/SPS-64(V)11 surface search and navigation radar but with a smaller antenna as those used in bigger Philippine Navy ships. In February 2009, she was installed with the Philippine Navy Vessel Tracking System (VTS) by the Naval Sea Systems Command, and was tested by the Naval Communications Electronics and Information Systems Center (NCEISC) of the Philippine Navy.

A 4-meter rigid inflatable boat powered by a 40-hp outboard motor is stowed amidships.
