= HMAS Ararat =

Two ships of the Royal Australian Navy (RAN) have been named HMAS Ararat, for the town of Ararat, Victoria.

- HMAS Ararat (K34), a Bathurst-class corvette launched in 1943 and scrapped in 1961
- HMAS Ararat (ACPB 89), an Armidale-class patrol boat launched in 2006 and active as of 2016

== Battle honours ==
Two battle honours have been awarded to ships named HMAS Ararat:

- Pacific 1943–45
- New Guinea 1943–44
