= HMAS Wollongong =

Three ships of the Royal Australian Navy have been named HMAS Wollongong, after the city of Wollongong, New South Wales

- HMAS Wollongong (J172), a Bathurst-class corvette launched in 1941 and sold to the Royal Netherlands Navy in 1946
- HMAS Wollongong (FCPB 206), a Fremantle-class patrol boat launched in 1981, and decommissioned in 2005
- HMAS Wollongong (ACPB 92), an Armidale-class patrol boat commissioned in 2007, and decommissioned in 2022

== Battle honours ==
Ships named HMAS Wollongong are entitled to carry six battle honours:

- Pacific 1942–45
- Indian Ocean 1942–45
- Sicily 1943
- Mediterranean 1943
- East Indies 1943
- Okinawa 1945
