= BRP Jose Andrada =

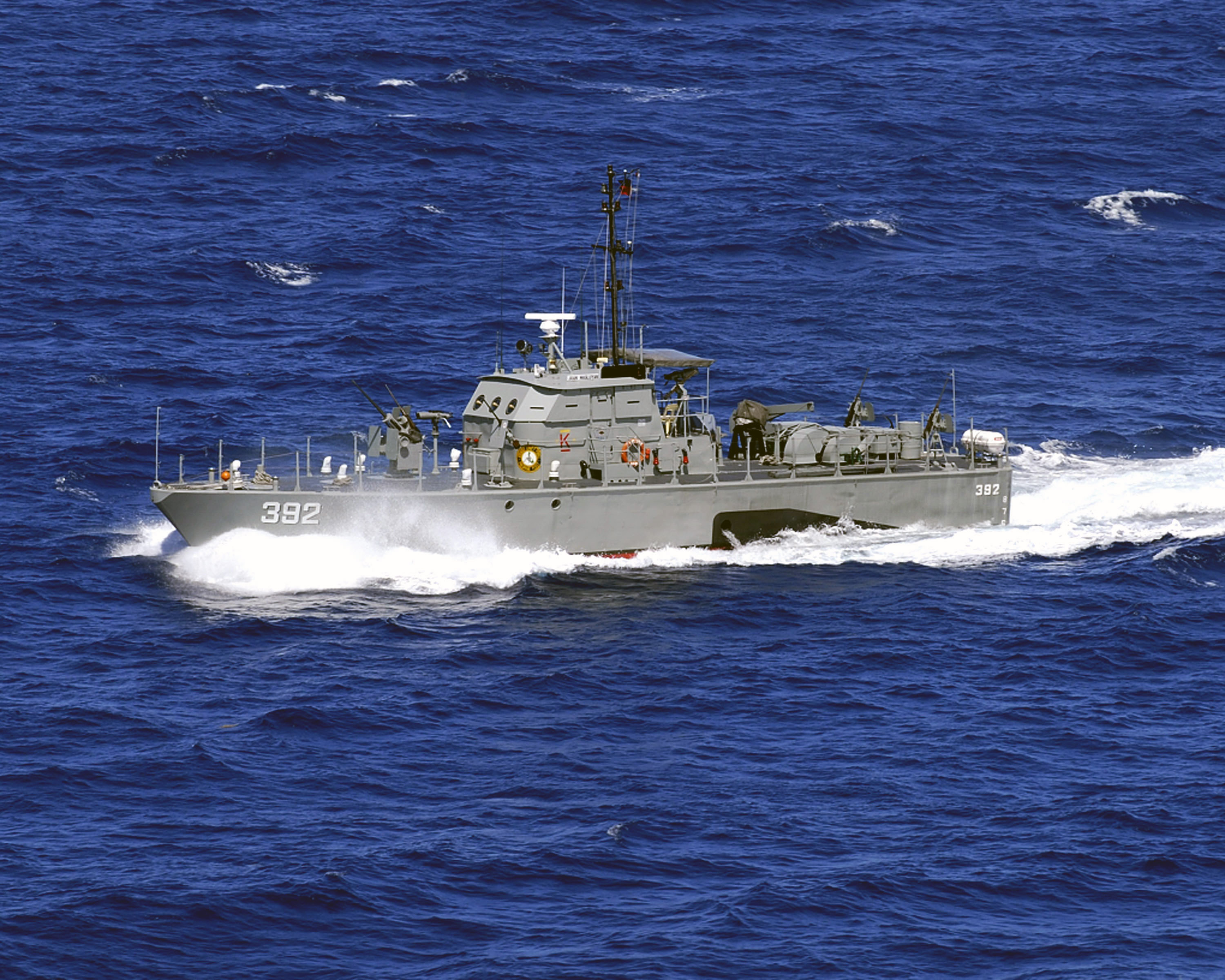
- 20th boat of Jose Andrada-class the BRP Juan Magluyan (PC-392)

History

Philippines
- Name: BRP Jose Andrada
- Namesake: Jose Andrada is one of the original officers of the Offshore Patrol of the Philippine Commonwealth government
- Operator: Philippine Navy
- Ordered: August 1989
- Builder: Trinity-Equitable Shipyards, New Orleans, USA
- Acquired: 21 August 1990
- Commissioned: August 1990
- Reclassified: April 2016 to PC-370
- Status: in active service

General characteristics
- Class & type: Jose Andrada-class patrol craft
- Displacement: 56.4 tons full load
- Length: 78 ft (24 m)
- Beam: 20 ft (6.1 m)
- Draft: 5.8 ft (1.8 m)
- Propulsion: 2 × 1,400 bhp Detroit 16V-92TA Diesel Engines (Note: All sources refer to the same engine, although with different horsepower rating. But official specs from manufacturer indicates a 1,400 hp rating for each engine.); 2 × 35-kW Diesel generators; 2 shafts
- Speed: 28 knots (52 km/h) maximum
- Range: 1,200 nmi (2,200 km) at 12 knots (22 km/h)
- Boats & landing craft carried: 4-meter rigid inflatable boat amidships
- Complement: 12
- Sensors & processing systems: Raytheon AN/SPS-64(V)11 Navigation / Surface Search Radar
- Armament: 4 × Mk.26 M2HB Browning 12.7 mm/50 cal. GP machine guns; 2 × M60 7.62 mm/30 cal. GP machine guns

BRP Jose Andrada (PC-370) is the lead ship of the Jose Andrada-class coastal patrol boats of the Philippine Navy. It is part of the first batch of its class ordered through U.S. Foreign Military Sales (FMS) in 1989, and was commissioned with the Philippine Navy in August 1990. It was initially designated as Fast Patrol Craft, and was numbered "DF-371", but later on was re-designated as a Patrol Gunboat, and was re-numbered as "PG-371", until another round of reclassification changed its hull number to "PC-370"

== Notable operations / exercises ==
The Jose Andrada was part of a joint U.S.-Philippines search team of a MH-47E Chinook special operations helicopter that crashed in the Bohol Sea off Negros Island on 22 February 2002.

On March 13, 2013, while she was conducting maritime patrol together with BRP General Mariano Alvarez along the seawater off Omapoy Island and Bulo-Bulo Island, all of Sitangkai, Tawi-Tawi, they intercepted 2 watercraft loaded with 35 evacuees.

== Technical details ==
The ship was built to U.S. Coast Guard standards with aluminum hull and superstructure. She is powered by two Detroit Diesel 16V-92TA Diesel Engines with a combined power of around 2,800 hp driving two propellers for a maximum speed of 28 knots (52 km/h). Maximum range is 1,200 nmi (2,200 km) at 12 knots (22 km/h), or alternatively 600 nmi (1,100 km) at 24 knots (44 km/h).

The ship originally designed to carry one bow Mk.3 40 mm gun, one 81 mm mortar aft, and four 12.7 mm/50 caliber machine guns. Instead, she is armed with only four M2HB Browning 12.7 mm/50 caliber machine guns on Mk.26 mounts, with two positioned forward and two aft; and two M60 7.62 mm/30 caliber machine guns, both mounted amidships. The ship can carry 4,000 rounds of 12.7 mm and 2,000 rounds of 7.62 mm. A large "Big Eyes" binocular is also carried on tripod mounts, one on the forecastle and one just above the mast.

As part of the first batch (PG-370 to PG-378), it is not equipped with Mk.38 Mod.0 M242 Bushmaster 25mm chain gun that her other sister ships carry. (Note: Sources vary on weapons mount of this ship, with most indicating the presence of a Bushmaster 25mm chain gun on a Mk.38 mount. Recent photos does not show said weapon or mount, so are other ships from the first batch (PG-370 to PG-378)) It was planned to install either a stabilized or unstabilized M242 25 mm Bushmaster chain gun on her bow after some minor modifications, but as of date has not materialized.

She is equipped with a Raytheon AN/SPS-64(V)11 surface search and navigation radar but with a smaller antenna as those used in bigger Philippine Navy ships.

A 4-meter rigid inflatable boat powered by a 40-hp outboard motor is stowed amidships.
