= Detroit Diesel Series 92 =

Series 92
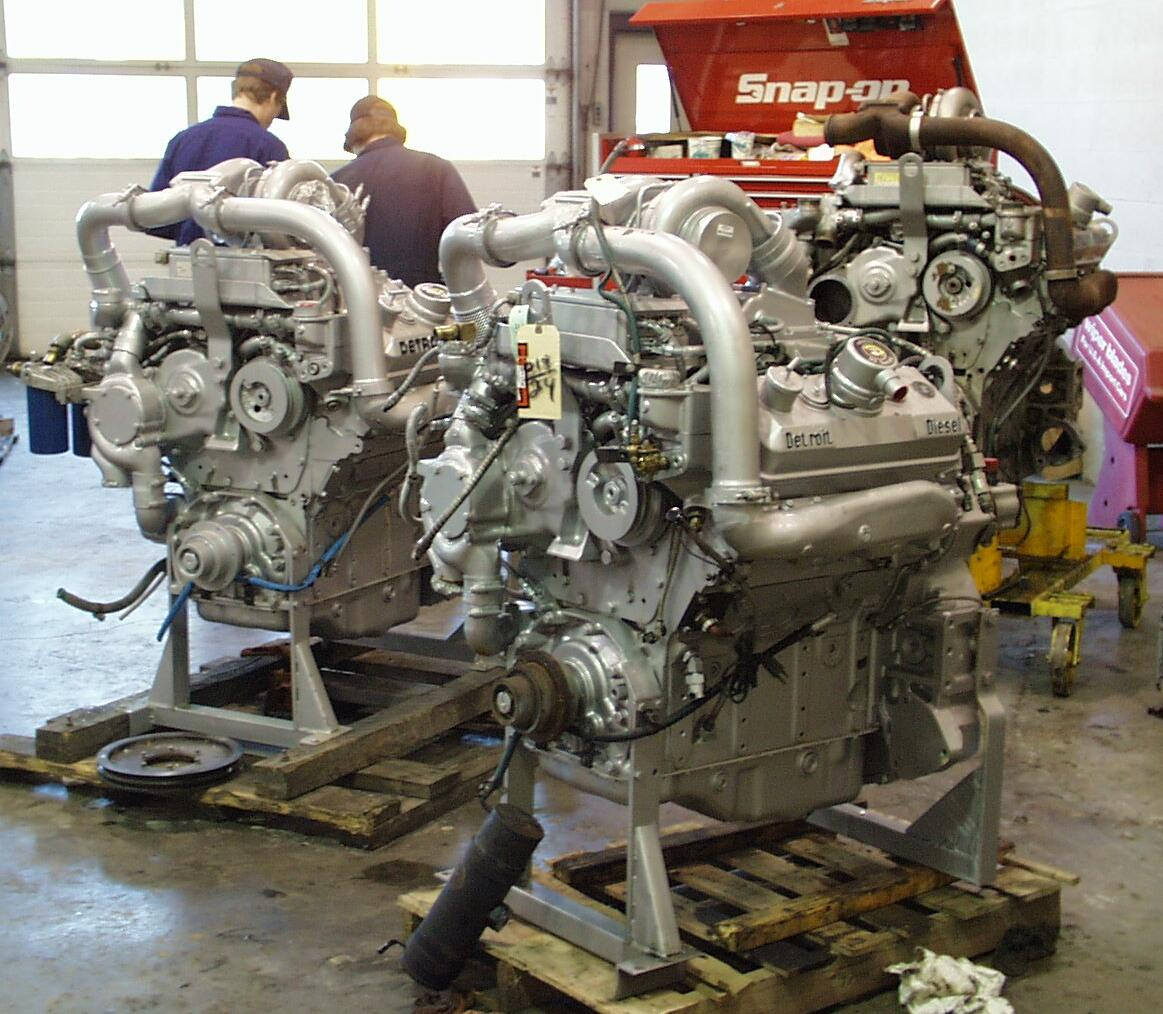
- 6V92 engines photographed in 2003

Overview
- Manufacturer: Detroit Diesel
- Production: 1974–1995

Layout
- Configuration: 6-, 8-, 12-, and 16-cylinder V-type
- Displacement: 552 to 1,472 cu in (9.0 to 24.1 L); 92 in^{3} (1,510 cc) per cylinder
- Cylinder bore: 4.84 in (123 mm)
- Piston stroke: 5.00 in (127 mm)
- Cylinder block material: Cast iron, replaceable cylinder liners
- Cylinder head material: Cast iron
- Valvetrain drive system: Gears
- Compression ratio: 17:1 (turbo); 19:1

RPM range
- Max. engine speed: 1950–2100 rpm (typ.)

Combustion
- Turbocharger: Optional

Dimensions
- Length: 38–41 in (97–104 cm) (6V92); 44–48 in (110–120 cm) (8V92); 68 in (170 cm) (12V92); 79 in (200 cm) (16V92)
- Width: 38–39 in (97–99 cm) (6V92 & 8V92); 47 in (120 cm) (12V92 & 16V92)
- Height: 47–52 in (120–130 cm) (6V92 & 8V92); 54–59 in (140–150 cm) (12V92 & 16V92)
- Dry weight: 1,960–2,020 lb (890–920 kg) (6V92); 2,345–2,415 lb (1,064–1,095 kg) (8V92); 3,840–4,280 lb (1,740–1,940 kg) (12V92); 4,840 lb (2,200 kg) (16V92)

Chronology
- Predecessor: Series 71
- Successor: Series 60 Series 50

The Detroit Diesel Series 92 is a two-stroke cycle, V-block diesel engine, produced with versions ranging from six to 16 cylinders. Among these, the most popular were the 6V92 and 8V92, which were V6 and V8 configurations of the same engine respectively. The series was introduced in 1974 as a rebored version of its then-popular sister series, the Series 71. Both the Series 71 and Series 92 engines were popularly used in on-highway vehicle applications.

== History ==
The Series 92 engines were introduced in 1974. Compared with the Series 71 engines from which they were derived, the Series 92 featured a larger bore of 4.84025 ± 0.00125 in (122.942 ± 0.032 mm) and an identical stroke of 5 in (130 mm) for a nominal displacement per cylinder of 92 cu in (1,510 cc), from which the Series 92 derives its name.

While the basic mechanics of the 92 series indicated superior performance and durability, early prototypes were challenged by breakdowns resulting from the torque inherent in the design. Carl Kamradt, the senior engineer in Detroit Diesel Allison's E5, or Experimental Department, was responsible for working through the practical applications of the engine, resulting in the 92 Series becoming the favored choice for applications requiring high torque and dependability. Upon Mr. Kamradt's retirement in 1984, the E-5 division was eliminated as the 92 Series ran its course. In the 1980s and early 1990s, the Series 92 was used as a major bus engine in North America. It was also available for several other applications: Trucks, buses, motor homes, construction, fire trucks/apparatus, industrial equipment, several military vehicles, aircraft and marine applications.

The Series 92 left the market in the summer of 1995 and the four stroke Detroit Diesel engine Series 60 was introduced as a replacement.

== Features and specifications ==
- 9.0 litre (V6), 12.1 litre (V8), 18.1 litre (V12) and 24.1 litre (V16)
- Power ratings ranging from 253 to 950 horsepower (189 to 708 kW)
- Supported the DDECI, DDECII, DDECIII and DDECIV.
- Gear

Power output for selected models
Family	Model	Torque	Power
6V92	6V92	737 ft⋅lbf (999 N⋅m) @ 1400 rpm	270 hp (200 kW) @ 2100 rpm
6V92	6V92T	890 ft⋅lbf (1,210 N⋅m) @ 1400 rpm	322 hp (240 kW) @ 2100 rpm
6V92	6V92TA	957 ft⋅lbf (1,298 N⋅m) @ 1300 rpm	335 hp (250 kW) @ 2100 rpm
6V92	6V92TTA	957 ft⋅lbf (1,298 N⋅m) @ 1300 rpm	307 hp (229 kW) @ 1900 rpm
8V92	8V92	983 ft⋅lbf (1,333 N⋅m) @ 1400 rpm	360 hp (270 kW) @ 2100 rpm
8V92	8V92T	1,186 ft⋅lbf (1,608 N⋅m) @ 1400 rpm	430 hp (320 kW) @ 2100 rpm
8V92	8V92TA	1,242 ft⋅lbf (1,684 N⋅m) @ 1400 rpm	435 hp (324 kW) @ 2100 rpm
8V92	8V92TTA	1,242 ft⋅lbf (1,684 N⋅m) @ 1400 rpm	365 hp (272 kW) @ 1950 rpm
12V92 (two joined 6V92 engine blocks)	12V92	1,474 ft⋅lbf (1,998 N⋅m) @ 1300 rpm	550 hp (410 kW) @ 2100 rpm
12V92 (two joined 6V92 engine blocks)	12V92TA	1,845–2,040 ft⋅lbf (2,501–2,766 N⋅m) @ 1200 rpm	625–700 hp (466–522 kW) @ 2100 rpm
16V92 (two joined 8V92 engine blocks)	16V92TA	2,370–2,755 ft⋅lbf (3,213–3,735 N⋅m) @ 1200 rpm	850–960 hp (630–720 kW) @ 2100 rpm

=== Power output specifications (6V92) ===
- 775 ft⋅lbf (1,051 N⋅m) @ 1200 rpm; 253 horsepower governed at 2100 rpm
- 816 ft⋅lbf (1,106 N⋅m) @ 1200 rpm; 277 horsepower governed at 2100 rpm
- 957 ft⋅lbf (1,298 N⋅m) @ 1300 rpm; 300 horsepower governed at 2100 rpm
- 1,020 ft⋅lbf (1,380 N⋅m) @ 1300 rpm; 335 horsepower governed at 2100 rpm

=== Power output specifications (8V92) ===
- 983–1,242 lb⋅ft (1,333–1,684 N⋅m) @ 1400 rpm; 360-435 horsepower governed at 1965-2100 rpm

== Model number ==
The model number indicates the basic configuration of the engine. The model designator consists of the number of cylinders (6, 8, 12, or 16), the block layout (V), engine series (92), and a lettered suffix which provides information about forced induction (T for turbocharged, A for aftercooled), so for instance, an 8V92TA designates a Series 92 V8 engine that is turbocharged and aftercooled.

8	08	3	-	7	0	00
Model designator	Number of cylinders	Application designation		Basic engine arrangement and drive shaft rotation	Design variation	Specific model number
8 = Series 92, vee arrangement		2 = Marine		3 = LC (left hand rotation, (Note: As viewed from the front of the engine) starter on right bank)	0 = 4 valve head	
		3 = Industrial F-F (Note: "Fan to Flywheel")		4 = LD (left hand rotation, starter on left bank)	3 = Turbocharged without aftercooling	
		5 = Generator		7 = RC (right hand rotation, starter on right bank)	4 = Turbocharged and aftercooled	
		7 = Vehicle F-F		8 = RD (right hand rotation, starter on left bank)	5 = Customer special engine	
		8 = Vehicle F-F			7 = Constant horsepower (TT)	
					8 = Constant horsepower (TTA, California & Federal Certified)	

== Detroit Diesel (2 cycle) common model and suffix codes ==
Model codes	
L	Low profile
V	V-block
N	Needle Unit Injectors, four exhaust valves (per cylinder)
T	Turbocharged
TA	Turbocharged Aftercooled (JWAC Jacket Water Aftercooled )
TAC	Turbocharged Aftercooled California Certification (JWAC Jacket Water Aftercooled )
TT	Tailored Torque (Fuel Squeezer)
TTA	Tailored Torque Aftercooled (Fuel Squeezer Plus) (JWAC Jacket Water Aftercooled )
TI	Turbocharged Intercooled
TIB	Turbocharged Intercooled Bypass Blower

== Competing power plants ==
- Detroit Diesel 6-71 (inline)
- Detroit Diesel 8V71
- Caterpillar 3406
- Cummins L10
- International HT530
- Cummins 6CTA8.3
- Detroit Diesel Series 60

== See also ==
- List of Detroit Diesel products
