= List of equipment of the Philippine Navy =

This is a list of equipment used by the Philippine Navy, the branch of the Armed Forces of the Philippines specializing in naval warfare. The service has made use of its existing equipment to fulfill its mandate while modernization projects are underway. Republic Act No. 7898 declares the policy of the State to modernize the military to a level where it can effectively and fully perform its constitutional mandate to uphold the sovereignty and preserve the patrimony of the Republic. The law, as amended, sets conditions that should be satisfied when the defense department procures major equipment and weapon systems for the navy.

For the retired naval ships of the service, see the list of decommissioned ships of the Philippine Navy.

== Frigates ==
=== Miguel Malvar class frigate ===
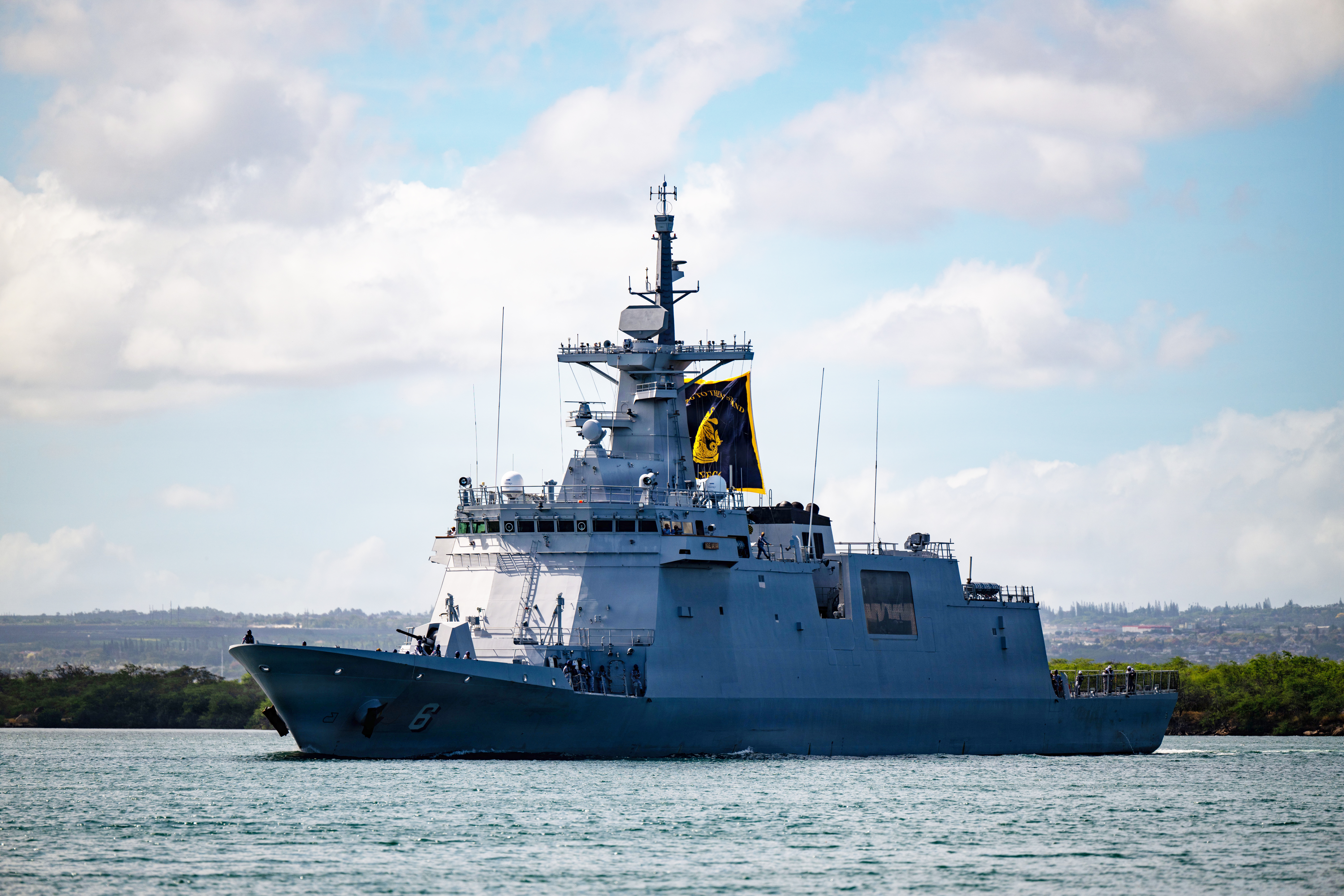
BRP Miguel Malvar FFG-6

Frigates made by South Korea's Hyundai Heavy Industries based on the shipbuilder's HDF-3000 design, acquired under the Horizon 2 phase of the Revised AFP Modernization Program. The first ship BRP Miguel Malvar was sent off to the Philippines on March 31, 2025. The Malvar arrived 4 days ahead of schedule, on April 4, 2025. The arrival ceremony was still held on April 8, as originally planned. Its commissioning ceremony into active duty took place during the 127th anniversary of the Philippine Navy on 20 May 2025. The second ship of the class, BRP Diego Silang was delivered on 9 September 2025. The two ships of the class are the most modern surface combatants of the Philippine Navy acquired to-date. Two additional improved Malvar-Class frigates were ordered with a budget of $585 million.

Origin: South Korea

Size	Performance	Armament	Other features
Displacement: 3,200 tonnes Length: 118.4 meters (388 ft) Complement: TBC	Propulsion: Combined Diesel and Diesel (CODAD) Maximum continuous speed: 25 knots (46 km/h; 29 mph) Range: 4,500 nautical miles (8,300 km; 5,200 mi)	1 × Oto Melara Super Rapid 76mm/62cal gun 1 × 35mm ASELSAN Gokdeniz CIWS 2 × 4 LIGNex1 SSM-710K C-Star anti-ship cruise missile 16 × MBDA VL-MICA vertical launching system (VLS) 2 × triple SEA TLS-TT torpedo launchers for K745 Blue Shark torpedo 4 × S&T Motiv 12.7mm K6 heavy machine guns	Aviation: 1 x AW159 Wildcat Radar: IAI EL/M-2258 ALPHA S-band 3D AESA air/surface search radar, Hensoldt UK SharpEye Mk.11 navigation and surface-search radars (1 x X-band/ 1 x S-band) Sonar: ELAC Sonar Hunter 2.0 low/medium frequency active/passive hull mounted

Name	In service	Hull number	Commissioned	Unit	Notes
Miguel Malvar	2 (+2)	FFG-6	20 May 2025	Offshore Combat Force	
Diego Silang	2 (+2)	FFG-7	2 December 2025	Offshore Combat Force	
TBC	2 (+2)	FFG-8	TBC	Offshore Combat Force	
TBC	2 (+2)	FFG-9	TBC	Offshore Combat Force	

=== Jose Rizal class frigate ===
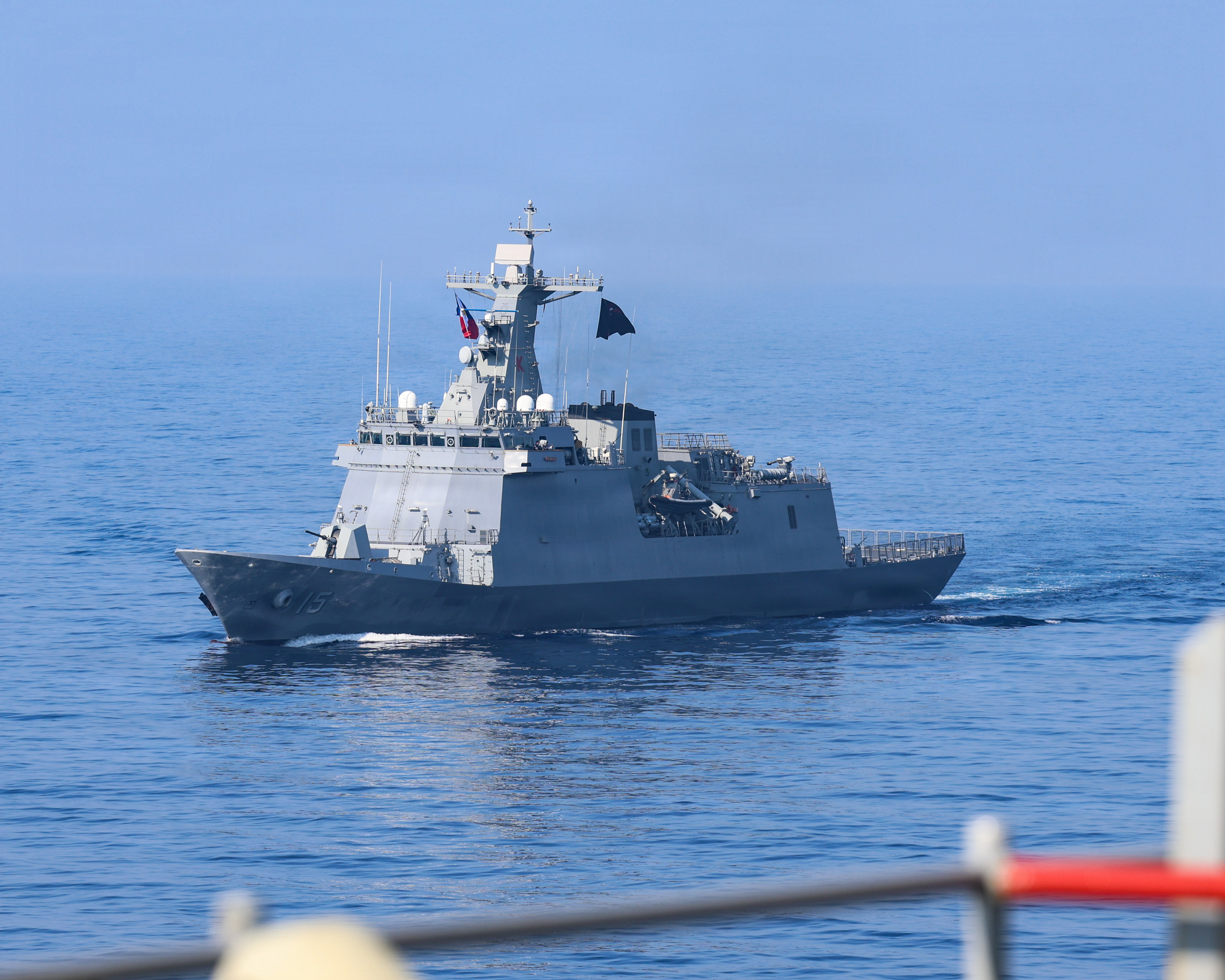
BRP Antonio Luna (FFG 15)

Frigates made by South Korea's Hyundai Heavy Industries based on the shipbuilder's HDF-2600 design, acquired under the Horizon 1 phase of the Revised AFP Modernization Program. The first ship BRP Jose Rizal was delivered in May 2020, and BRP Antonio Luna on March 21, 2021. However, due to budgetary constraints set during initial stages of the acquisition project, the initial two ships of the class come "fitted for but not with" (FFBNW) several subsystems, including a Close-in Weapon System (CIWS), a Vertical Launching System (VLS), and a Towed Array Sonar System (TASS) as well as several electronic subsystems. These systems are planned to be acquired and installed at an unspecified date.

Origin: South Korea

Size	Performance	Armament	Other features
Displacement: 2,600 tonnes Length: 107.5 meters (353 ft) Complement: 65 + attached aircrew and boarding team	Propulsion: Combined Diesel and Diesel (CODAD) Maximum continuous speed: 25 knots (46 km/h; 29 mph) Range: 4,500 nautical miles (8,300 km; 5,200 mi)	1 × Oto Melara Super Rapid 76mm/62cal gun 1 × 30mm ASELSAN SMASH RCWS 2 × 2 LIGNex1 SSM-710K C-Star anti-ship cruise missile on twin canisters 2 × MBDA Simbad-RC twin launchers 2 × triple SEA TLS-TT torpedo launchers for K745 Blue Shark torpedo 4 × S&T Motiv 12.7mm K6 heavy machine guns	Aviation: 1 x AW159 Wildcat Radar: Hensoldt TRS-3D Baseline D 3D air/surface search radar, Kelvin Hughes Sharpeye surface search/navigation radar Sonar: Harris Model 997 medium frequency active/passive hull mounted

Name	In service	Hull number	Commissioned	Unit	Notes
Jose Rizal	2	FFG-14	10 July 2020	Offshore Combat Force	
Antonio Luna	2	FFG-15	19 March 2021	Offshore Combat Force	

== Corvettes ==
=== Conrado Yap class corvette ===
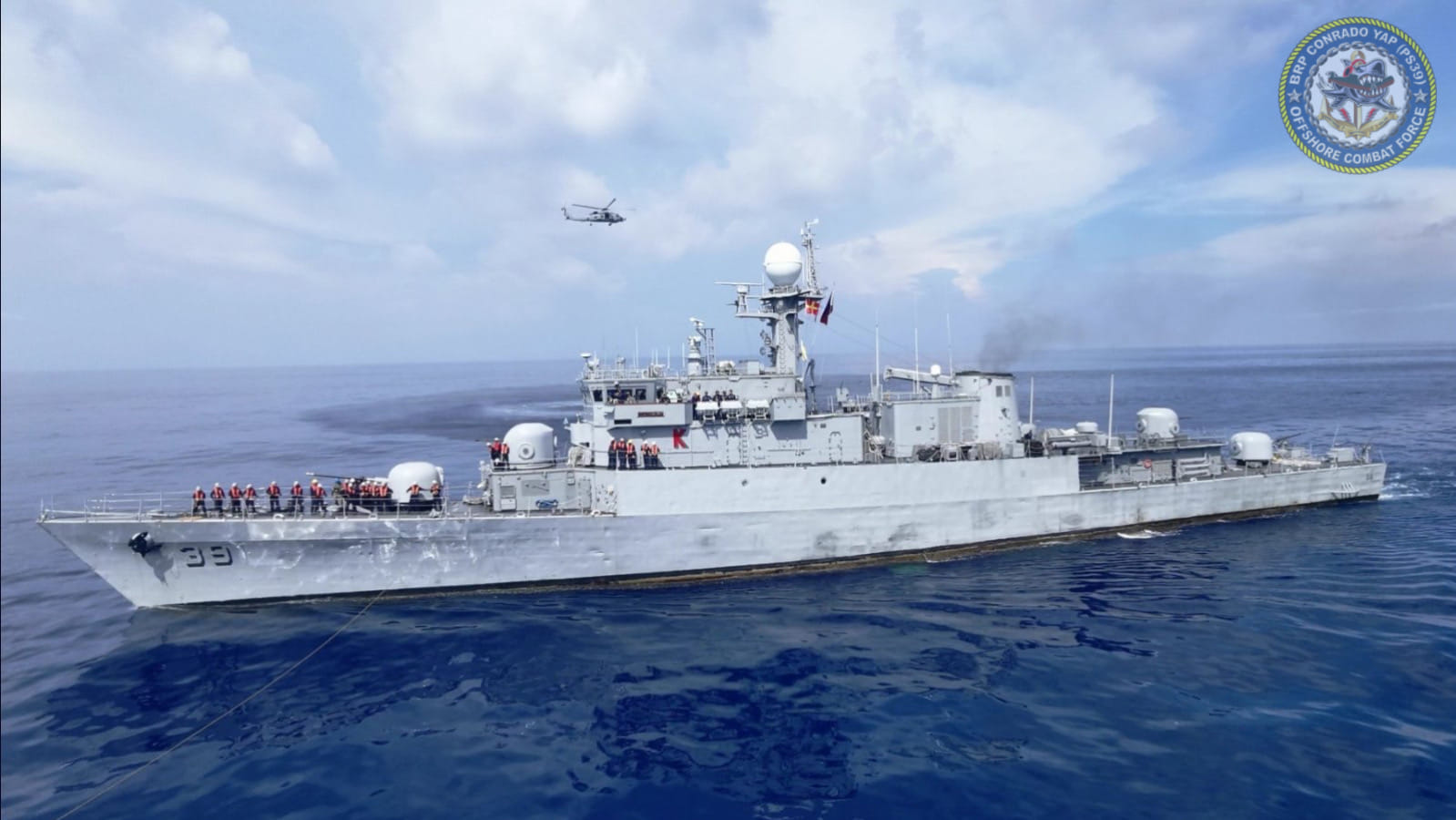
BRP Conrado Yap (PS-30)

Korean-designed general purpose corvettes made originally for the Republic of Korea Navy, which were then transferred to several friendly countries including the Philippines. Designed for coastal defense and anti-submarine operations. Being utilized by the Philippine Navy for anti-submarine warfare (ASW) training. More units are expected to be requested for transfer, as the ROKN retires several more.

Origin: South Korea

Size	Performance	Armament	Other features
Displacement: 1,200 tonnes Length: 88.3 meters (290 ft) Complement: 95	Propulsion: Combined Diesel or Gas (CODOG) Maximum speed: 32 knots (59 km/h; 37 mph) Range: 4,000 nautical miles (7,400 km; 4,600 mi) at 15 knots	2 × Oto Melara Compact 76mm/62 caliber gun 2 × Otobreda Twin 40mm/70 caliber guns 2 × triple Mark 32 torpedo tubes for K745 Blue Shark torpedo 2 × Depth Charge Racks for 12 Mark 9 Depth Charges 6 × Browning M2HB .50 caliber heavy machine guns	Aviation: None Radar: Raytheon AN/SPS-64(V)5B surface search radar Sonar: Raytheon AN/SQS-58 hull mounted

Name	In service	Hull number	Commissioned	Unit	Notes
Conrado Yap	1	PS-30	5 August 2019	Offshore Combat Force	Formerly ROKS Chungju (PCC-762). Previous hull number was PS-39, changed to PS-30 in 2024.

== Offshore Patrol Vessels ==
=== Rajah Sulayman class offshore patrol vessel ===
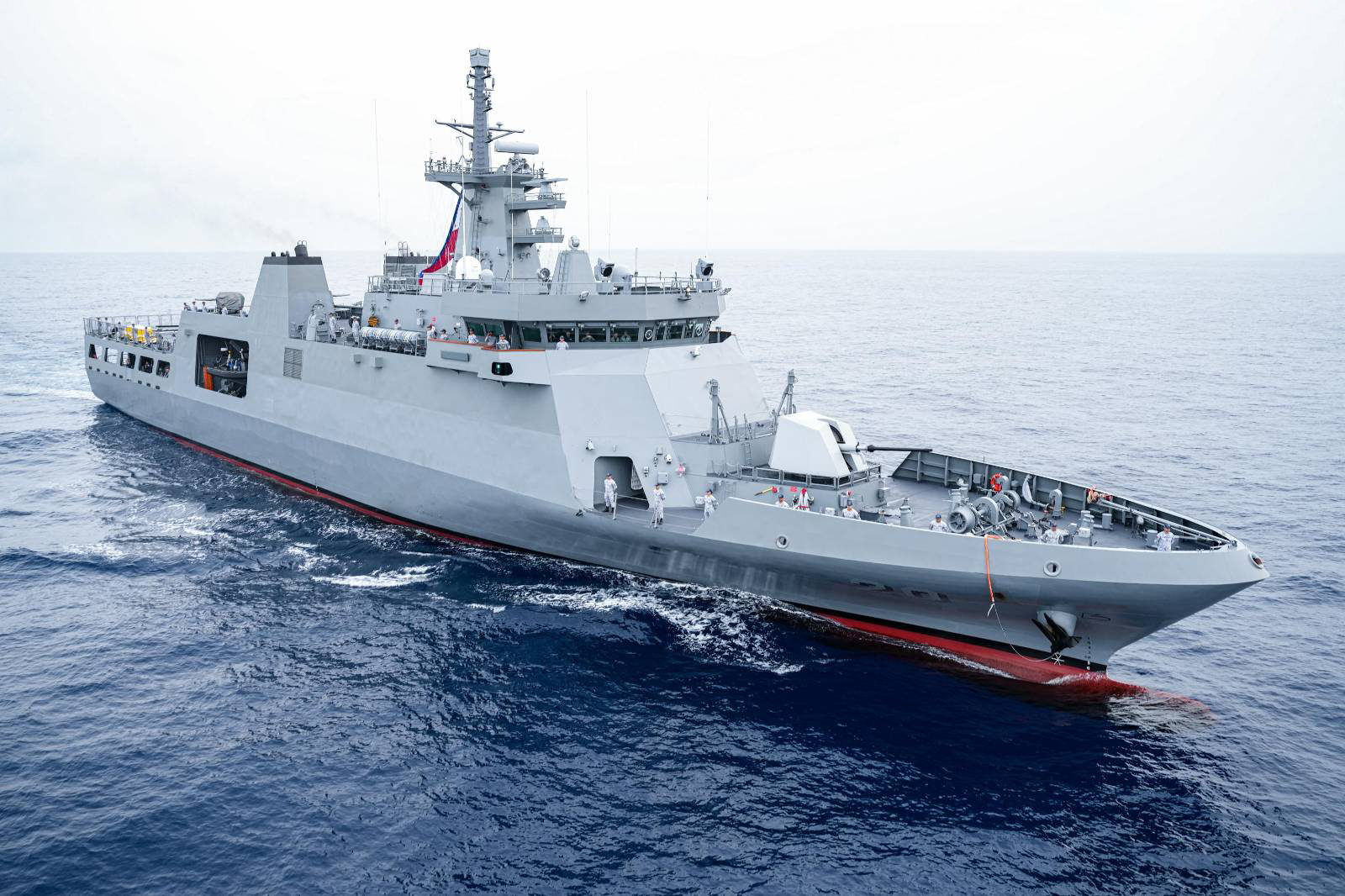
BRP Rajah Sulayman (PS-20)

The Rajah Sulayman-class offshore patrol vessels are six ships designed and built by Hyundai Heavy Industries (HHI) for the Philippine Navy. The Philippine Navy is expecting the delivery of six new offshore patrol vessels acquired under its Offshore Patrol Vessel Acquisition Project under the Revised AFP Modernization Program's Horizon 2 phase, covering the years 2018 to 2022. The Philippines' Department of National Defense (DND) signed a contract with South Korean shipbuilder Hyundai Heavy Industries on 27 June 2022, with the shipbuilder delivering a variant of their HDP-2200+ offshore patrol vessel design.

Origin: South Korea

Size	Performance	Armament	Other features
Displacement: 2,400/2450 tonnes Length: 94.5 meters (309 ft 9 in) Complement: 72	Propulsion: Combined diesel and diesel (CODAD) Maximum speed: 22 knots (41 km/h; 25 mph) at 85% MCR Range: 5,500 nautical miles (10,200 km; 6,300 mi) at 15 knots (28 km/h; 17 mph)	1 × Oto Melara Super Rapid 76/62cal gun 2 × 30mm RCWS Aselsan SMASH 2 × 12.7mm heavy machine guns 2 × Sitep Italia CS-524 it:Multirole Acoustic Stabilized System (MASS) acoustic hailer and laser dazzler 2 × MBDA Simbad-RC twin launchers (Planned)	Aviation: Flight deck for a 10-tonne helicopter or two unmanned aerial vehicles Radar: Leonardo SPS-732 X-brand 2D air/surface surveillance radar Hensoldt UK SharpEye Mk.11 I-band navigation radar Sonar: GeoSpectrum Technologies Towed Reelable Active Passive Sonar (TRAPS) towed-array sonar system; modular mission payload Stern Launching and Recovery System: HLB Ocean Tech, slipway type for 9.5m RHIB.

Name	In service	Hull number	Commissioned	Unit	Notes
Rajah Sulayman	2 (+4)	PS-20	24 February 2026	Offshore Combat Force	Delivered on 17 January 2026.
Rajah Lakandula	2 (+4)	PS-21	9 June 2026	Offshore Combat Force	Delivered on 4 May 2026.
Rajah Humabon	2 (+4)	PS-22	TBC	Offshore Combat Force	
Sultan Kudarat	2 (+4)	PS-23	TBC	Offshore Combat Force	
Datu Marikudo	2 (+4)	PS-24	TBC	Offshore Combat Force	
Datu Sikatuna	2 (+4)	PS-25	TBC	Offshore Combat Force	

=== Del Pilar class offshore patrol vessel ===
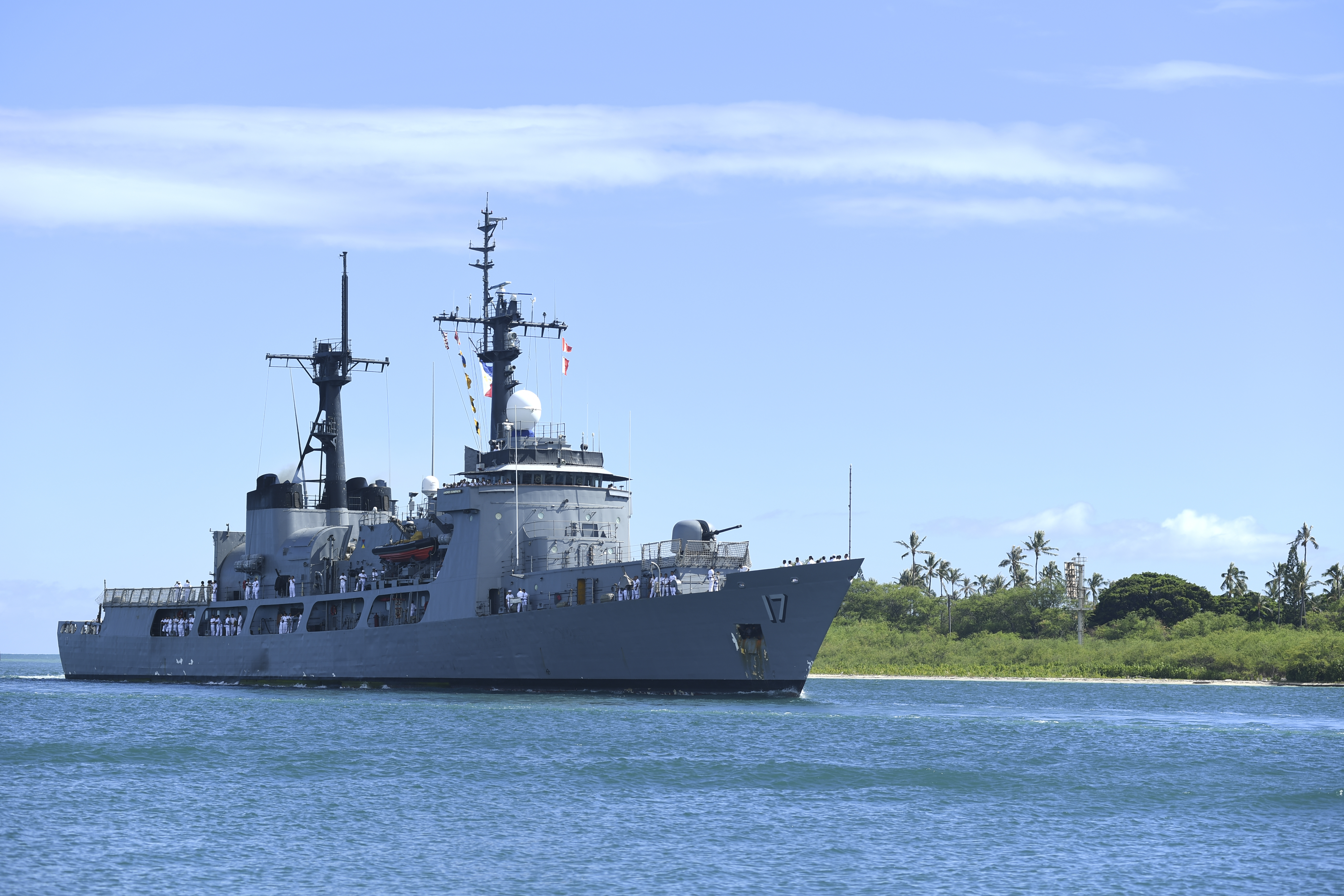

Formerly US Coast Guard cutters of the Hamilton-class, granted to the Philippine Navy as part of US Military Assistance Program. The first ship BRP Gregorio del Pilar was handed over by the US Coast Guard to the Philippine Navy on 13 May 2011, and commissioned on 14 December 2011. The class was used to train the organization on modern warship operations in preparation for newer assets acquired under the navy's modernization program. The class underwent sensor upgrades, with the US government providing SAAB AN/SPS-77 Sea Giraffe AMB 3D air/surface search radars, FLIR Systems SEAFLIR 230 electro-optical/infra-red (EO/IR) system, and BAE Systems Mark 38 Mod.2 25mm gun systems under FMS & FMF programs. A separate upgrade program funded by the Philippine Navy installed a new combat management system, electronic support measures (R-ESM), and hull mounted sonar (HMS).

Origin: United States

Size	Performance	Armament	Other features
Displacement: 3,250 tonnes Length: 115.2 meters (378 ft) Complement: 85 + attached aircrew and boarding team	Propulsion: Combined Diesel or Gas (CODOG) Maximum speed: 29 knots (54 km/h; 33 mph) via gas turbines Range: 12,500 nautical miles (23,200 km; 14,400 mi) at 12kn via diesel	1 × Oto Melara Compact Mark 75 76mm/62 caliber gun 2 × 25mm Mark 38 Mod.2 or Mod.3 Typhoon autocannon system 6 × Browning M2HB .50 caliber heavy machine guns	Aviation: 1 x AW109E Power Radar: Saab AN/SPS-77 Sea Giraffe AMB 3D air/surface search radar, Kelvin Hughes SharpEye X & S-band surface search/navigation radar (on PS-15 & PS-16), Furuno FAR 3220BB X & S-band surface search/navigation radar (on PS-17) Sonar: ELAC Hunter 2.0 hull-mounted

Name	In service	Hull number	Commissioned	Unit	Notes
Gregorio del Pilar	3	PS-40	14 December 2011	Offshore Combat Force	
Ramon Alcaraz	3	PS-41	22 November 2013	Offshore Combat Force	
Andres Bonifacio	3	PS-42	21 July 2016	Offshore Combat Force	

=== Jacinto class offshore patrol vessel ===
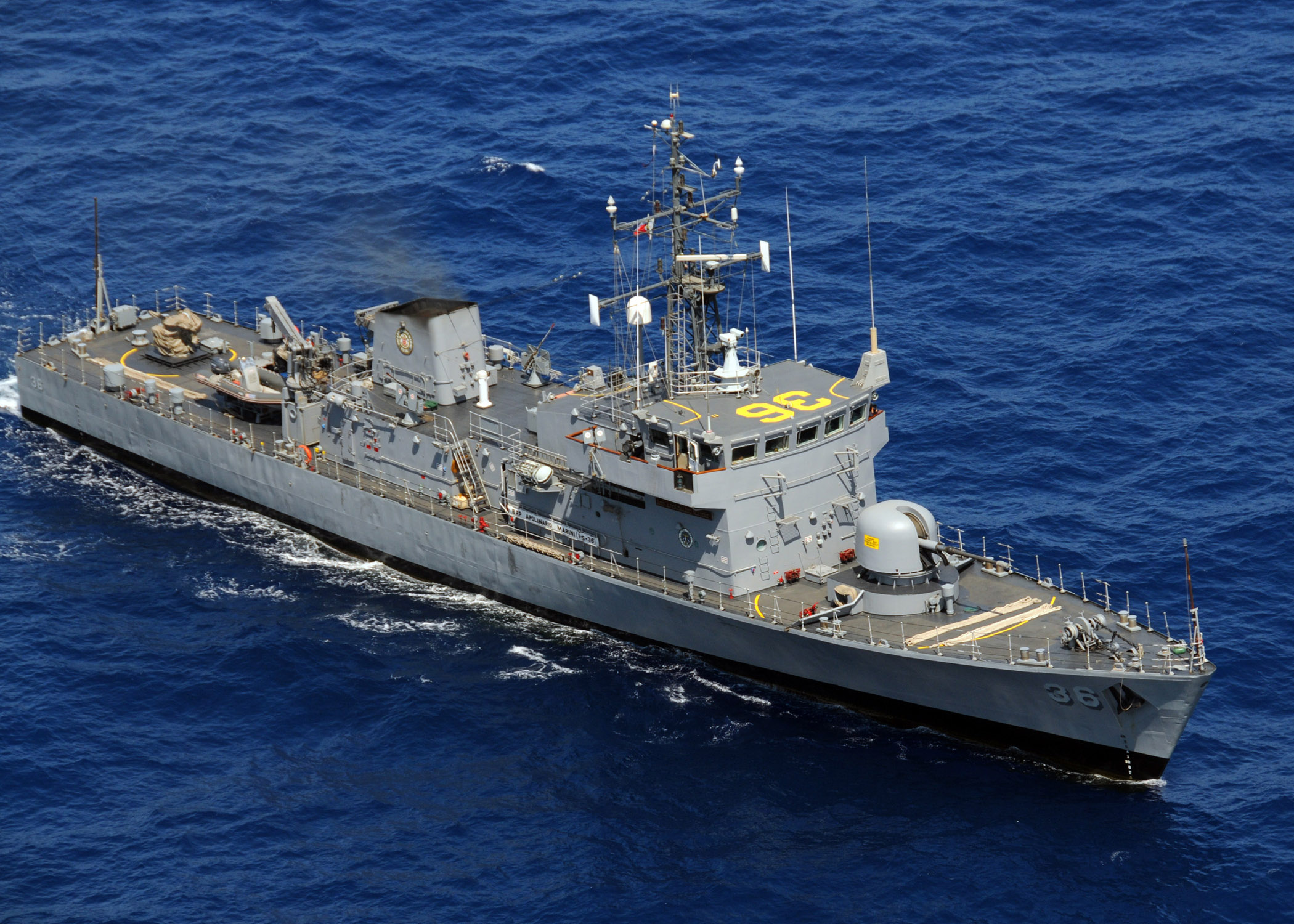
BRP Apolinario Mabini (PS-36)

Former Peacock-class corvettes of the Royal Navy's Hong Kong Squadron until they were sold to the Philippines in 1997 upon the hand-over of Hong Kong to the Chinese government. They were first commissioned between 1983 and 1984, simply designed and are tropicalized for operations in Asia. The ships underwent several phases of upgrades undertaken by the Philippine Navy, with the first one completed in 2005 replacing the old radar and navigation systems. The second upgrade involved improvements on its marine engineering systems, and a third upgrade included the improvement of combat systems.

Origin: United Kingdom

Size	Performance	Armament	Other features
Displacement: 712 tonnes full load Length: 62.6 meters (205 ft) Complement: 31	Propulsion: Diesel Engines Maximum speed: 28 knots (52 km/h; 32 mph); Sustained speed: 25 knots (46 km/h; 29 mph) Range: 2,500 nautical miles (4,600 km; 2,900 mi) at 17 knots	1 × Oto Melara Compact 76mm/62 caliber gun 1 × MSI Defence Seahawk 25mm autocannon system 2 × Mark 16 20mm guns 2 × Browning M2HB .50 caliber heavy machine guns	Aviation: None Radar: GEM Eletronicca Sea Eagle X & S-band surface search/navigation radar (on PS-35), Kelvin Hughes SharpEye X & S-band surface search/navigation radar (on PS-36 & PS-37) Sonar: None

Name	In service	Hull number	Commissioned	Unit	Notes
Emilio Jacinto	3	PS-35	4 August 1997	Offshore Combat Force	
Apolinario Mabini	3	PS-36	4 August 1997	Offshore Combat Force	
Artemio Ricarte	3	PS-37	4 August 1997	Offshore Combat Force	

== Amphibious warfare vessels ==
=== Tarlac-class landing platform dock ===
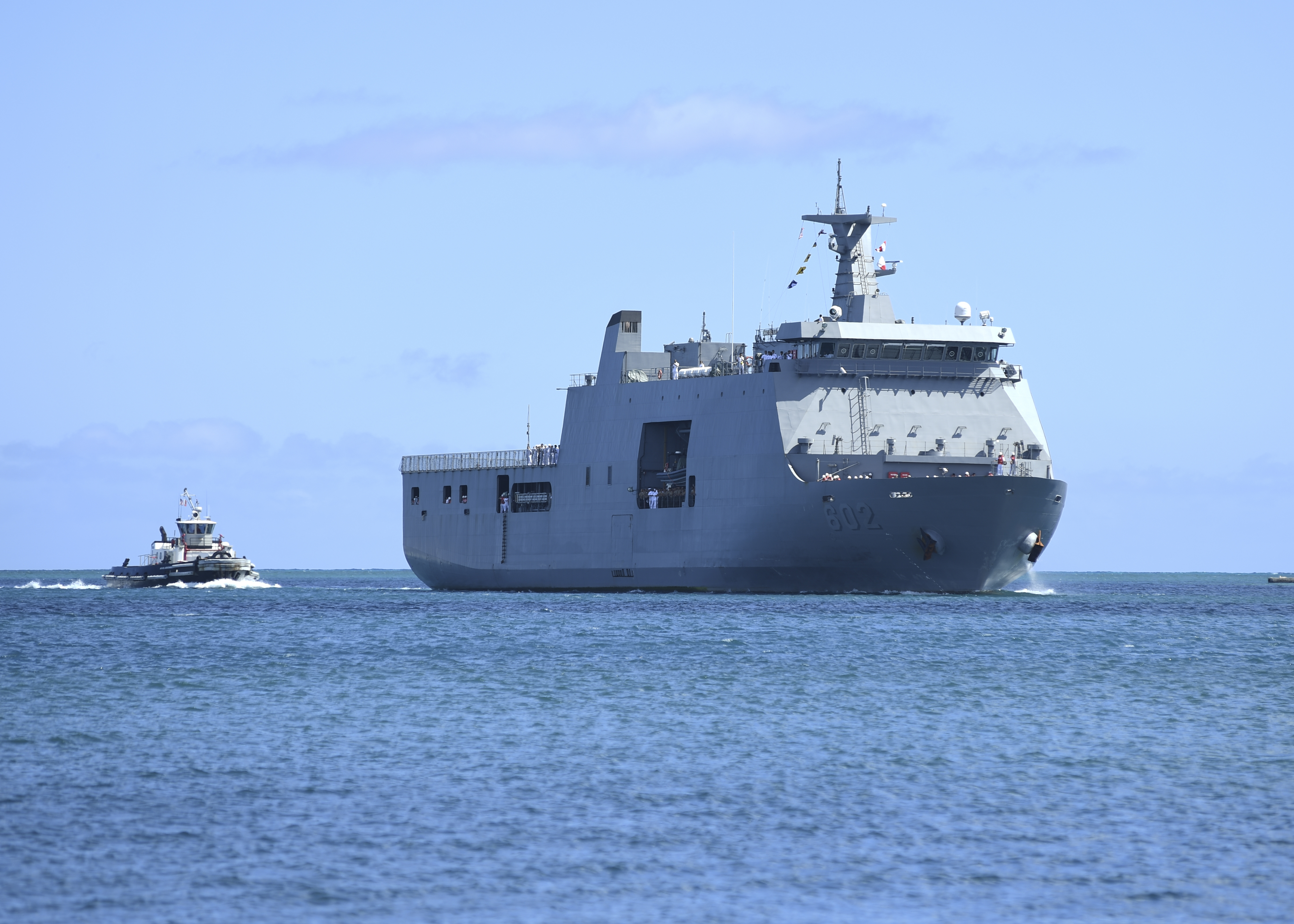
BRP Davao del Sur LD-602

New Indonesian-made landing platform docks, current the Philippine Navy's foremost amphibious warfare platform and its first major brand new ship acquisition since the 1990s. It was acquired under the "Strategic Sealift Vessel" project and was based on the Indonesian Makassar-class landing platform dock. The ships can carry a Philippine Marine Battalion Landing Team (MBLT) with up to 500 fully armed Marines with their vehicles and equipment, and can also carry two small landing craft utilities (LCU). It has a helicopter deck capable of accommodating 2 12-tonne helicopters, as well as a hangar for 1 helicopter. The ships are expected to be installed with additional weapons such as the 76mm guns, the same from the Jose Rizal Class and improved sensor systems. More are now being materialized for acquisition with slightly modified designs under the Philippine Navy's Landing Docks Acquisition Project, which is a Horizon 2 project of the Revised AFP Modernization Program.

Origin: Indonesia

Size	Performance	Armament	Other features
Displacement: 11,583 tonnes full load Length: 123 meters (404 ft) Complement: 121 + attached aircrew 500 Marines	Propulsion: Combined Diesel and Diesel (CODAD) Maximum speed: 16 knots (30 km/h; 18 mph) Range: 9,360 nautical miles (17,330 km; 10,770 mi)	1 × Oto Melara 76mm Super Rapid on foredeck (FFBNW) (Only BRP Ilocos Norte and BRP Leyte is only fitted with a 76mm gun) 1 x gun-based CIWS, either Rheinmetall Oerlikon Millennium (Only BRP Ilocos Norte and BRP Leyte is only fitted with a 1 CIWS) 2 × 30mm Aselsan SMASH secondary guns, one each on port and starboard sides (FFBNW) (Only BRP Ilocos Norte and BRP Leyte is fitted 2 × 30mm gun) 8 × Browning M2HB .50 caliber heavy machine guns	Aviation: 2-spot helicopter deck Boats Carried: 2 × LCU in well deck 2 × RHIB at boat davits Vehicle Deck: 2,800 tonnes of vehicles & cargo inc. 4 × AAVs

Name	In Service	Hull number	Commissioned	Unit	Notes
Tarlac	2 (+2)	LD-601	1 June 2016	Sealift Amphibious Force	
Davao del Sur	2 (+2)	LD-602	31 May 2017	Sealift Amphibious Force	
Laoag City	2 (+2)	LD-603		Sealift Amphibious Force	Under construction
Leyte	2 (+2)	LD-604		Sealift Amphibious Force	Under construction

=== Bacolod City-class logistics support vessel ===
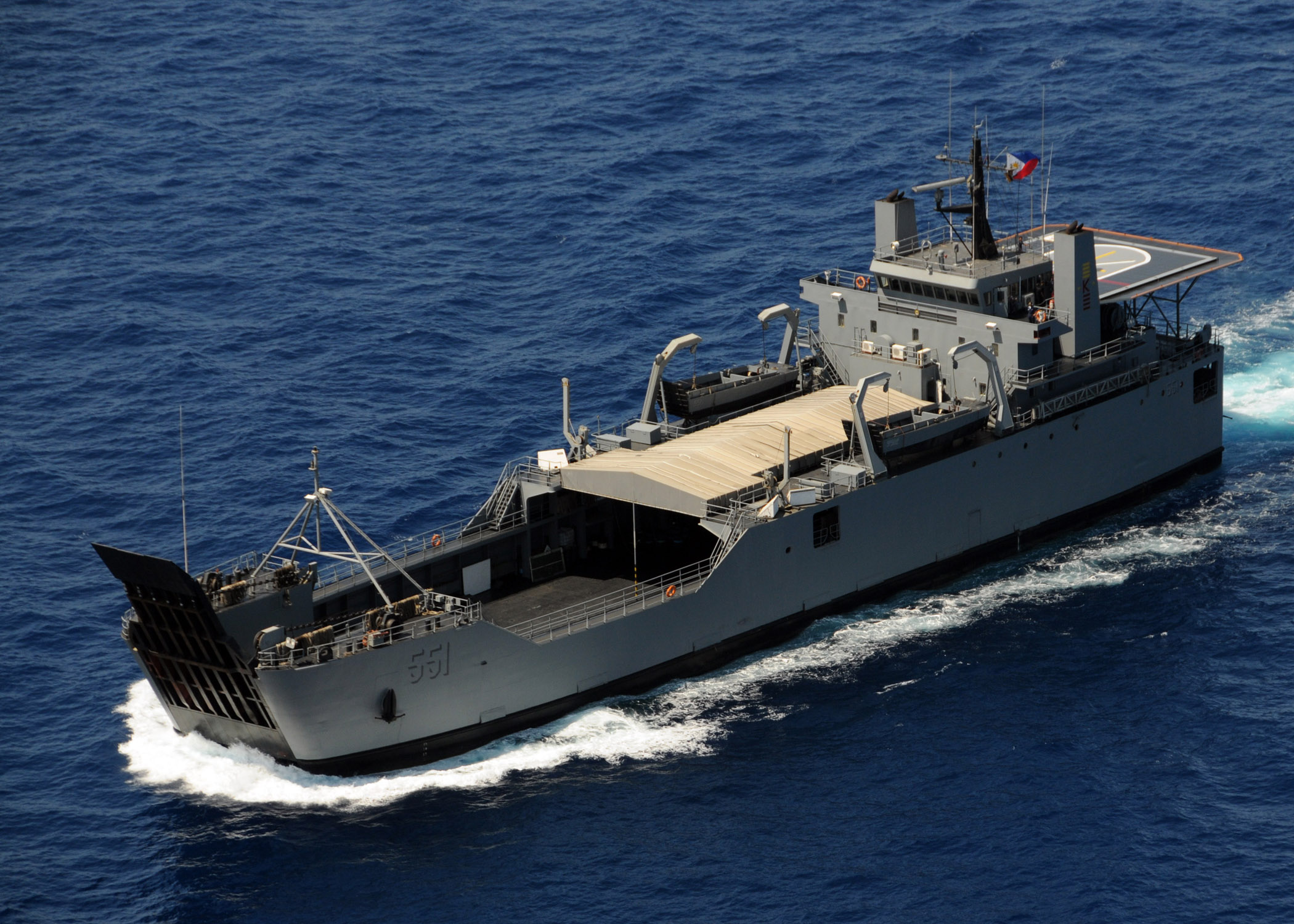
BRP Dagupan City (LC-551)

The Bacolod City-class is the Philippine Navy's main amphibious operation platform prior to the delivery of the Tarlac-class LPD. The two ships were acquired through US Foreign Military Sales (FMS) program. A contract for two ships was announced by Trinity Marine on 3 April 1992, with an option for a third ship which was not taken up. The design was based on a modified version of the US Army's General Frank S. Besson-class LSV, but without accommodation for 150 troops using the space originally for the stern ramp, and the addition of a small helicopter deck. The ship is used in a similar fashion as a Landing Ship-Tank, able to land troops and equipment directly to the beach.

Origin: United States

Size	Performance	Armament	Other features
Displacement: 4,265 tonnes full load Length: 83 meters (272 ft) Complement: 30; 150 Marines	Propulsion: Diesel Engines Maximum speed: 12 knots (22 km/h; 14 mph) Range: 8,300 nautical miles (15,400 km; 9,600 mi)	2 × Oerlikon Mark 4 20mm/70 caliber guns 4 × Browning M2HB .50 caliber heavy machine guns	Aviation: 1-spot helicopter deck Boats Carried: 2 × LCVP at boat davits Vehicle Deck: 2,280 tonnes of vehicles & cargo

Name	In service	Hull number	Commissioned	Unit	Notes
Bacolod City	2	LS-550	1 December 1993	Sealift Amphibious Force	
Dagupan City	2	LS-551	5 April 1994	Sealift Amphibious Force	

=== LST-1/LST-542-class landing ship tank ===
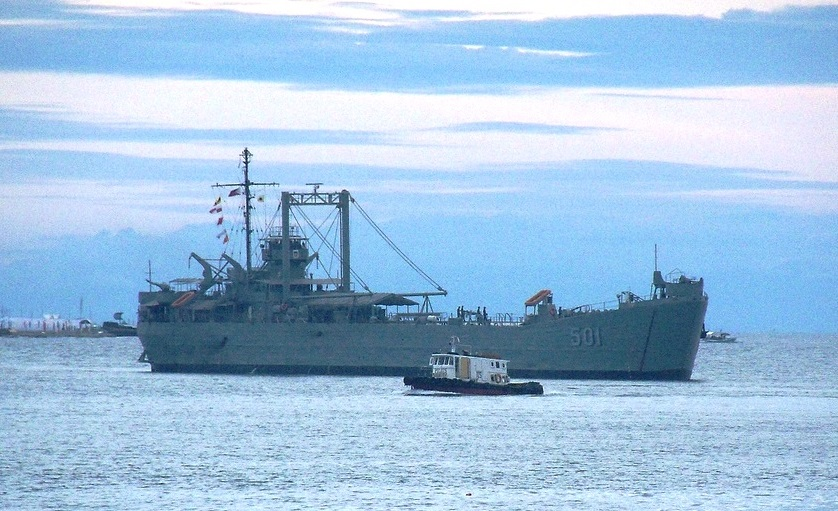
BRP Laguna (LS-501)

Former US Navy LSTs that served during World War II, and transferred to numerous countries including the Philippines. The Philippine Navy received its first ships of the class on 30 December 1946, and has received almost 30 units between 1946 and 1976. Some of those that were received came through South Vietnam as several ships were absorbed by the Philippine Navy upon their escape at the end of the Vietnam War. One of the ships, BRP Sierra Madre was deliberately grounded at Ayungin Shoal and is treated as an active ship despite being modified as a semi-permanent structure and outpost to a few Philippine Marines stationed in the contested territory. Some of the ships were also used as helicopter platforms, stationing utility helicopters from the Philippine Air Force in several occasions, including during tensions with China in the Mischief Reef in 1995.

Origin: United States

Size	Performance	Armament	Other features
Displacement: 4,080 tonnes full load Length: 100 meters (330 ft) Complement: 110; 200 Marines	Propulsion: Diesel Engines Maximum speed: 12 knots (22 km/h; 14 mph) Range: 24,000 nautical miles (44,000 km; 28,000 mi)	2 × Bofors Mark 1 Twin 40mm/60 caliber anti-aircraft guns 4 × Bofors Mark 1 40mm/60 caliber anti-aircraft guns 8 × Oerlikon Mark 4 20mm/70 caliber guns 4 × Browning M2HB .50 caliber heavy machine guns	Aviation: main open deck can be used as 2-spot helicopter deck Boats Carried: 2 × LCVP at boat davits Vehicle Deck: 2,100 tonnes of vehicles & cargo

Name	In service	Hull number	Commissioned	Unit	Notes
Laguna	2	LS-501	13 September 1976	Sealift Amphibious Force	
Benguet	2	LS-507	13 September 1976	Sealift Amphibious Force	
Sierra Madre	2	LS-57	5 April 1976	-	Outpost at Ayungin / Second Thomas Shoal
At least twenty five (25) other ships of the class were retired from service (refer to List of decommissioned landing ships-tank of the Philippine Navy for full list).

=== Tagbanua-class landing craft heavy ===
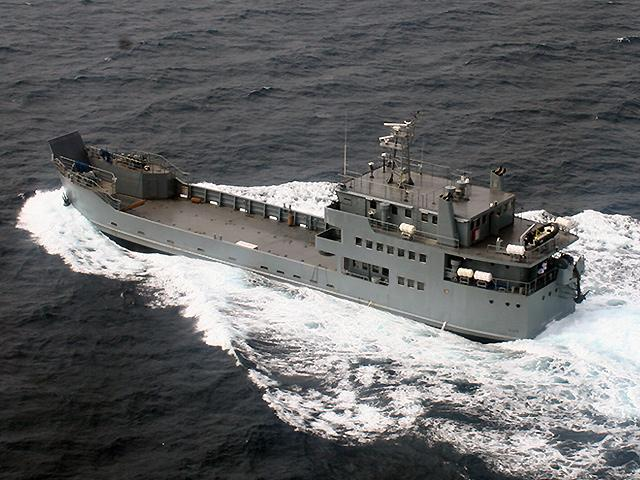
BRP Tagbanua (LC-296)

A sole ship of its class designed and built indigenously after the Philippine Navy called for the construction of a new landing craft utility (LCU). The contract to build 1 ship was awarded to Propmech Corporation in March 2010, with the Philippine Iron Construction and Marine Works (PICMW) building the ship based on a design developed with Propmech Corporation, which also supplied the propulsion and power systems of the ship. The design was not as successful as expected, and additional units were not ordered as the Philippine Navy received used landing crafts from Australia, and looked at acquiring larger, more capable strategic sealift assets.

Origin: Philippines

Size	Performance	Armament	Other features
Displacement: 579 tonnes Length: 51.43 meters (168.7 ft) Complement: 15	Propulsion: Diesel Engines Maximum speed: 15 knots (28 km/h; 17 mph) Range: estimated at 1,500 nautical miles (2,800 km; 1,700 mi) with 110 tonnes of cargo	6 × M2HB Browning .50 cal heavy machine guns	Aviation: none Boats Carried: 1 × RHIB Vehicle Deck: 110 tonnes of vehicles & cargo

Name	In service	Hull number	Commissioned	Unit	Notes
Tagbanua	1	LC-296	14 December 2011	Sealift Amphibious Force	

=== Ivatan-class landing craft heavy ===
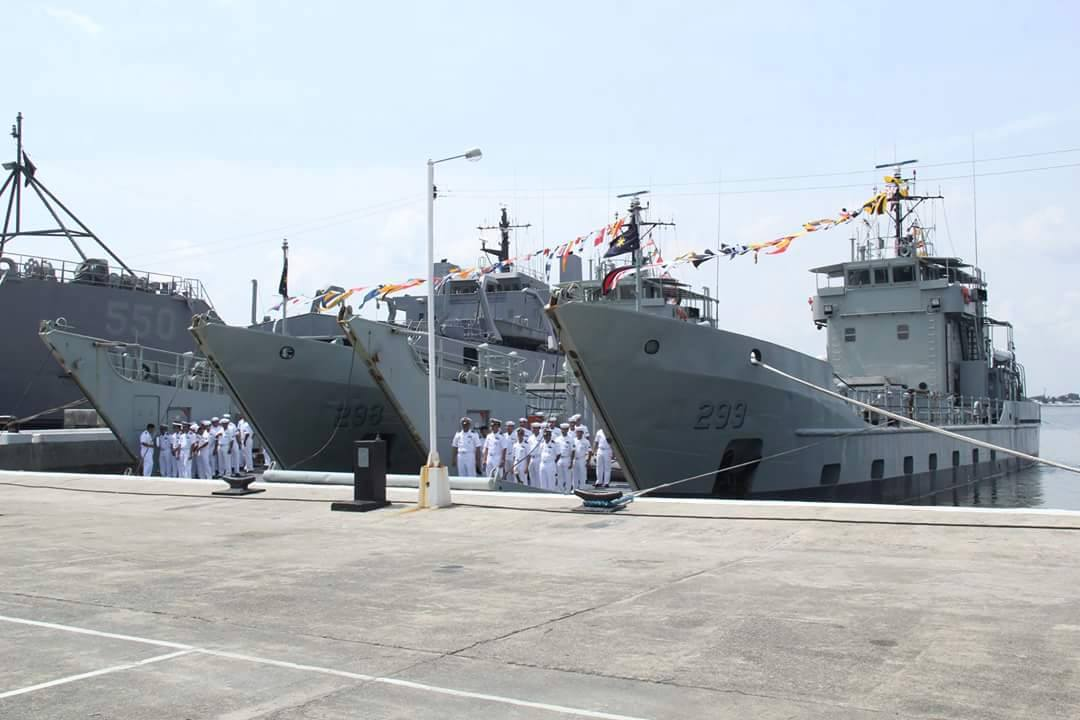
BRP Batak (AT-299) and BRP Ivatan (AT-298)

Former Balikpapan-class landing craft heavy of the Royal Australian Navy, and were built in the 1970s. Two ships were donated by the Australian Government in 2015 as it was noted that marine transport was lacking in the Philippine Navy during HADR operations following Typhoon Yolanda. All three remaining units with the RAN were purchased by the Philippine Government in 2015 and delivered by 2016. They are currently used for transporting both military and civilian equipment and supplies around the country.

Origin: Australia

Size	Performance	Armament	Other features
Displacement: 520 tonnes full load Length: 44.5 meters (146 ft) Complement: 16	Propulsion: Diesel Engines Maximum speed: 10 knots (19 km/h; 12 mph) Range: 1,300 nautical miles (2,400 km; 1,500 mi) with 175 tonnes of cargo	2 × 7.62mm general purpose machine guns	Aviation: none Boats Carried: 2 × FRP service boats Vehicle Deck: 180 tonnes of vehicles & cargo

Name	In service	Hull number	Commissioned	Unit	Notes
Ivatan	5	LC-824	23 July 2015	Sealift Amphibious Force	Formerly AT-298 / LC-298. Pennant number changed, 2026
Batak	5	LC-825	23 July 2015	Sealift Amphibious Force	Formerly AT-299 / LC-299. Pennant number changed, 2026
Waray	5	LC-820	1 June 2016	Sealift Amphibious Force	Formerly AT-288 / LC-288. Pennant number changed, 2026
Iwak	5	LC-821	1 June 2016	Sealift Amphibious Force	Formerly AT-289 / LC-289. Pennant number changed, 2026
Agta	5	LC-822	1 June 2016	Sealift Amphibious Force	Formerly AT-290 / LC-290. Pennant number changed, 2026

=== Manobo-class landing craft, utility ===
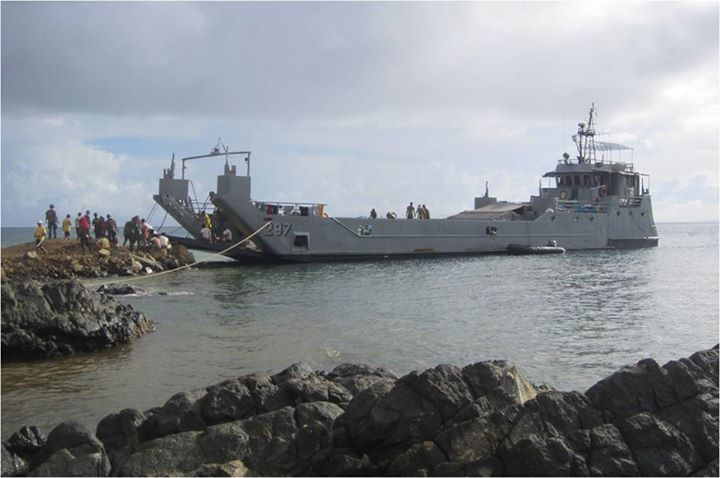
BRP Manobo (LC-297), now LC-806

Built in the Philippines based on a civilian LCU design, the ship was intended to replace a World War 2-era LCU-1466-class landing craft bearing the same name. The only ship of the class, BRP Manobo (LC-806) was commissioned in 2011.

Origin: Philippines

Size	Performance	Armament	Other features
Displacement: ~500 tonnes Length: 50 meters (160 ft) Complement: estimated at 14	Propulsion: 2 x Diesel Engines Maximum speed: estimated at 10 knots (19 km/h; 12 mph) Range: estimated at 600 nautical miles (1,100 km; 690 mi)	4 × M2HB Browning .50 cal heavy machine guns	Aviation: none Boats Carried: RHIBs Vehicle Deck: estimated at 200 tonnes of vehicles & cargo

Name	In service	Hull number	Commissioned	Unit	Notes
Manobo	1	LC-806	2011	Sealift Amphibious Force	Formerly LC-297. Pennant number changed, 2026

=== Mamanwa-class landing craft, utility ===
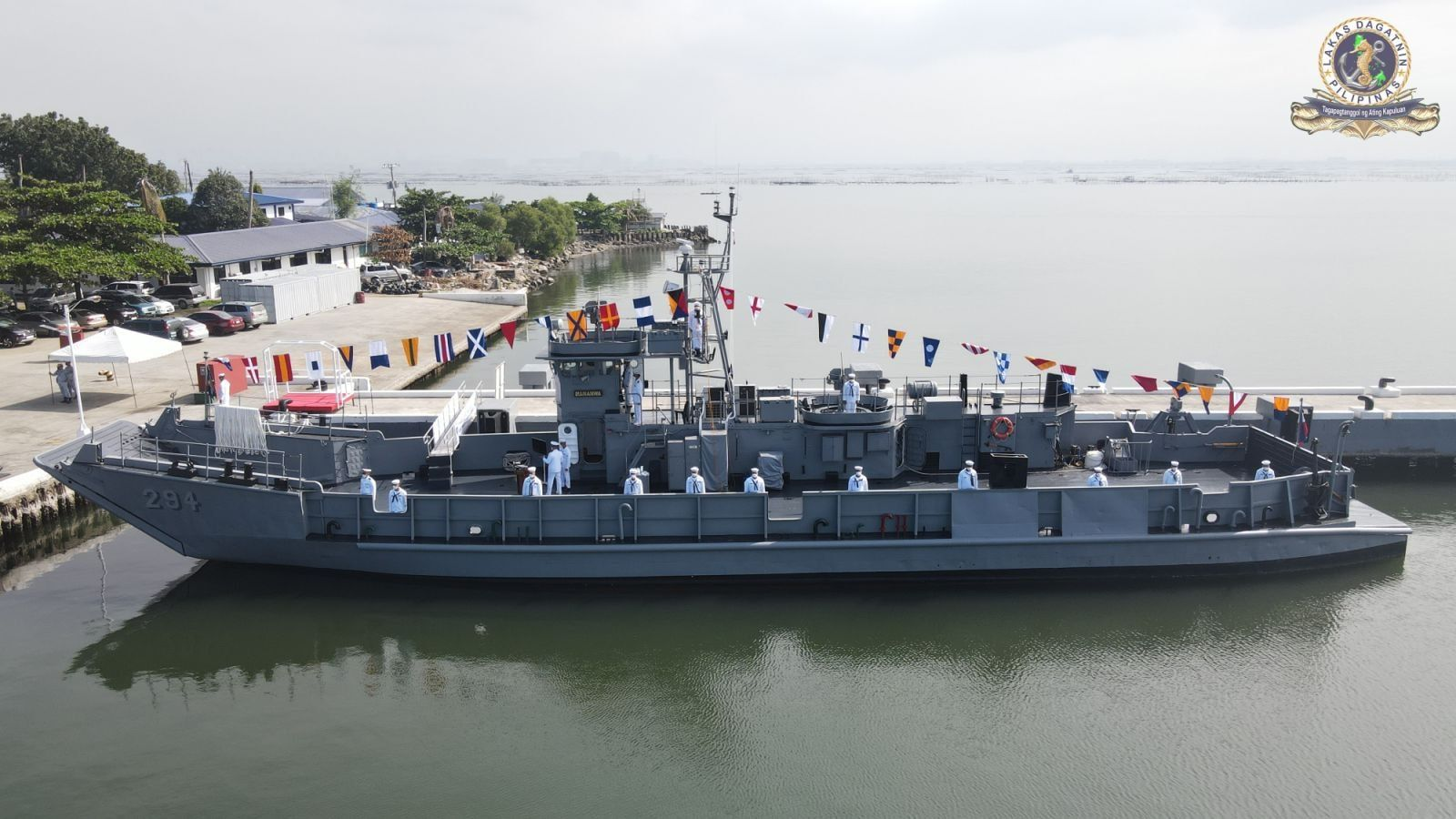
BRP Mamanwa (LC-294)

Originally from the Republic of Korea Navy (ROKN), and transferred to the Philippine Navy. Currently only one ship, the former ROKN LCU-78, has been made available to the Philippine Navy and transferred in 2015, but there are no reports of a potential transfer of additional ships of the class in the future. The design was loosely based on US-designed LCU-1610 by Tacoma Boatbuilding Company, and were built by Korea Tacoma in the 1970s.

Origin: South Korea

Size	Performance	Armament	Other features
Displacement: 415 tonnes Length: 41.10 meters (134.8 ft) Complement: 14	Propulsion: Diesel Engines Maximum speed: 13 knots (24 km/h; 15 mph) Range: estimated at 560 nautical miles (1,040 km; 640 mi)	2 × M2HB Browning .50 cal heavy machine guns	Aviation: none Boats Carried: none Vehicle Deck: 150 tonnes of vehicles & cargo

Name	In service	Hull number	Commissioned	Unit	Notes
Mamanwa	1	LC-294	6 December 2021	Sealift Amphibious Force	

=== LCU-1466-class landing craft, utility ===
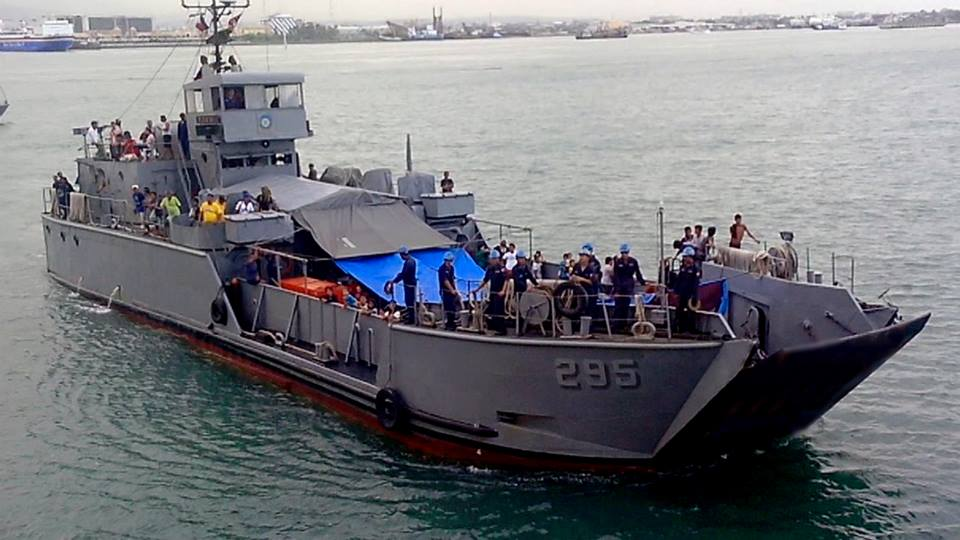
BRP Tausug (AT-295)

U.S. designed landing craft utility based on LCT Mark 5 landing craft tank. Built under license by IHI of Japan for export to U.S. allies and for the Japan Self-Defense Force. Three landing crafts were refurbished and refitted in Japan before they were transferred to the Philippines in 1975. More units transferred to the Philippine Navy in the next few years.

Origin: Japan

Size	Performance	Armament	Other features
Displacement: 360 tonnes full load Length: 36.28 meters (119.0 ft) Complement: 14	Propulsion: 3 x Diesel Engines Maximum speed: 10 knots (19 km/h; 12 mph) Range: 700 nautical miles (1,300 km; 810 mi) at 7 knots	2 × Oerlikon Mark 4 20mm/70 caliber guns 4 × Browning M2HB .50 caliber heavy machine guns	Aviation: none Boats Carried: 2 × FRP service boats Vehicle Deck: 150 tonnes of vehicles & cargo

Name	In service	Hull number	Commissioned	Unit	Notes
BRP Subanon	3	LC-800	17 November 1975	Sealift Amphibious Force	Formerly AT-291 / LC-291. Pennant number changed, 2026
BRP Bagobo	3	AT-293	17 November 1975	Sealift Amphibious Force	
BRP Tausug	3	LC-803	17 November 1975	Sealift Amphibious Force	Formerly AT-295 / LC-295. Pennant number changed, 2026
Five (5) other ships of the class were retired from service including Manobo (refer to List of decommissioned landing crafts of the Philippine Navy for full list).

== Littoral warfare vessels ==
=== Alvarez class patrol boat ===
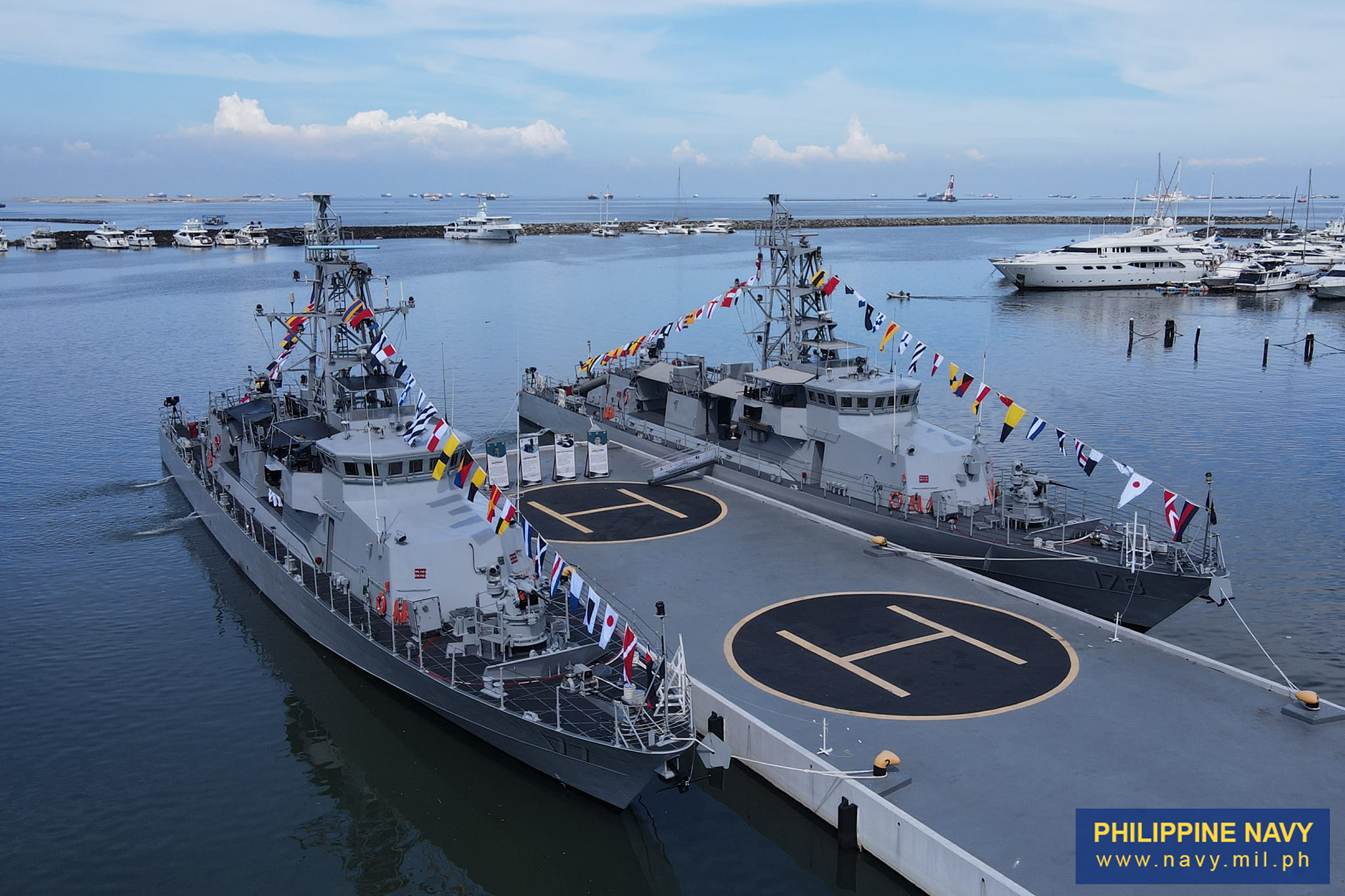
BRP Ladislao Diwa (PS-178) and BRP Valentin Diaz (PS-177).

The Alvarez-class are Philippine Navy versions of the Cyclone-class US Navy inshore patrol ships previously used by the United States Naval Special Warfare Command for low intensity conflict environments. The Philippine Navy received the lead ship of the class, formerly the USS Cyclone (PC-1), and was it transferred at a time when the US Special Operations Command rejected the class for being too big for commando missions, while the Navy Fleet found it too small for patrol and combat missions. Following the US Occupation of Iraq, the US Navy intended to keep the remaining ships of the class until the last ship of the class were decommissioned in 2023, and the Philippine Navy was able to receive two more units, the former USS Monsoon (PC-4) and former USS Chinook (PC-9) which were transferred on 28 March 2023.

Origin: United States

Size	Performance	Armament	Other features
Displacement: 357 tons full load Length: 51.9 metres (170 ft) Complement: 28	Propulsion: Diesel Engines Maximum speed: 35 knots (65 km/h; 40 mph) Range: 2,900 nautical miles (5,400 km; 3,300 mi)	2 x Mk 38 Mod.2 Bushmaster 25mm autocannon (on PS-177 & PS-178); 1 × Mk 38 Mod.1 Bushmaster 25mm autocannon (on PS-176) 1 × Mk 96 Mod. 0 Bushmaster 25mm autocannon with Mk 19 Mod.3 40mm automatic grenade launcher (on PS-176); 2 x Mk 19 Mod.3 40mm automatic grenade launcher (on PS-177 & PS-178) 6 × Browning M2HB .50 caliber heavy machine guns 2 × M60 7.62mm general purpose machine gun	Boats Carried; 1 × 7.2 m (24 ft) RHIB Radar: Sperry Marine RASCAR 3400C surface search radar Sonar: Wesmar side-scanning hull-mounted

Name	In service	Pennant number	Commissioned	Unit	Notes
General Mariano Alvarez	3	PS-176	8 March 2004	Littoral Combat Force	Former USS Cyclone (PC-1)
Valentin Diaz	3	PS-177	11 September 2023	Littoral Combat Force	Former USS Monsoon (PC-4)
Ladislao Diwa	3	PS-178	11 September 2023	Littoral Combat Force	Former USS Chinook (PC-9)

=== Kagitingan class patrol boat ===
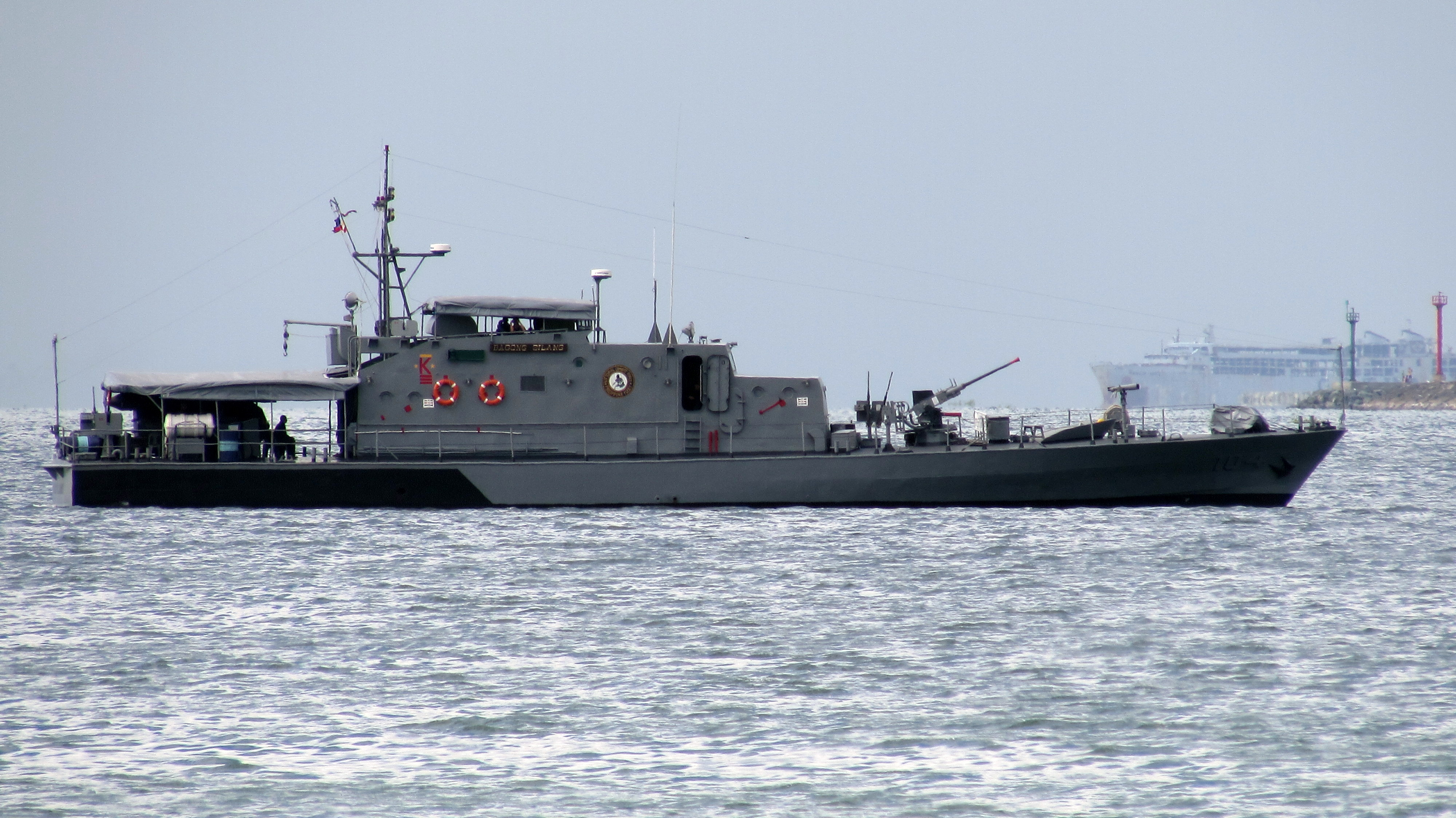
BRP Bagong Silang (PB-104)

Originally designed and built in Germany, the Kagitingan class was supposed to be built in numbers in the Philippines after the initial unit. It was reported that the ships did not reach their potential design and were underpowered and problematic, and were retired in the 1990s but was pressed again to serve due to lack of operating naval assets. Out of four, only 2 ships of the class remain and are expected to be retired from service as more new assets become available. Origin:

Germany / Philippines

Size	Performance	Armament	Other features
Displacement: 160 tonnes full load Length: 37 meters (121 ft) Complement: 30	Propulsion: Diesel Engines Maximum speed: 21 knots (39 km/h; 24 mph) Range: 2,300 nautical miles (4,300 km; 2,600 mi)	1 × Emerlec EX-31 30mm twin guns (only on PB-102) 1 × Bofors Mark 3 40mm/60 caliber gun (only on PB-104) 4 × Browning M2HB .50 caliber heavy machine guns 2 × M60 7.62mm general purpose machine gun	Aviation: None Radar: Furuno navigation radar Sonar: None

Name	In service	Hull number	Commissioned	Unit	Notes
Bagong Silang	1	PB-104	June 1983	Littoral Combat Force	
Three additional ships (Kagitingan, Bagong Lakas and Katapangan) retired from service

=== Acero class fast attack craft ===
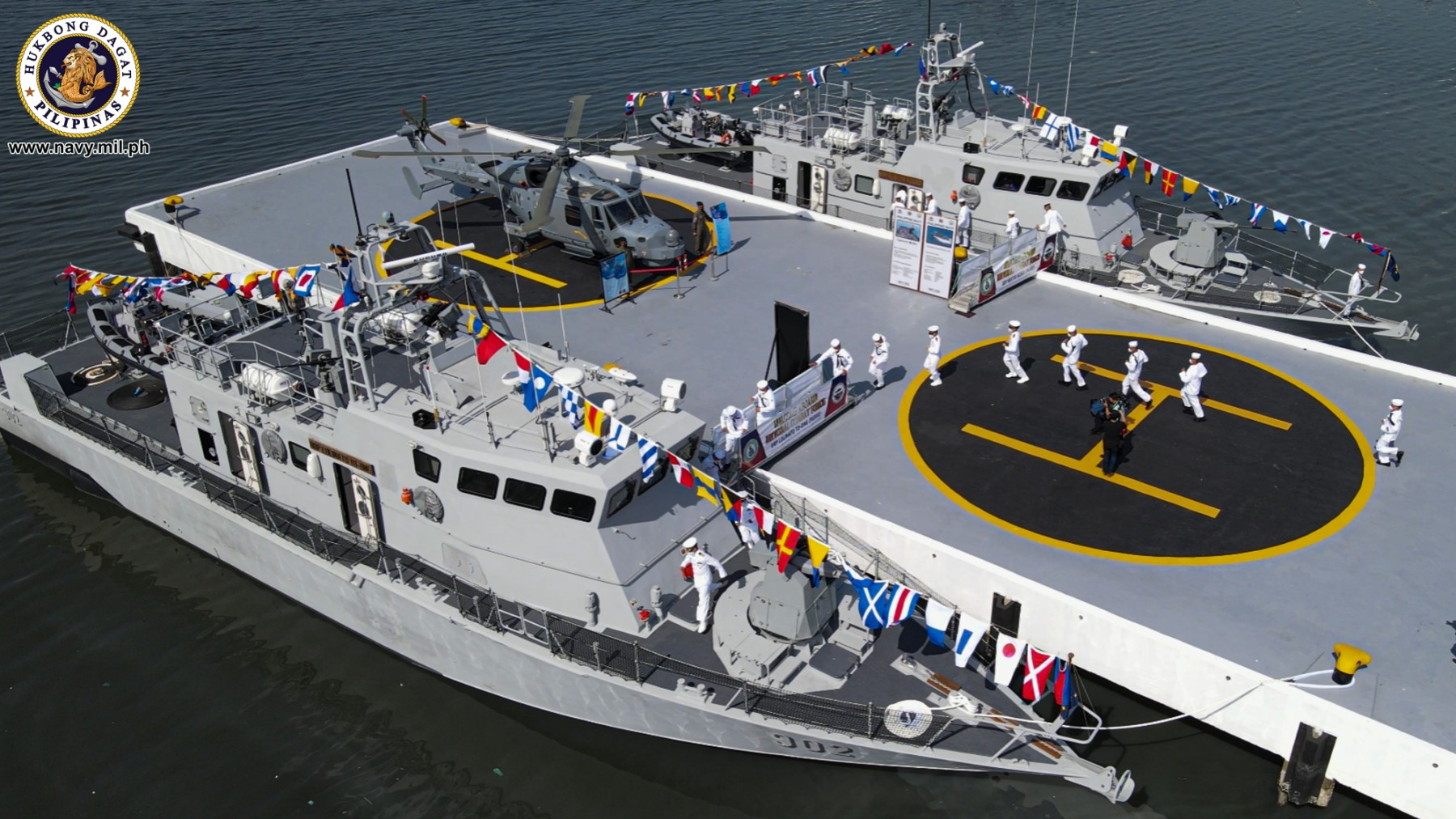

Ordered by the Philippine Navy from Israel Shipyards to eventually replace the Tomas Batilo-class fast attack crafts. Twelve were originally planned but only eight were initially funded as part of the Navy's procurement plan from 2018 to 2022. Four of the boats are to be built in Israel and will feature missile armament using the Rafael Spike NLOS short-range surface-to-surface missile, while the other four will be built in the PN's Cavite Naval Yard under a technology transfer agreement and will only be fitted for but not with the missile system. An additional 1 unit was negotiated by the Philippine Navy, although it will not have missile systems. All are fitted with remote gun systems from Rafael Advanced Defense Systems. The first two units were officially christened on 6 September 2022, and were formally commissioned on 28 November 2022.

Origin: Israel / Philippines

Size	Performance	Armament	Other features
Displacement: 95 tonnes full load Length: 32.65 meters (107.1 ft) Complement: 12	Propulsion: Diesel Engines Maximum speed: 43 knots (80 km/h; 49 mph) Range: 1,600 nautical miles (3,000 km; 1,800 mi) @ 15 knots	1 × Rafael Typhoon MLS-NLOS missile launcher with 8 × Rafael Spike NLOS missiles 1 × ATK Mk.44 30mm Bushmaster autocannon on Rafael Typhoon RCWS mount 2 × Browning M2HB .50 caliber heavy machine guns on Rafael Mini Typhoon RCWS mounts 2 × M60E4 7.62mm general purpose machine guns	Boats Carried; 1 × 4.2 m (14 ft) Inflatable boat Radar: Furuno navigation/surface search radar Sonar: None

Name	In service	Pennant number	Commissioned	Unit	Notes
Nestor Acero	9	PG-200	28 November 2022	Littoral Combat Force	
Lolinato To-ong	9	PG-201	28 November 2022	Littoral Combat Force	
Gener Tinangag	9	PG-903	26 May 2023	Littoral Combat Force	
Domingo Deluana	9	PG-905	26 May 2023	Littoral Combat Force	
Herminigildo Yurong	9	PG-906	21 May 2024	Littoral Combat Force	
Laurence Narag	9	PG-205	21 May 2024	Littoral Combat Force	
Tomas Campo	9	PG-908	13 November 2024	Littoral Combat Force	
Albert Majini	9	PG-909	20 May 2025	Littoral Combat Force	
Audrey Bañares	9	PG-208	24 February 2026	Littoral Combat Force	

=== Navarette class patrol craft ===
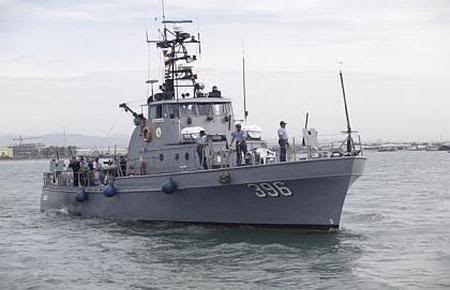
BRP Abraham Campo (PC-396)

Former Point-class coastal cutters of the US Coast Guard. Philippine Navy received several units transferred by the US government and formerly used by the South Vietnamese Navy, but were sold for scrap due to poor condition. Two units were transferred to the Philippine Navy as part of US Military Assistance in 1999 and 2001. They were designed with steel hulls and an aluminum superstructure for durability compared to earlier wooden-hulled patrol crafts.

Origin: United States

Size	Performance	Armament	Other features
Displacement: 65 tonnes full load Length: 25.25 meters (82.8 ft) Complement: 10	Propulsion: Diesel Engines Maximum speed: 17 knots (31 km/h; 20 mph) Range: 1,200 nautical miles (2,200 km; 1,400 mi) @ 11 knots	4 × Browning M2HB .50 caliber heavy machine guns	Boats Carried; 1 × 4 m (13 ft) Inflatable boat Radar: Furuno navigation/surface search radar Sonar: None

Name	In service	Hull number	Commissioned	Unit	Notes
Alberto Navarette	2	PC-394	16 November 2000	Littoral Combat Force	
Abraham Campo	2	PC-396	22 March 2001	Littoral Combat Force	

=== Andrada class patrol craft ===
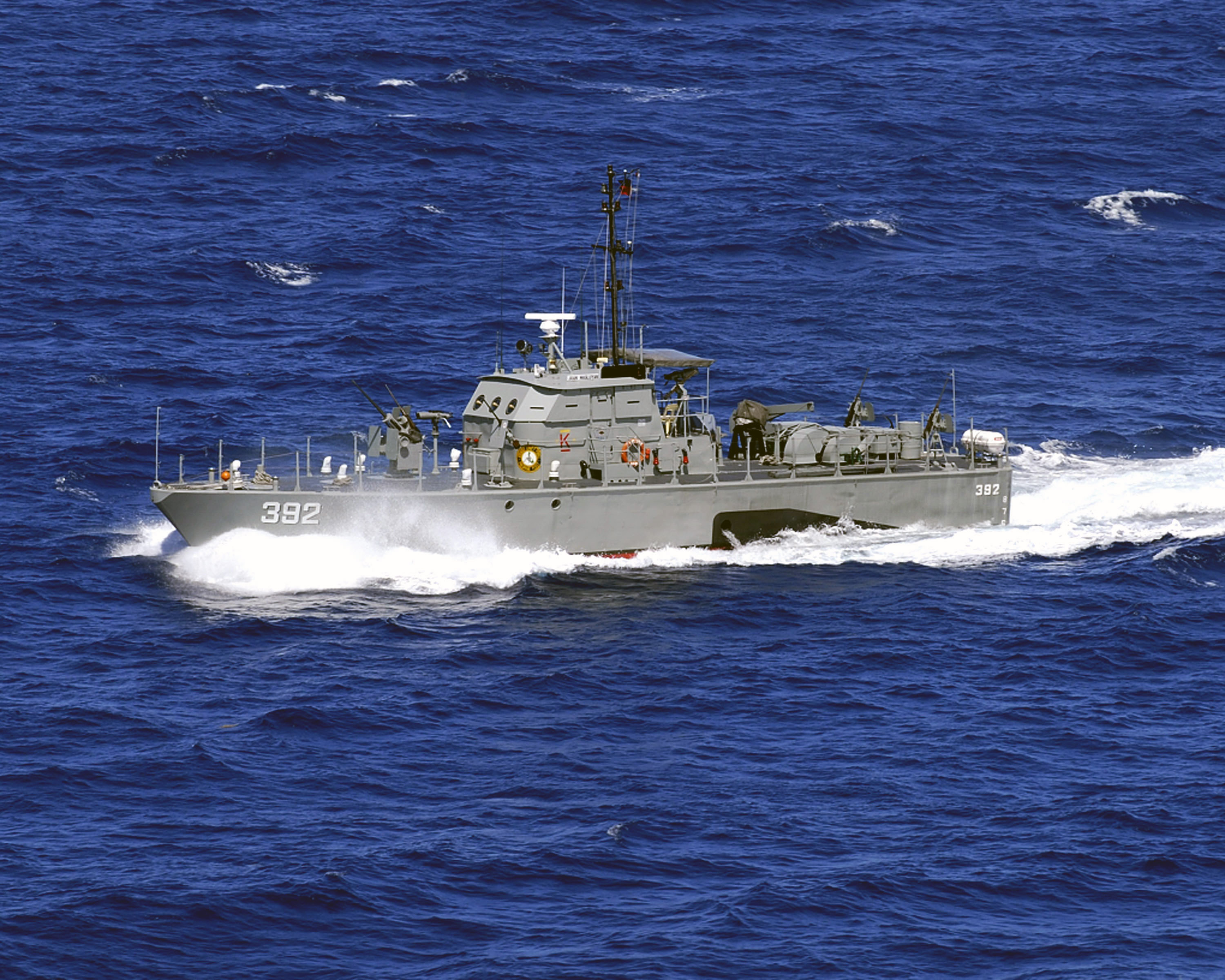
BRP Juan Magluyan (PC-392)

Designed to US Coast Guard standards and originally built by Trinity-Equitable Shipyards in New Orleans, USA. 22 units ordered by the Philippine Navy in several batches, with later batches assembled in the Philippines by Atlantic Gulf & Pacific Shipyard using knock-down kits. Earlier batches from PC-370 to PC-378 were armed only with 12.7mm and 7.62mm machine guns, later variants came standard with Mk. 38 Mod. 0 25mm Bushmaster cannons. Upgrade works are planned but still pending funding approval.

Origin: United States / Philippines

Size	Performance	Armament	Other features
Displacement: 56.4 tonnes full load Length: 24.03 meters (78.8 ft) Complement: 12	Propulsion: Diesel Engines Maximum speed: 28 knots (52 km/h; 32 mph) Range: 1,200 nautical miles (2,200 km; 1,400 mi) @ 12 knots	1 × 25mm Bushmaster autocannon on Mk. 38 Mod. 0 mount (only PC-379 to PC-395) 4 × Browning M2HB .50 caliber heavy machine guns 2 × M60E4 7.62mm general purpose machine guns	Boats Carried; 1 × 4 m (13 ft) Inflatable boat Radar: Furuno navigation/surface search radar Sonar: None

Name	In service	Hull number	Commissioned	Unit	Notes
Jose Andrada	22	PC-370	August 1990	Littoral Combat Force	
Enrique Jurado	22	PC-371	24 June 1991	Littoral Combat Force	
Alfredo Peckson	22	PC-372	24 June 1991	Littoral Combat Force	
Simeon Castro	22	PC-374	24 June 1991	Littoral Combat Force	
Carlos Albert	22	PC-375	January 1992	Littoral Combat Force	
Heracleo Alano	22	PC-376	January 1992	Littoral Combat Force	
Liberato Picar	22	PC-377	January 1992	Littoral Combat Force	
Hilario Ruiz	22	PC-378	1 June 1995	Littoral Combat Force	
Rafael Pargas	22	PC-379	1 June 1995	Littoral Combat Force	
Nestor Reinoso	22	PC-380	1 June 1995	Littoral Combat Force	
Dioscoro Papa	22	PC-381	1 June 1995	Littoral Combat Force	
Ismael Lomibao	22	PC-383	1995	Littoral Combat Force	
Leovigildo Gantioqui	22	PC-384	22 May 1996	Littoral Combat Force	
Federico Martir	22	PC-385	22 May 1996	Littoral Combat Force	
Filipino Flojo	22	PC-386	22 May 1996	Littoral Combat Force	
Anastacio Cacayorin	22	PC-387	1996	Littoral Combat Force	
Manuel Gomez	22	PC-388	1996	Littoral Combat Force	
Teotimo Figoracion	22	PC-389	1996	Littoral Combat Force	
Jose Loor Sr.	22	PC-390	1997	Littoral Combat Force	
Juan Magluyan	22	PC-392	March 1998	Littoral Combat Force	
Florencio Inigo	22	PC-393	July 1998	Littoral Combat Force	
Felix Apolinaro	22	PC-395	20 October 2000	Littoral Combat Force	

== Minor surface assets ==
Picture	In Service	Class	Origin	Type	Vessels	Notes
Fast Assault Boats / Patrol Boats Fast PBFs (16)
	12	Multipurpose Assault Craft	Taiwan; Philippines	Assault boats Missile assault boats	BA-482; BA-483; BA-484; BA-485; BA-486; BA-487 BA-488; BA-489; BA-491; BA-492; BA-493; BA-494	
	4	Type 966Y	China	Patrol boats	PB-356; PB-357; PB-358; PB-359	Four patrol craft donated by the Chinese government were formally received on July 27, 2018.
	2	42-foot Speedboat	Philippines	Patrol boats		A single 42-foot speedboat donated by the Philip Morris Fortune Corp. to Naval Forces Eastern Mindanao, formally received on 14 April 2026. Another boat was donated by Philip Morris Fortune Corp. to Naval Command Western Mindanao, and was formally received on 18 August 2026
Unmanned Surface Vessels
	unknown	MARTAC Mantas T12	United States	Small semi-submersible USV	unknown	Acquired from the US through FMF program.
	unknown	MARTAC Devil Ray T38	United States	Medium USV	unknown	Acquired from the US through FMF program.
	4	Ocean Aero Triton	United States	Autonomous underwater and surface vehicle (AUSV)	unknown	The Philippine Navy received four units Ocean Aero Triton autonomous underwater and surface vehicle from the U.S.

== Support vessels ==
Picture	In Service	Class	Origin	Type	Vessels	Notes
Rigid-Hulled Inflatable Boat
	--	Willard Marine Sea Force 730 and 1100 Zodiac Hurricane 733, 753 and 920 Avon Searider SR6 and SR7 Hanwha SeaHawk 700 Safehull Marine 7-m and 11-m RHIB HLB Engineering 8.5-m RHIB	United States France United States South Korea Philippines South Korea	RHIB	diverse brands and different sizes: integrated aboard bigger vessels; and as standalone units	
Auxiliary Ships (16)
	1		Japan	Presidential yacht	BRP Ang Pangulo	
	1		United States	Research vessel	BRP Gregorio Velasquez (AGR-702)	Former UNOLS R/V Melville.
	2			Survey vessel	BRP Fort San Antonio (AM-700); BRP Fort Abad (AM-701)	
	1		United States	Coastal freighter	BRP Mangyan	Ex-US Army and ex-USN FS-524.
	1		United States	Fuel tanker	BRP Lake Buhi (AF-78)	Ex-USN YO-78/YOG-73 gasoline barge.
	1		United States	Water tanker	BRP Lake Buluan (AW-33)	Similar to Lake Mainit class.
	1		Philippines	Ocean Tugboat	AT-010	Based on Robert Allan Ltd's RAmparts 3000W tugboat design, commissioned 11 June 2024.
	1 (+1)		Philippines	Harbor Tugboat	YT-027	Based on Robert Allan Ltd's RAmparts 2700 tugboat design, commissioned 11 June 2024.
	7		United States	Small harbor tug	BRP Igorot (YT-222); BRP Ilonggot (YT-225); BRP Ilonggo (YT-226)(formerly BRP Tasaday; YT-227; YT-228; YT-271; YT-273	YT-222, YT-226 and YT-227 are ex-US Navy 422-class district harbor tugboats. YQ-228 and YQ-273 are ex-US Army tugboats.
	1		Philippines	Harbor Boat	Admiral's Barge (DB-412)	Used for movement around harbors
Miscellaneous Surface Assets (5)
	2	Floating Cranes	United States	Crane vessel	YU-207; YU-206	Built by Todd Shipyards in Seattle Washington, 140 feet 1,407 t derrick barge built for US Navy in 1952 as YD-191 and sold 1980 to PN
	1	ARDC-1 class	United States	Floating Drydock	YD-205	Former US small auxiliary concrete floating drydock ARDC-11, renamed AFDL-44. Loaned by US in 1969, purchased in 1980.
	2	AFDL-1-class	United States	Floating Drydock	YD-200; YD-204	Former US small auxiliary steel floating drydock. YD-200 transferred in 1948, YD-204 purchased in 1980.

== Naval Air Warfare Force (NAWF) ==
Picture	Model	Origin	Type	Variant	In Service	Notes
Fixed-wing Aircraft
	Beechcraft C-12 Huron	United States	Maritime patrol aircraft	TC-12B	(+8)	8 units planned acquisition, originally 13 units offered by US via EDA and FMF programs.
	Beechcraft King Air	United States	Maritime patrol aircraft	C-90	5	ex-JMSDF trainers, with PN tail numbers NV390, NV392, NV393, NV394 and NV395. 4 units ISR-able and 1 unit as cargo.
	BN-2 Islander	United Kingdom	Maritime patrol aircraft Light transport aircraft	BN-2A	5	With t/n NV310, NV311, NV312, NV314 and NV320.
	Cessna 172 Skyhawk	United States	Trainer aircraft Light utility aircraft	172S 172F 172N	4 1 2	Mixed variants inducted on different dates. Older 172F and 172N have t/n NVT324, NVT330 and NVT331. 4 new Cessna 172S acquired via US FMS delivered in February 2022, with t/n NVT350, NVT351, NVT352 and NVT353.
Helicopters
	AgustaWestland AW159	United Kingdom	Anti-submarine warfare	AW159	2 (+6)	6 additional units are to be acquired
	AgustaWestland AW109	Italy	Multi-purpose naval helicopter	AW109E Power	4	Two units, with tail numbers NH434 and NH435, are armed with machine gun pods, while the other three, with tail numbers NH430, NH431 and NH432, are assigned for interim shipborne operations. Tail number NH435 crashed on 5 December 2024, in Cavite and was considered written-off.
	Robinson R44	United States	Light utility helicopter Trainer helicopter	Robinson R44	4	
Unmanned Aerial Vehicles
	Insitu Pacific ScanEagle	United States	Small tactical surveillance UAV	ScanEagle 2	8	Delivered in November 2020 as part of US government's Indo-Pacific Maritime Security Initiative. Tail Numbers NVU-3150 to NVU-3153, NVU-3155 to UNV3158.
		Israel	Aerial target drone system	BQM-74 Chukar	(+ several systems)	Notice of Award (NOA) for the Procurement of Aerial Target Drone Systems for the BRP Antonio Luna (FF-151) released last 17 January 2025. The project which was publicly tendered was won by the Joint Venture of Israeli companies Brovender Shai International Consulting and Marom Dolphin Ltd. Several systems on order.

== Weapon systems ==
Picture	Model	Origin	Type	Variant	Notes
Guns
	Oto Melara 76mm/62 caliber gun	United States Italy	Main gun	Mark 75 Compact Super Rapid	Fitted on Conrado Yap, Del Pilar, and Jacinto-classes Fitted on Jose Rizal, Miguel Malvar and Rajah Sulayman-classes.
	Bofors 40mm L/70 gun	Italy	Secondary gun	Otobreda 40mm/70 caliber twin gun	Fitted on Conrado Yap-class
	Bofors 40mm L/60 gun	United States		Mark 3 single mount	Fitted on LST-1/LST-542, and Kagitingan-classes
	Aselsan GOKDENIZ twin 35mm CIWS	Turkey	Close-In Weapons System (CIWS)	Gokdeniz	Fitted on Miguel Malvar-class.
	Mk.44 Bushmaster II 30mm gun	United States; Turkey United States; Israel	Secondary gun on large ships, main gun on small crafts	Aselsan SMASH RCWS mount Rafael Typhoon Mk.30-C RCWS mount	Fitted on Jose Rizal, and Rajah Sulayman-class Fitted on Acero-class
	M242 Bushmaster 25mm gun	United States United States; Israel United States; United Kingdom	Secondary gun	BAE Mk 38 Mod.1 mount BAE Mk 38 Mod.2 RCWS mount BAE Mk 96 Mod.0 mount MSI Defence Seahawk DS25 RCWS mount	Fitted on Del Pilar, Alvarez, and Jose Andrada-classes Fitted on Del Pilar-class Fitted on Alvarez-class Fitted on Jacinto-class
	Oerlikon Mark 4 20mm/70 caliber gun	United States		Mark 10 single mount	Fitted on LST-1/LST-542-class
	Mark 16 20mm gun	United States		Mark 67 mount	Fitted on Del Pilar and Jacinto-classes
	M2 Browning 12.7mm heavy machine gun	Israel United States		Mini Typhoon RCWS Mk 56 mount	Fitted on MPAC Mk. 3 variant and Acero-class Fitted on almost all ships
Ship-launched Missiles and Torpedoes
	SSM-700K C-Star	South Korea	Over-the-horizon anti-ship missile		Fitted on Jose Rizal and Miguel Malvar classes
	Rafael Spike	Israel	Short-range anti-ship missile	Spike-ER Spike-NLOS	Fitted on MPAC Mk.3-class Fitted on Acero-class
	MBDA VL-MICA	France	Short-range anti-aircraft missile	VL-MICA	Fitted on Miguel Malvar-class
	MBDA Mistral	France	Very short-range anti-aircraft missile	Mistral M3	Fitted on Jose Rizal-class
	Mark 46	United States	Lightweight anti-submarine torpedo		Fitted on Conrado Yap-class
	K745 Blue Shark	South Korea	Lightweight anti-submarine torpedo		Fitted on Jose Rizal and Miguel Malvar classes
Air-launched Missiles and Torpedoes
	Rafael Spike	Israel	Short-range anti-ship missile	Spike-NLOS	Fitted on AW159 Wildcat helicopter
	K745 Blue Shark	South Korea	Lightweight anti-submarine torpedo		Fitted on AW159 Wildcat helicopter
Radar Systems
	Tethered Aerostat Radar System	United States	Aerostat radar system	TCOM 28M	Delivered in July 2017 as part of the US government's Indo-Pacific Maritime Security Initiative.

== Ongoing Acquisition programs ==
Picture	Project Title/ Model	Origin	Type	Name/ Variant	Quantity	Notes
	Offshore Patrol Vessel Acquisition Project	South Korea	Offshore Patrol Vessel	Rajah Sulayman-class	6	Ongoing acquisition, the ships now known as the Rajah Sulayman-class offshore patrol vessels. 2 ships have been delivered and commissioned as of June 2026, 4 more for delivery until 2028.
	Landing Docks Acquisition Project	Indonesia	Landing Platform Dock	Tarlac-class	2	Ongoing acquisition involving the construction and delivery of two brand new 123-meter Landing Platform Docks by PT PAL Indonesia. The first ship is scheduled for launching by 30 June 2026.
	Frigate (Full Complement) Acquisition Project	South Korea	Frigate		2	The Philippine Navy is acquiring 2 brand new frigates, with a budget of $585 Million. A contract with HD Hyundai Heavy Industries was signed on 26 December 2025, with the frigates believed to be improved version of the Philippine Navy's Miguel Malvar-class frigates, which are based on the HDF-3200 product design, to allow faster delivery by reducing time spent on design and procurement of materials.
	Transfer of Abukuma-class destroyer escorts	Japan	Destroyer Escort	Abukuma-class	5	The Philippines has shown interest to acquire as much as six Abukuma-class destroyer escorts from Japan once revisions are made to its arms export policies. A meeting between Philippine Defense Secretary Gilberto Teodoro Jr and Japanese Defense Minister Koizumi Shinjiro in May 2026 in Manila confirmed the establishment of a Working Group on the transfer of warships to the Philippines which includes the Abukuma-class destroyer escorts.
	Transfer of Additional Pohang-class corvette	South Korea	Corvette	Conrado Yap-class	2	Plans are underway to acquire at least two more Pohang-class corvettes from South Korea to complement an existing sistership with the Philippine Navy, the current BRP Conrado Yap (PS-30), with confirmed reports that the Philippine Navy inspected former ROKS Andong (PCC-771) at the Jinhae naval base in South Korea in 2021.
	Submarine and Submarine Basing Facilities Acquisition Project	Contract yet to be awarded	Submarine	Contract yet to be awarded	2	Involves the acquisition of at least 2 brand new diesel-electric hunter killer submarines, and the design and construction of a new submarine basing facilities. Confirmed offers were made by France's Naval Group with their Scorpene Evolved design, Spain's Navantia with a derivative of their S80 submarine, Italy's Fincantieri in partnership with Germany's ThyssenKrupp Marine Systems (TKMS) with the U212 Near Future Submarine (NFS), and South Korea's Hanwha Ocean with their KSS-IIIPN design, as well as the Ocean 1400PN as a cheaper alternative.

== See also ==
- List of decommissioned ships of the Philippine Navy
- List of equipment of the Philippine Army
- List of equipment of the Philippine Air Force
- List of equipment of the Philippine Marine Corps
