= BRP Ladislao Diwa =

Philippine Navy corvette

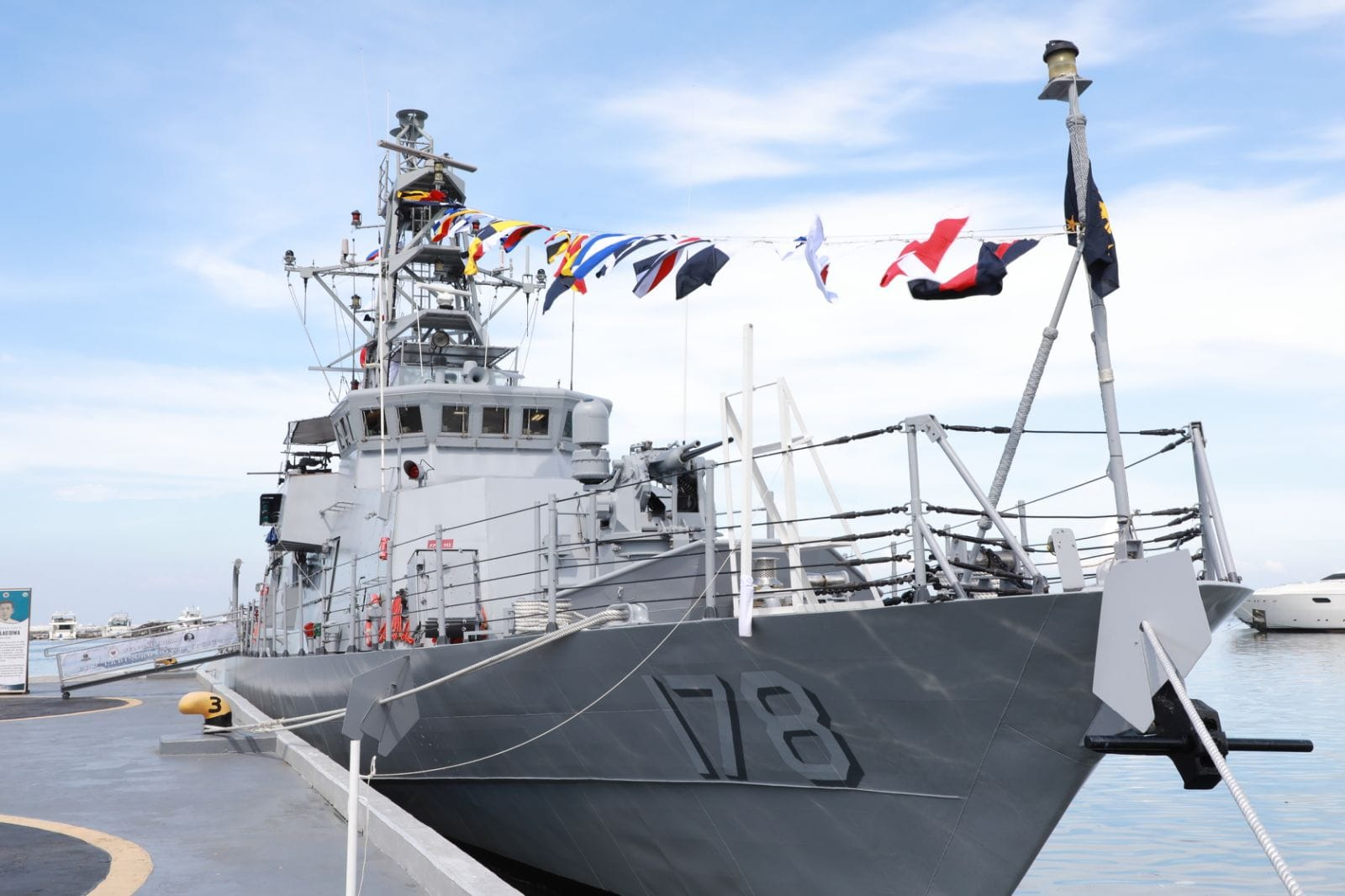
- BRP Ladislao Diwa (PS-178) during its commissioning with the Philippine Navy.

History

United States of America
- Name: USS Chinook
- Builder: Bollinger Shipyards, Lockport, Louisiana
- Laid down: 16 June 1993
- Launched: 26 February 1994
- Acquired: 7 October 1994
- Commissioned: 28 January 1995
- Recommissioned: 22 August 2008
- Decommissioned: 28 March 2023
- Identification: PC-9
- Motto: "Stealth Courage Swiftness"
- Fate: Transferred to Philippine Navy
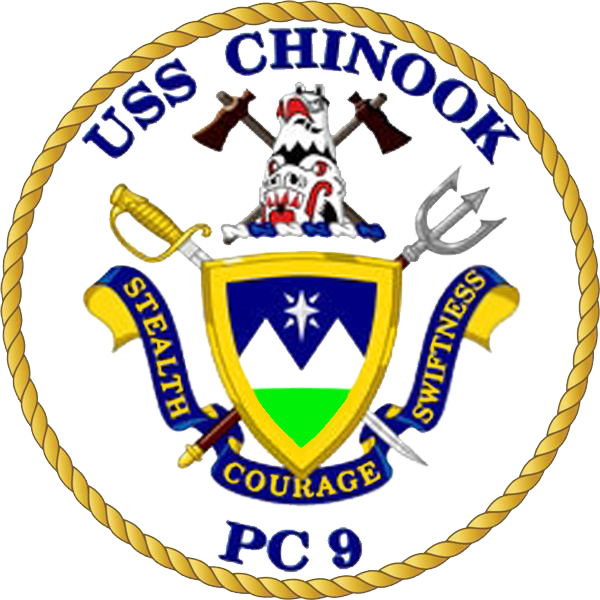
- Badge

Philippines
- Name: BRP Ladislao Diwa
- Namesake: Ladislao Diwa y Nocon
- Acquired: 28 March 2023
- Commissioned: 11 September 2023
- Identification: PS-178
- Status: In service
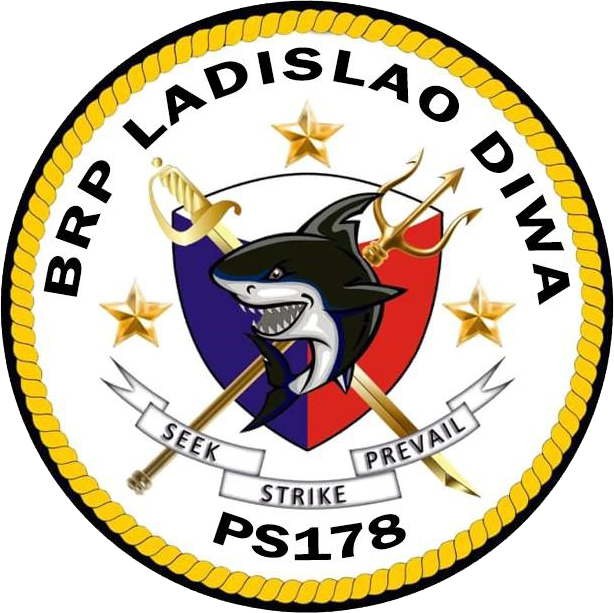
- Badge

General characteristics
- Class & type: Alvarez-class patrol ship
- Displacement: 331 tons
- Length: 174 ft (53 m)
- Beam: 25 ft (7.6 m)
- Draft: 7.5 ft (2.3 m)
- Installed power: 2 × MTU 6V396 TC52 diesel generators
- Propulsion: 4 × Paxman Valenta 16RP200CM diesel engines producing combined total of 13,400 shp (9,990 kW) sustained
- Speed: 35 knots (65 km/h) maximum
- Range: 2,900 mi (2,500 nmi; 4,700 km)at 12 knots (22 km/h; 14 mph)
- Endurance: 10 days
- Boats & landing craft carried: 1 × 7-meter RHIB
- Crew: 4 officers, 24 men, 8 Special Forces
- Sensors & processing systems: AN/SPS-64(V)9 I-band Surface Search Radar; Sperry Vision RASCAR 2100M Combat System; Sperry Vision RASCAR 3400C X-band Navigation/Surface Search Radar; Sperry Vision RASCAR 3400C S-band Navigation/Surface Search Radar; Wesmar side-scanning hull-mounted Sonar; FLIR Systems AN/KAX-1 MarFLIR
- Electronic warfare & decoys: Privateer AN/APR-39(V)1 ESM radar warning; 2 × Mk.52 Mod.0 sextuple Chaff Launchers
- Armament: 2 × Mk.38 Mod.2 Bushmaster 25 mm chain guns; 3 × M2HG Browning 12.7 mm 50 caliber machine guns; 2 × M240 7.62 mm machine gun

BRP Ladislao Diwa (PS-178) is an Alvarez-class patrol ship of the Philippine Navy. She is the Philippine Navy's third ship of the class and was previously a Cyclone-class patrol ship named USS Chinook (PC-9) during her service with the US Navy.

== History ==
=== United States Navy ===
Launched as the ninth of fourteen ships of the Cyclone-class patrol ship, the primary mission of USS Chinook (PC-9) was to serve as a platform for conducting maritime special operations, including interdiction, escort, noncombatant evacuation, reconnaissance, operational deception, intelligence collection, and tactical swimmer operations. Her small size, stealthy construction and high speed were tailored to performing long-range Special Operations Forces (SOF) insertion and extraction as well as other SOF support duties as needed.

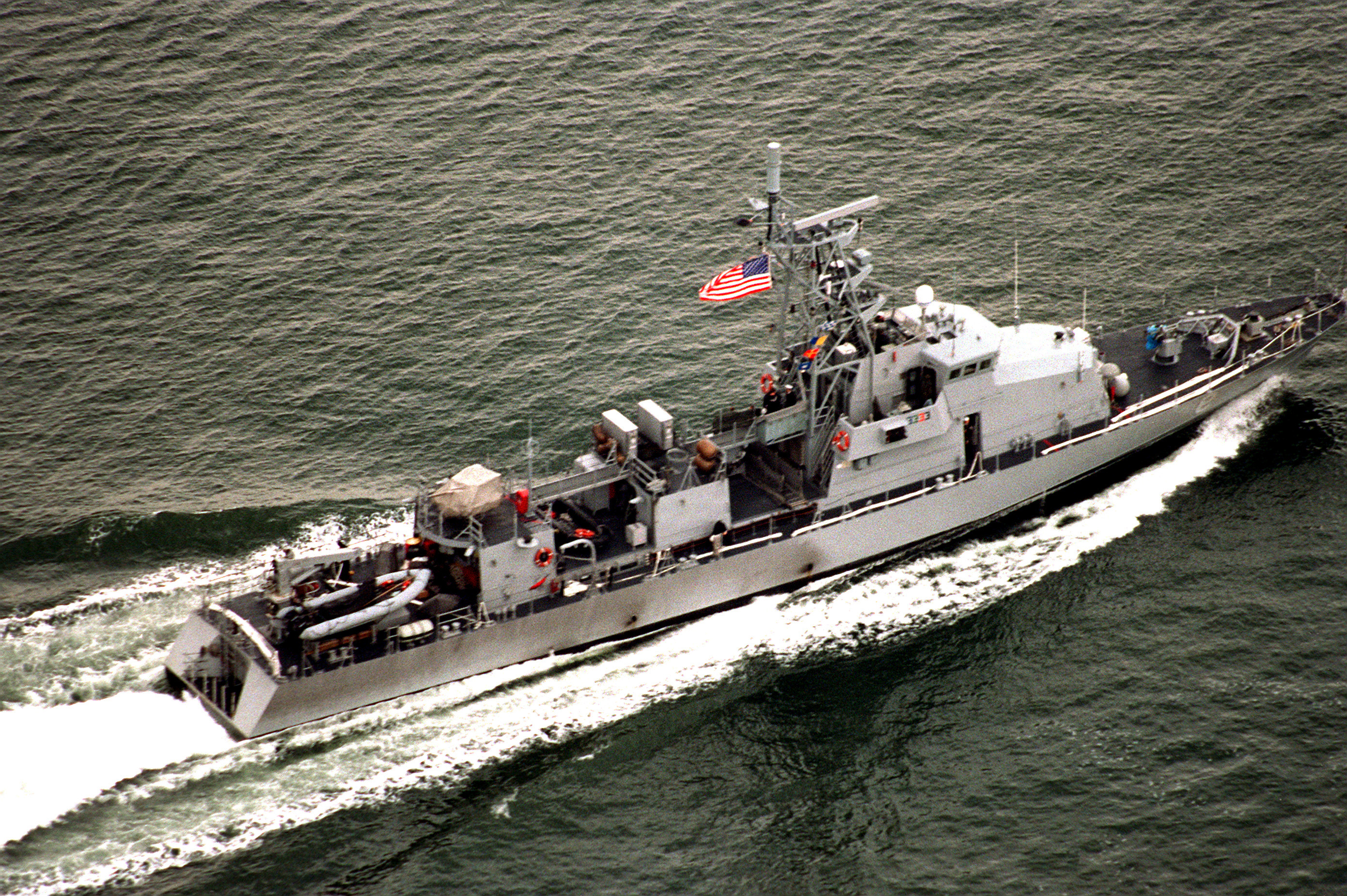
USS Chinook (PC-9)

On 10 January 2023, Chinook, along with sister patrol ship USS Monsoon (PC-4) and guided-missile destroyer USS The Sullivans (DDG-68), stopped and boarded a fishing vessel in the Gulf of Oman that was smuggling over 2000 AK-47 assault rifles.

Chinook together with sistership Monsoon were decommissioned from the US Navy on 28 March 2023, and were transferred to the Philippine Navy on the same day.

=== Philippine Navy ===
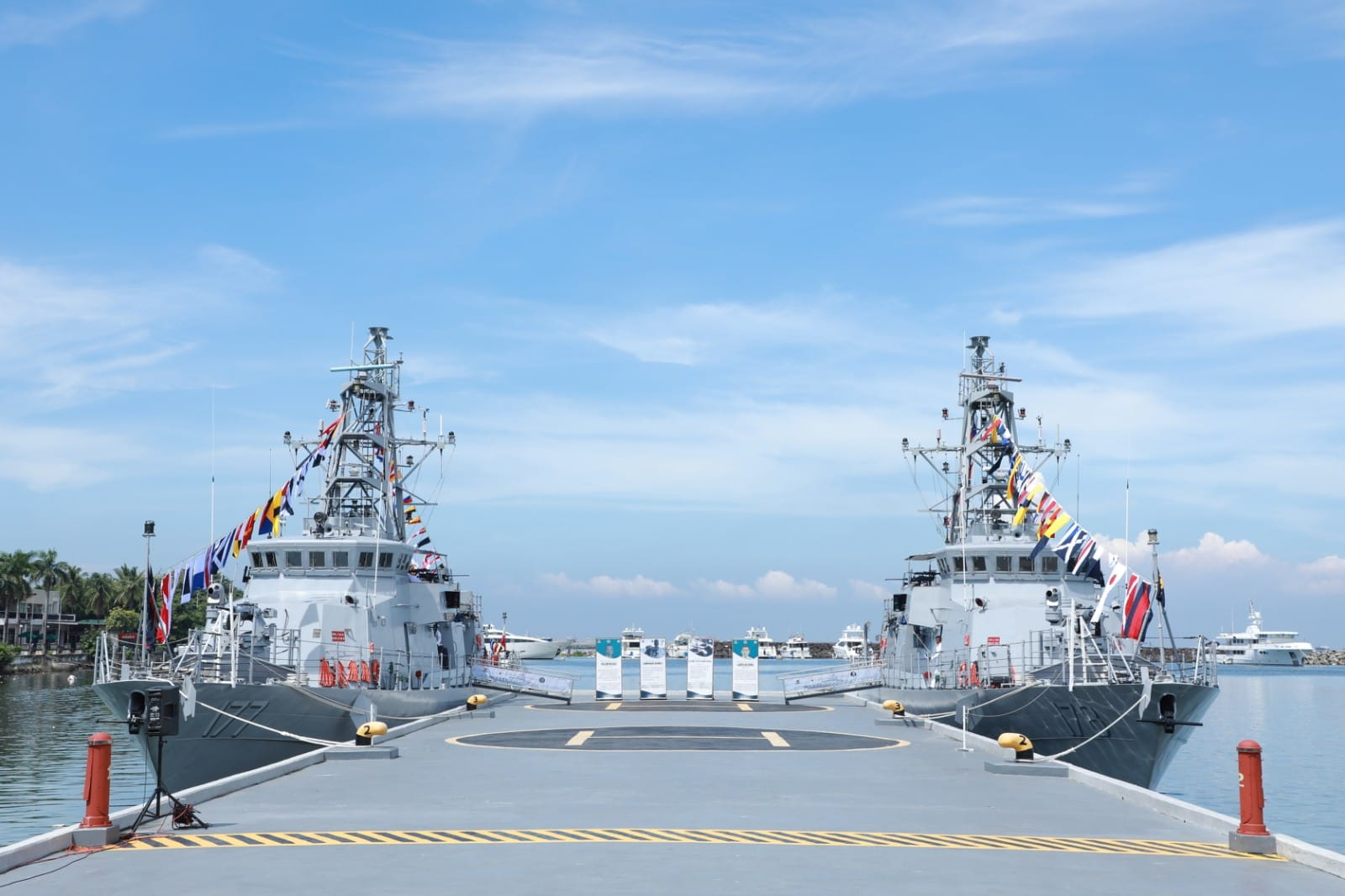
The BRP Valentin Diaz (PS-177) and BRP Ladislao Diwa (PS-178) during their commissioning with the Philippine Navy.

She was rechristened as BRP Ladislao Diwa (PS-178) on 11 September 2023, in honor of a Filipino revolutionary in its war of independence from Spanish colonial rule. She is currently assigned to the Littoral Combat Force of the Philippine Fleet.

The ship is the first ever Philippine Navy ship to use the name.

== See also ==
- List of ships of the Philippine Navy
