= Philippine Navy new 124-meter Landing Platform Dock =

Class of ships for the Philippine Navy

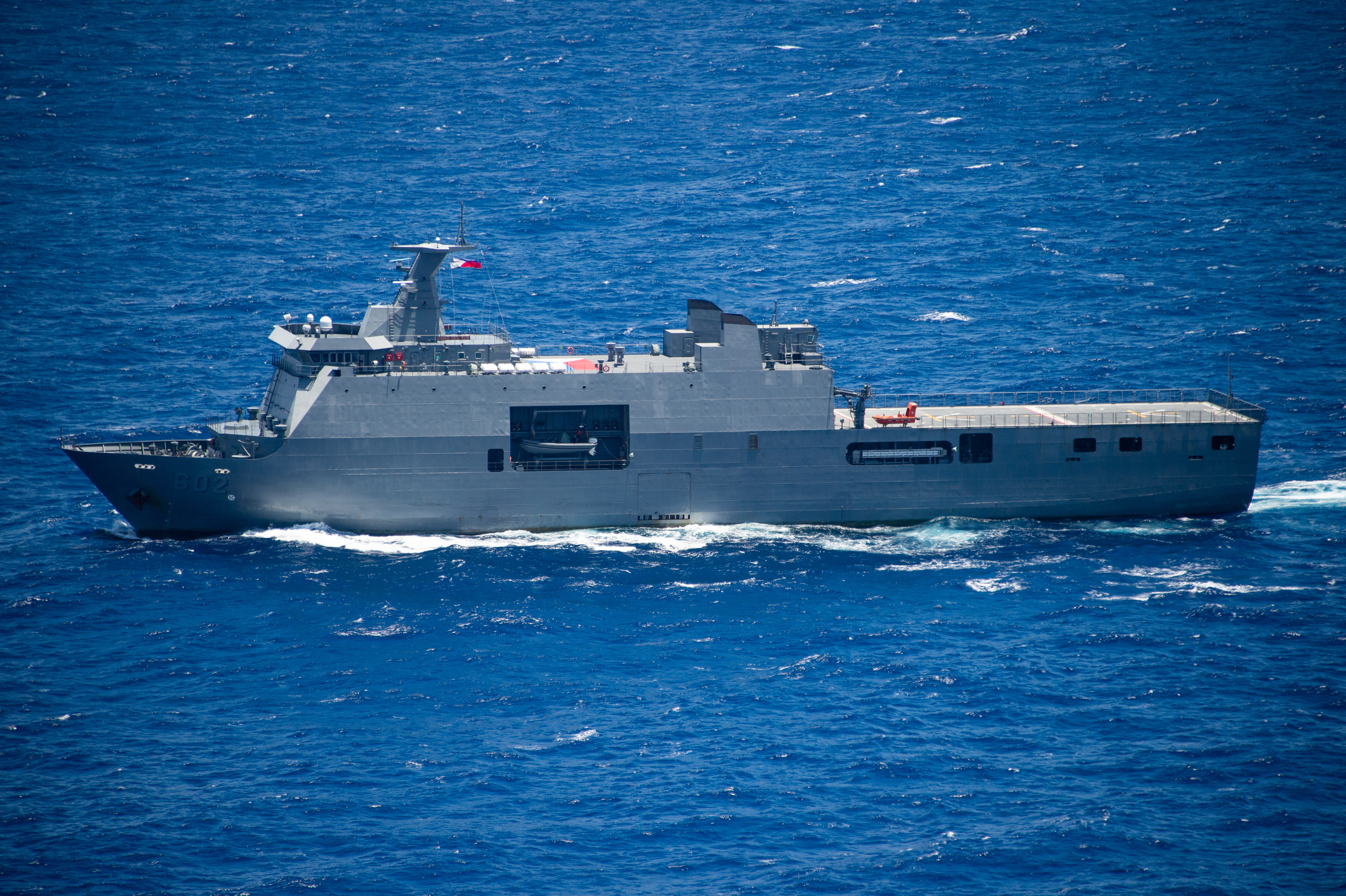
- The future 124-meter Landing Platform Dock for the Philippine Navy is based on an improved Tarlac-class (above) design.

Class overview
- Name: unnamed class
- Builders: PT PAL Indonesia
- Operators: Philippine Navy
- Preceded by: Tarlac-class landing platform dock
- Cost: PH₱2.78 billion (~US$50.5M) per ship
- Built: 2023-2025
- In commission: 2026-2027 (expected)
- Planned: 2
- Building: 2

General characteristics
- Type: Landing Platform Dock
- Displacement: 7,200 tons
- Length: 124 m (406 ft 10 in)
- Beam: 21.8 m (71 ft 6 in)
- Draft: 6.7 m (22 ft 0 in)
- Installed power: 4 × diesel generators
- Propulsion: Combined diesel and diesel (CODAD) arrangement: 2 × diesel engines, each producing 2,920 kW (3,920 bhp)
- Speed: 16 knots (30 km/h; 18 mph) @ 85% MCR
- Range: 9,360 nmi (17,330 km; 10,770 mi) @ 13 knots (24 km/h; 15 mph) cruising speed
- Endurance: 30 days (crew), 15 days (full)
- Boats & landing craft carried: 2 × LCU or LCM at floodable well decks; 2 × RHIB or LCVP at boat davits; Capacity to carry 2 x Multi-Purpose Attack Craft (MPAC) Mk. 3 interdiction boats
- Capacity: 500 troops plus associated vehicles and equipment
- Complement: 121 crew (including air crew)
- Sensors & processing systems: X-band & S-band navigational radars; Forward Looking Infra-Red (FLIR) camera; Combat management system (planned); Surface search radar (planned); Air search radar (planned); Electro-Optical Fire Control System (planned); Hull-mounted sonar (planned)
- Electronic warfare & decoys: Electronic Warfare Suite (planned); 4 × six-tube Terma C-Guard mortar-type decoy launchers (planned)
- Armament: 1 × Oto Melara 76mm Super Rapid on foredeck (FFBNW); 1 x gun-based CIWS, either Rheinmetall Oerlikon Millennium Gun or Aselsan GOKDENIZ (FFBNW); 2 × 30mm Aselsan SMASH secondary guns, one each on port and starboard sides (FFBNW); 8 x .50cal (12.7mm) guns
- Aircraft carried: 2 x 10-ton naval helicopter
- Aviation facilities: Hangar for one medium (10-ton) helicopter; Flight deck for two medium (10-ton) helicopters

The Philippine Navy's new 124-meter Landing Platform Dock is a class of two ships being constructed by PT PAL Indonesia for the navy's Landing Dock Acquisition Project. The class is an improvement on the previously commissioned Tarlac-class which was also constructed by PT PAL. The ships are being acquired as part of Horizon 2 of the Revised AFP Modernization Program, which was set to cover the period of 2018 to 2022.

The ship class has yet to be named. The steel cutting ceremony of the first ship was conducted on 10 August 2023.

== Development ==
=== Concept Design ===
The Philippine Navy included plans to procure 2 new landing platform docks as part of its Horizon 2 modernization phase, with the proposal with a budget of PHP5.56 billion among those approved in-principle by Philippine President Rodrigo Duterte in June 2018. This would allow the Philippine Navy to increase its sealift and amphibious assault capabilities to reach its planned overall capability.

The Philippines' Department of National Defense (DND) signed a contract with Indonesian shipbuilder PT PAL Indonesia on 24 June 2022, with the shipbuilder delivering a variant of their improved 123-meter Strategic Sealift Vessel / Tarlac-class design.

According to the technical specifications released as part of the project's tender documents, the ship will have improvements over the current Tarlac-class landing platform docks, despite both classes originating from a similar base design. The improvements were formulated based on the Philippine Navy's experience in operating the Tarlac-class, and knowing its strengths and shortcomings.

=== Armaments ===
The Philippine Navy released information to tenderers that the ships are to be built with allowance for a 76-millimeter (3.0 in) Oto Melara 76mm Super Rapid main gun, two 30mm Aselsan SMASH secondary guns, either the Rheinmetall Oerlikon Millennium Gun or the Aselsan GOKDENIZ gun-based close-in weapon systems, and 8 manually operated 12.7mm heavy machine guns.

PT PAL confirmed in released proposals that their submitted landing docks design allows for a 76-millimeter (3.0 in) (3 in) main gun on the foredeck, two stern-facing 30 mm (1.2 in) secondary guns will also be fitted, one each on the port and starboard sides. The weapons systems are supposed to be installed separately by the Philippine Navy after delivery.

=== Flight support ===
Originally, the ships were designed to accommodate two medium-sized (10-ton) helicopters on the flight deck, and one similar-sized helicopter on the hangar, with the specifications emphasizing the US-made Sikorsky Black Hawk and Italian-made AgustaWestland AW139 helicopter as basis. But changes in the Philippine Navy's requirement later on changed the design to have a hangar for one medium (10-ton) helicopter and a flight deck for two medium (10-ton) helicopters.

=== Ship systems ===
On 20 July 2024, defense contractor EID, a subsidiary of Cohort plc, announced that it had secured a contract with PT PAL to supply its Integrated Communications Control System (ICCS) for integration into the landing platform docks under construction for the Philippine Navy.

== Construction ==
The first landing platform dock has officially started its construction on 10 August 2023 where a first steel cutting ceremony was held in PT PAL's facility in Surabaya, Indonesia while the second landing platform dock has officially started its construction on 22 January 2024. It is expected that the ship would be completed by 2024, and delivered to the Philippine Navy by 2025.

== Ships of class ==
Ship name	Hull number	Laid down	Launched	Commissioned	Service	Status
BRP Ilocos Norte	TBC	22 January 2024	June 30, 2026		Sealift Amphibious Force	Under construction
BRP Leyte	TBC	29 May 2024			Sealift Amphibious Force	Under construction

== See also ==
- Tarlac-class landing platform dock
- List of equipment of the Philippine Navy
