= BRP Laguna =

Filipino tank landing ship

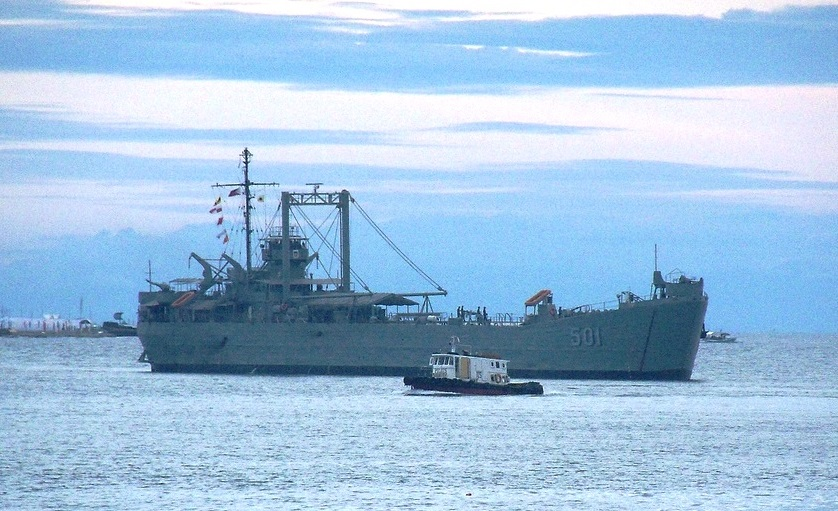
- BRP Laguna (LS-501)

History

United States
- Name: LST-230
- Laid down: 10 June 1943
- Launched: 12 October 1943
- Commissioned: 3 November 1943
- Honours and awards: 2 battle stars
- Fate: Transferred to the Philippine Navy on 13 September 1976

Philippines
- Name: BRP Laguna
- Namesake: Laguna
- Acquired: 13 September 1976
- Identification: LT-501 (September 1976–April 2016); LS-501 (April 2016–present)
- Status: in active service

General characteristics
- Class & type: LST-1-class tank landing ship
- Displacement: 1,780 long tons (1,809 t) light; 3,880 long tons (3,942 t) full
- Length: 328 ft (100 m)
- Beam: 50 ft (15 m)
- Draft: Unloaded : 2 ft 4 in (0.71 m) forward; 7 ft 6 in (2.29 m) aft; Loaded : 8 ft 2 in (2.49 m) forward; 14 ft 1 in (4.29 m) aft
- Depth: 8 ft (2.4 m) forward; 14 ft 4 in (4.37 m) aft (full load)
- Propulsion: 2 × General Motors 12-567 diesel engines, two shafts, twin rudders
- Speed: 12 knots (22 km/h; 14 mph)
- Boats & landing craft carried: 2 or 6 LCVPs
- Troops: Approximately 140 officers and enlisted men
- Complement: 8–10 officers, 100–115 enlisted men
- Armament: 5 × 40 mm guns; 6 × 20 mm guns; 2 × .50 cal (12.7 mm) machine guns; 4 × .30 cal (7.62 mm) machine guns

BRP Laguna (LS-501) is an LST-1-class tank landing ship currently under the Philippine Navy. She was transferred to the Philippine Navy on 13 September 1976.

Formerly known as USS LST-230, She was built for the United States Navy during World War II. LST-230 was laid down on 10 June 1943 at Seneca, Illinois, by the Chicago Bridge & Iron Co. The vessel was launched on 12 October 1943, sponsored by Mrs. Lottie Reeks. LST-230 was commissioned on 3 November 1943. She was previously known as BRP Laguna (LT-501) prior to a classification change implemented by the Philippine Navy starting in April 2016

== Service history ==
During World War II, LST-230 was assigned to the European theater and participated in the invasion of Normandy in June 1944 and the invasion of southern France in August and September 1944. Following the war, LST-230 performed occupation duty in the Far East in September 1945 and March 1946. LST-230 earned two battle stars for World War II service.

She returned to the United States and was decommissioned on 4 March 1946 and was transferred to the Shipping Control Authority, Japan, on 31 March 1952, where she operated as T-LST-230. T-LST-230 was transferred to the Philippine Navy on 13 September 1976, operating as BRP Laguna (LT-501).In 2023 LS501's recent deployment in the WESCOM JOA is its first after five long Years in Port due to Repair and Maintenance.

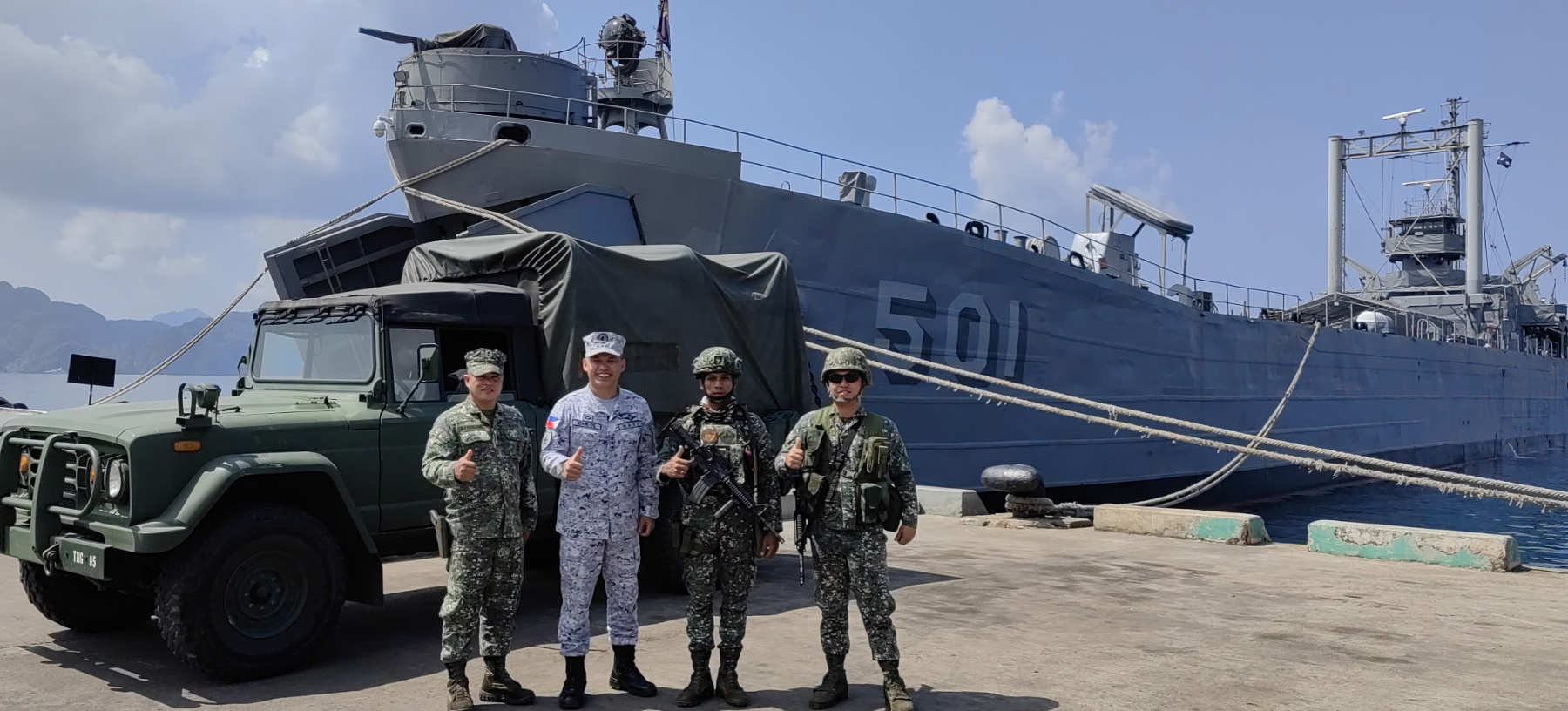
Wish come True - WESCOM delivers KM450 Truck to Marines in Coron

== See also ==
- List of United States Navy LSTs
