= BRP Tagbanua =

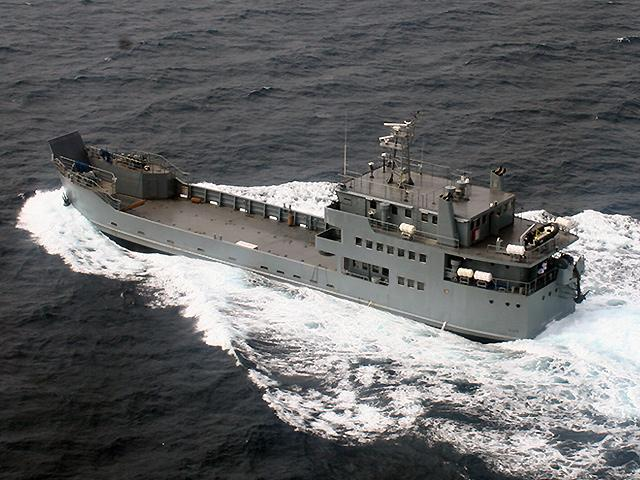

History

Philippines
- Name: Tagbanua
- Namesake: Tagbanua tribe is one of the oldest tribes in the Philippines.
- Operator: Philippine Navy
- Builder: Philippine Iron Construction and Marine Works, Engine: Propmech
- Cost: ₱178.9 million (2011) per unit
- Launched: 28 September 2011
- Sponsored by: Mrs. Victoria Elisa "Viel" Aquino-Dee
- Acquired: November 2011
- Commissioned: 14 December 2011
- Maiden voyage: 10 November 2011
- Status: in active service

General characteristics
- Type: Landing Craft Utility
- Displacement: 579 tonnes (570 long tons)
- Length: 51.43 m (168 ft 9 in)
- Beam: 10.0 m (32 ft 10 in)
- Draft: 1.52 m (5 ft 0 in)
- Depth: 2.44 m (8 ft 0 in)
- Propulsion: Caterpillar CAT C32 ACERT Diesel Marine Engine
- Speed: 15 knots (28 km/h) maximum, 12 knots (22 km/h) cruising speed
- Capacity: 110 tons cargo a 250 m^{2} (2,700 sq ft) space, 200 passengers
- Crew: 15
- Sensors & processing systems: Sperry Marine Visionmaster FT navigation radar
- Armament: 6 × 50 cal. 12.7 mm machine guns

BRP Tagbanua (LC-296) is a landing craft utility of the Philippine Navy. She was named after the Tagbanua tribe mainly residing in Palawan island. She is the largest Philippine-made naval vessel launched to date.

== Construction, trials, and commissioning ==
The LCU Acquisition Project was part of the 2002 Revised Reprioritized Project List with an approved budget of PhP 189 million.

The contract was awarded on 16 March 2010 to Propmech Corporation, which jointly constructed the ship with Philippine Iron Construction and Marine Works (PICMW). Propmech was responsible for the overall design, as well as the engine and propulsion system, and PICMW Inc. for the hull and ship’s fixtures. Fabrication and construction was done at PICMW's shipyard at Jasaan, Misamis Oriental. The ship was launched on 28 September 2011, and her maiden voyage and sea trial was done on 10–11 November 2011 with from Jasaan, Misamis Oriental to the Navotas port in Manila.

She was commissioned as BRP Tagbanua (AT-296) together with other naval assets on a ceremony in Manila on 14 December 2011.

In April 2016, in line with the Philippine Navy Standard Operating Procedures #08, the craft was reclassified from Auxiliary Transport (AT) to Landing Craft (LC), and its hull number changed from AT-296 to LC-296.

== Deployments ==
On 24 February 2013, the Department of Foreign Affairs of the Philippines said the ship sailed from Bongao, Tawi-Tawi, to the village of Tanduo in Lahad Datu, where the followers of the Sultan of Sulu had been held up for weeks in their abortive attempt to reclaim Sabah.
