= BRP Mamanwa =

Philippine Navy landing craft utility

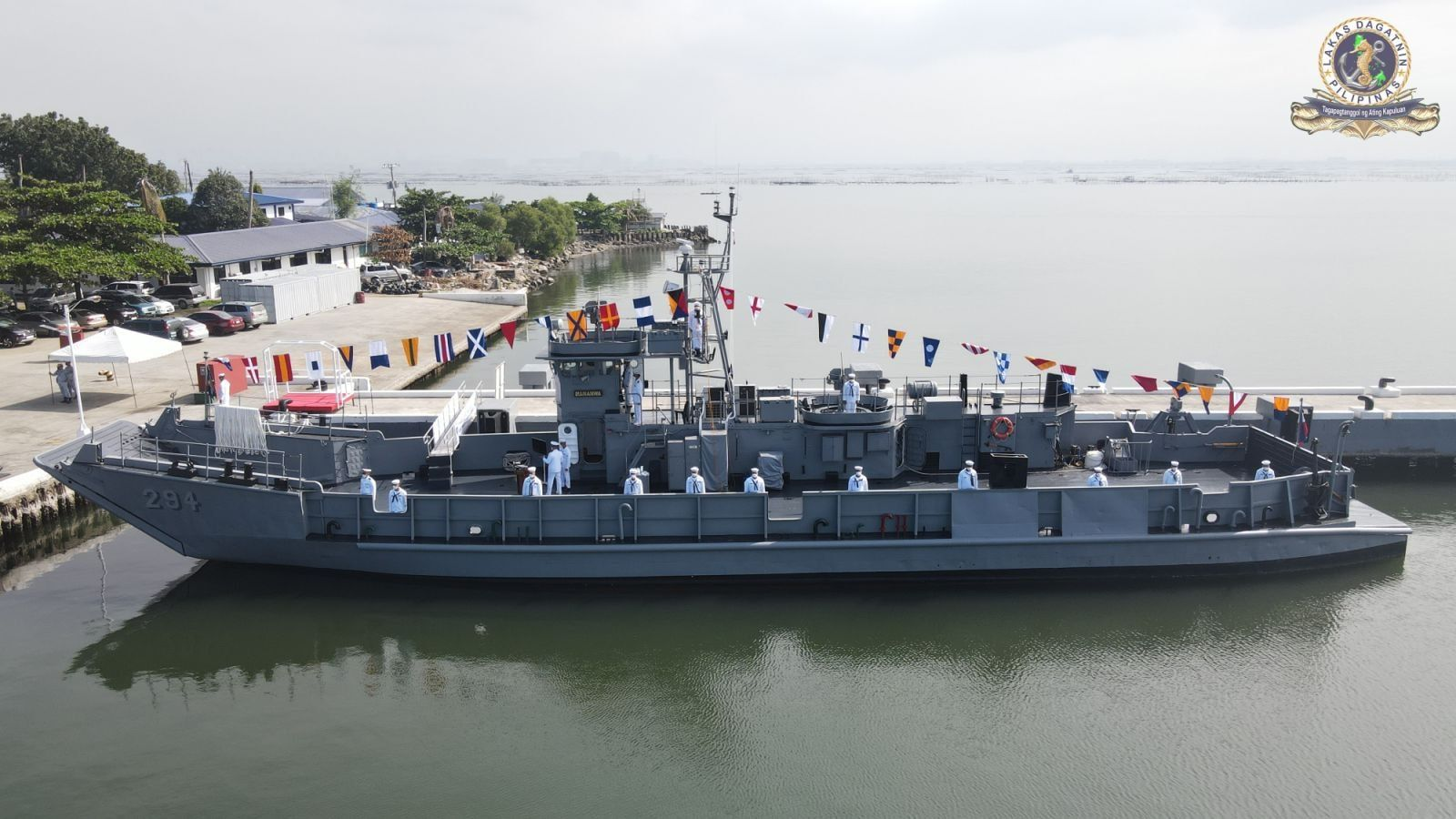
- BRP Mamanwa (LC-294)

History

South Korea
- Name: LCU-78
- Operator: Republic of Korea Navy
- Builder: Korea Tacoma Marine Industries Ltd
- Launched: 12 January 1981
- Commissioned: 1981
- Decommissioned: 24 October 2012
- Fate: Transferred to the Philippine Navy in 2015

History

Philippines
- Name: Mamanwa
- Namesake: Mamanwa tribe is one of the "Lumad" tribes in Mindanao island
- Operator: Philippine Navy
- Builder: Korea Tacoma Shipyard
- Acquired: 2015
- Commissioned: 6 December 2021
- Status: in active service

General characteristics
- Class & type: Mulgae-class
- Type: Landing Craft Utility
- Displacement: 415 tonnes (408 long tons) full load
- Length: 41.10 m (134 ft 10 in)
- Beam: 8.8 m (28 ft 10 in)
- Draft: 1.80 m (5 ft 11 in)
- Propulsion: Caterpillar Diesel Marine Engine
- Speed: 13 knots (24 km/h) maximum, 11 knots (20 km/h) cruising speed
- Capacity: 150 tons cargo
- Crew: 14
- Armament: 2 × 50-cal 12.7 mm machine guns

The BRP Mamanwa (LC-294) is a landing craft utility of the Philippine Navy. She was named after the Mamanwa tribe, one of the Lumad tribes in Mindanao Island in the Southern Philippines. She is the sole Mulgae-class landing craft in Philippine Navy service.

== Transfer, repair and commissioning ==
The former ROKN Mulgae-class (Furseal-class) landing craft utility of the Republic of Korea Navy, the LCU-78, was built by Korea Tacoma Shipyard in South Korea and was launched on 12 January 1981, and was commissioned on the same year. The class was based on the LCU-1610 design from American shipbuilder Tacoma Boatbuilding Company.

LCU-78 was decommissioned on 24 October 2012, and was stored in a naval base in South Korea. The retired landing craft was among those committed by the South Korean Government for transfer to the Philippines in 2014, together with 16 rubber boats and 200 computers.

It was confirmed to have been received by the Philippine Navy by 2015, based on photos of the boat in the Philippine Navy's Sangley Point Naval Base that circulated online.

The ship was originally deemed beyond economical repair by the Philippine Navy in 2016, and was kept at Sangley Point Naval Base, until a decision to repair it was made in 2018. A tender was opened in 2018 for the repair of "LCU ROK 78", but underwent several failures until a winning shipbuilder was awarded to start the works.

The newly repaired landing craft was handed-over to the Philippine Navy in 2021 and was commissioned on 6 December 2021 as the BRP Mamanwa (LC-294).

The ship was assigned with the Philippine Fleet's Sealift and Amphibious Force.
