= Humanitarian response to the Russo-Georgian War =

This article documents the aid given by several countries to the people who suffered due to the Russo-Georgian War.

== Aid for South Ossetia ==
The Russian Federal Agency for State Reserves announced by 9 August 2008 that it was sending humanitarian aid to South Ossetia. Russian Emergencies Minister Sergei Shoigu announced that two convoys with drugs, diesel generators and foods would be sent. Shoigu also said that rescue workers were being readied for deployment to Tskhinvali. Mayor of Moscow Yuri Luzhkov announced that Dr. Leonid Roshal, M.D., was planning to visit South Ossetia.

On August 10, Russian Prime Minister Vladimir Putin promised to spend at least 10 billion rubles to help South Ossetia.

On August 10, Russia said it had sent 120 tons of food to South Ossetia. On the same day, Russia's Emergency Situation Minister Sergey Shoygu said that Russia would send a humanitarian aid convoy with 200 tons of food, 16 tons of medical supplies, six electricity generators and water filters from North Ossetian capital of Vladikavkaz to Tskhinvali. The humanitarian aid convoy of the Russian Emergencies Ministry arrived in South Ossetia on 11 August 2008.

By August 11, the International Committee of the Red Cross (ICRC) planned to provide emergency aid supplies and bring back drinking water to Tskhinvali. The ICRC would cooperate with the Russian Red Cross in North Ossetia and would send 15 tons of medical supplies for wounded, in addition to sending of material for water processing.

The Ossetian diaspora in Yekaterinburg began collecting aid for the refugees. The Russian regions and cities began collecting donations for aid to South Ossetia. The humanitarian activists, organizations and authorities in Nizhny Novgorod, Ulyanovsk Oblast, Sverdlovsk Oblast, Khanty-Mansi Autonomous Okrug, Kurgan Oblast, Arkhangelsk Oblast, Tambov and Moscow were donating money, drugs, clothes, blood or medical services. The humanitarian aid was also collected in Krasnoyarsk.

Kalmykia sent humanitarian aid for South Ossetian refugees to Vladikavkaz. Kabardino-Balkaria announced that it was sending 44 tons of food to South Ossetia. Krasnodar was sending more than 20 tons of humanitarian aid. Kursk Oblast governor promised South Ossetian president to send humanitarian aid. Yamalo-Nenets Autonomous Okrug transferred 300 000 Russian rubles to the bank account. 60 tons of drinking water and 30 tons of flour were sent from Karachay-Cherkessia. The governor of Orenburg Oblast promised humanitarian aid. The Russian Health Ministry sent a plane loaded with drugs to Vladikavkaz.

Kabardino-Balkaria accepted 200 South Ossetian refugees on 11 August. Anapa in Krasnodar Krai accepted more than 300 South Ossetian refugees. Adygea, Makhachkala, Kurgan Oblast, Tambov, Volgograd Oblast, Dagestan, Sochi, Orenburg Oblast, Kalmykia announced willingness to accept South Ossetian refugees. Stavropol Krai announced that it would give jobs to the South Ossetian refugees. Residents of Sevastopol in Ukraine also announced willingness to accept the Ossetian refugees. Sochi also announced willingness to accept up to 15,000 Abkhazian refugees.

Russian ambassador to NATO announced on 11 August 2008 that the Russian government set aside $200 million to help South Ossetia. Deputy Chairman of the Government Sergey Sobyanin and Russian Health Minister Tatyana Golikova announced that 21 million rubles would be given to the non-working South Ossetian pensioners.

The Russian Ministry of Communications and Mass Media announced that all accommodation points of the South Ossetian refugees would be provided with free phone and postal services.

On August 12, Russian Post began accepting money from the citizens for transferring to the bank account of the government of North Ossetia without any commission fees. The authorities of Ivanovo, and the Public Chamber of Voronezh Oblast began preparing the humanitarian aid for South Ossetia.

The Government of the Netherlands announced they would donate €500 thousand to South Ossetia via the International Committee of the Red Cross.

Mayor of Kharkiv Mykhailo Dobkin proposed to receive South Ossetian children in the health camps.

By 13 August, more than 45 thousand workers of the RAO Energy Systems of the East transferred their daily wage to the bank account of the North Ossetian government for aid to South Ossetia.

On 13 August, Kazakhstan announced humanitarian aid for South Ossetia.

On August 13, Sergei Shoigu said that the forces of the Russian Ministry of Emergency Situations would work in South Ossetia till winter. The Russian Ministry of Emergency Situations had delivered 167.8 tons of humanitarian aid to South Ossetia by the morning of 14 August. On August 15, the Ministry sent a fifth humanitarian convoy carrying 190 tons of supplies to Tskhinvali.

Sberbank opened an account for humanitarian aid. Sberbank would begin payouts to the South Ossetian residents on 14 August.

The U.N. World Food Programme said on 13 August that 34 metric tons of high energy cookies had been sent to refugees in Russia.

The residents of Saratov Oblast sent humanitarian aid to Vladikavkaz on 14 August. A charity concert was held in Petropavlovsk-Kamchatskiy. The Georgian diaspora in Sochi transferred more than 1 million Russian rubles to South Ossetia and had purchased supplies in Turkey for South Ossetia.

The United Nations and humanitarian missions said that they could not enter South Ossetia and urged for the humanitarian corridor to be established.

Belarus sent humanitarian aid to South Ossetia. Belarus was also ready to host around 3,000 children from South Ossetia. Donetsk City Council in Ukraine announced that they were ready to provide humanitarian assistance to Tskhinvali residents.

International Rescue Committee official said that Russia was taking care of about 34,000 South Ossetian refugees, mostly women and children, providing them with temporary living places and Russia was going to pay out about $20 million to take care of refugees. According to IRC official, the Russian Red Cross and International Rescue Committee had also undertaken humanitarian activity.

On August 16, several hundred construction workers from North Ossetia–Alania were scheduled to arrive to rebuild Tskhinvali.

According to the Ministry of Emergency Situations of Russia, the Post-Soviet states had donated more than 130 tons of humanitarian aid to South Ossetia by 21 August.

On 21 August 2008, Chinese Ambassador to Russia told the Russian Foreign Ministry official that the Chinese government was planning to send humanitarian aid to South Ossetia.

The United States Agency for International Development stated that it was not permitted by Russia to enter South Ossetia.

On 23 August 2008, Donbas sent 100 tons of sweets for South Ossetians.

It was reported on 25 August 2008 that the administrations of some Russian regions were coercing the workers into transferring money to South Ossetia.

The Russian Orthodox Church began distributing humanitarian aid in Tskhinvali on 2 September 2008. The Russian orthodox believers had donated 17 million Russian rubles by the end of August 2008 for aid to South Ossetia.

== Aid for Georgia ==
On 10 August 2008, Latvia-Georgia Cooperation Foundation announced that it had begun accepting financial donations for the humanitarian assistance for Georgia.

On 11 August 2008, the US Embassy in Georgia announced $250,000 aid for about 10,000 people. Deputy State Department spokesman Robert Wood said that other supplies were being readied and additional supplies were being delivered from Germany to replenish the initial package of aid.

By August 11, the World Food Programme stated that it had "provided a 10-day food ration to more than 1,900 displaced people living in shelters" in Tbilisi in the past several days and that Russian bombings hindered its work in Georgia. The United Nations High Commissioner for Refugees (UNHCR) provided humanitarian assistance to 300 Georgians displaced from South Ossetia, and gave tents along with other provisions in Gori. Head of the UNHCR António Guterres donated $2 million and increased UNHCR's presence in the region. Blankets along with other supplies from Dubai would be flown on the first delivery to Georgia overnight on 11 August by the UHCR and another air delivery from Copenhagen would arrive on 13 August, with both air deliveries providing for up to 30,000 people. The International Committee of the Red Cross (ICRC) sent surgeons on 12 August to Georgia and the Norwegian Red Cross was deploying a field hospital. The ICRC had visited hospitals both in Russia and Georgia.

Germany pledged $1.5 million, while France promised to send 30 metric tons of supplies. 30 tons of French humanitarian aid arrived in Georgia on 12 August, which was the first foreign aid for Georgia in August 2008.

On August 12, the Romanian Supreme Council of National Defense decided to send humanitarian aid to Georgia, consisting of drugs and medical equipment. Spain announced it would donate €0.5 million in aid and was cooperating with the Red Cross to help refugees. Latvia dispatched a cargo of medical supplies valued at 20,000 lats to Georgia; the Government also donated 100,000 lats to Georgia. Lithuania gave Georgia 86,000 euros worth of aid in sleeping bags and medical supplies. Estonia sent, in addition to humanitarian aid, computer experts to fend off pro-Russian hackers.

Ukraine announced 30 million Ukrainian hryvnia ($6 million) for humanitarian aid for Georgia on 12 August 2008. Ukrainian planes had delivered 132 tons of humanitarian aid to Georgia by 15 August. On 10 September 2008, the Ukrainian government donated 50 million hryvnia ($10 million) humanitarian assistance to Georgia.

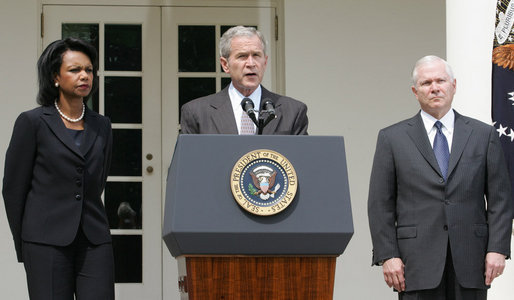
US President George W. Bush (center) announcing the planned U.S. delivery of aid to Georgia, headed by Secretary of Defense Robert Gates (right)

On August 13, United States President George W. Bush said the U.S. would send humanitarian aid to Georgia. On the same day, Czech Republic and its armed forces sent one plane of supplies, mainly blood products, which marked the first time Czech Republic sent blood to a foreign state. Australia was readying a humanitarian aid for Georgia.

On August 14, Estonia sent €250,000 humanitarian aid and medical specialists to Georgia. Earlier, Estonia had sent 5,5 tons of medical supplies to Georgia.

Spokesman for United Nations High Commissioner for Refugees Ron Redmond said that UNHCR had sent 66 metric tons of aid from Dubai to Tbilisi by air and additional deliveries of relief would be sent to Tbilisi and Vladikavkaz. According to Redmond, 2000 Georgians had received aid and 40000 could access the supplies, although the situation on the ground made it hard to distribute the relief. Benjamin Perks, deputy head of mission of UNICEF in Georgia, said UNICEF was tending to medical, water, and food supplies for internally displaced children near Tbilisi.

United States Department of State spokesman said that the United States Agency for International Development had allotted $250,000 for emergency aid for Georgia and the U.S. Embassy in Tbilisi had distributed $1.2 million of packages. The United States Department of Defense stated that military planes carrying humanitarian deliveries had arrived in Tbilisi.

Reuters reported on August 15 that supplies were being given away in the town of Gori occupied by Russian forces. The United States provided a $1 million grant to the World Food Programme to obtain food locally.

On August 18, a Russian humanitarian aid convoy was also sent to Georgian city of Gori.

On August 24, the U.S. Navy Destroyer USS McFaul docked at Georgia's Black Sea port Batumi and delivered humanitarian supplies.

On August 27, Canada's International Co-operation Minister Bev Oda announced an additional $2 million in humanitarian aid for 159,000 displaced people in addition to original $1 million pledged on 12 August.

On August 28, Lithuanian people sent to Tbilisi 5 tons of humanitarian assistance, the fifth donation by Lithuania.

In November 2008, Georgian diaspora of Moscow sent $10 thousand donation to the Georgian victims of the war.
