= USS Harpers Ferry =

US Navy ship, LSD-49

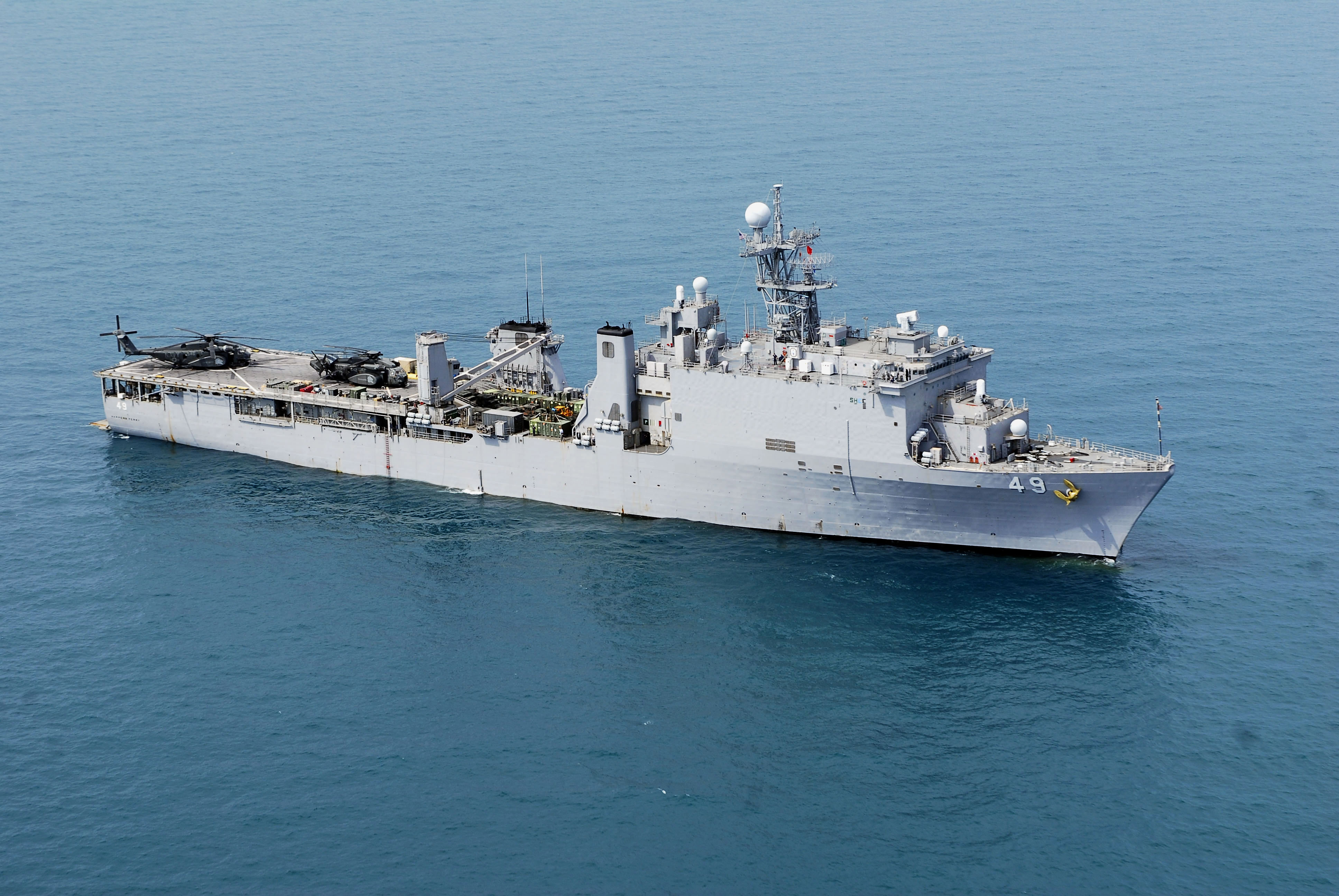
- USS Harpers Ferry (LSD 49) at anchor in the Gulf of Thailand.

History

United States
- Name: Harpers Ferry
- Namesake: Harpers Ferry, West Virginia
- Ordered: 17 June 1988
- Builder: Avondale Shipyards
- Laid down: 15 April 1991
- Launched: 16 January 1993
- Commissioned: 7 January 1995
- Home port: San Diego, California
- Identification: MMSI number: 338830000; Callsign: NACP; Hull number: LSD-49
- Motto: First in Freedom
- Status: in active service
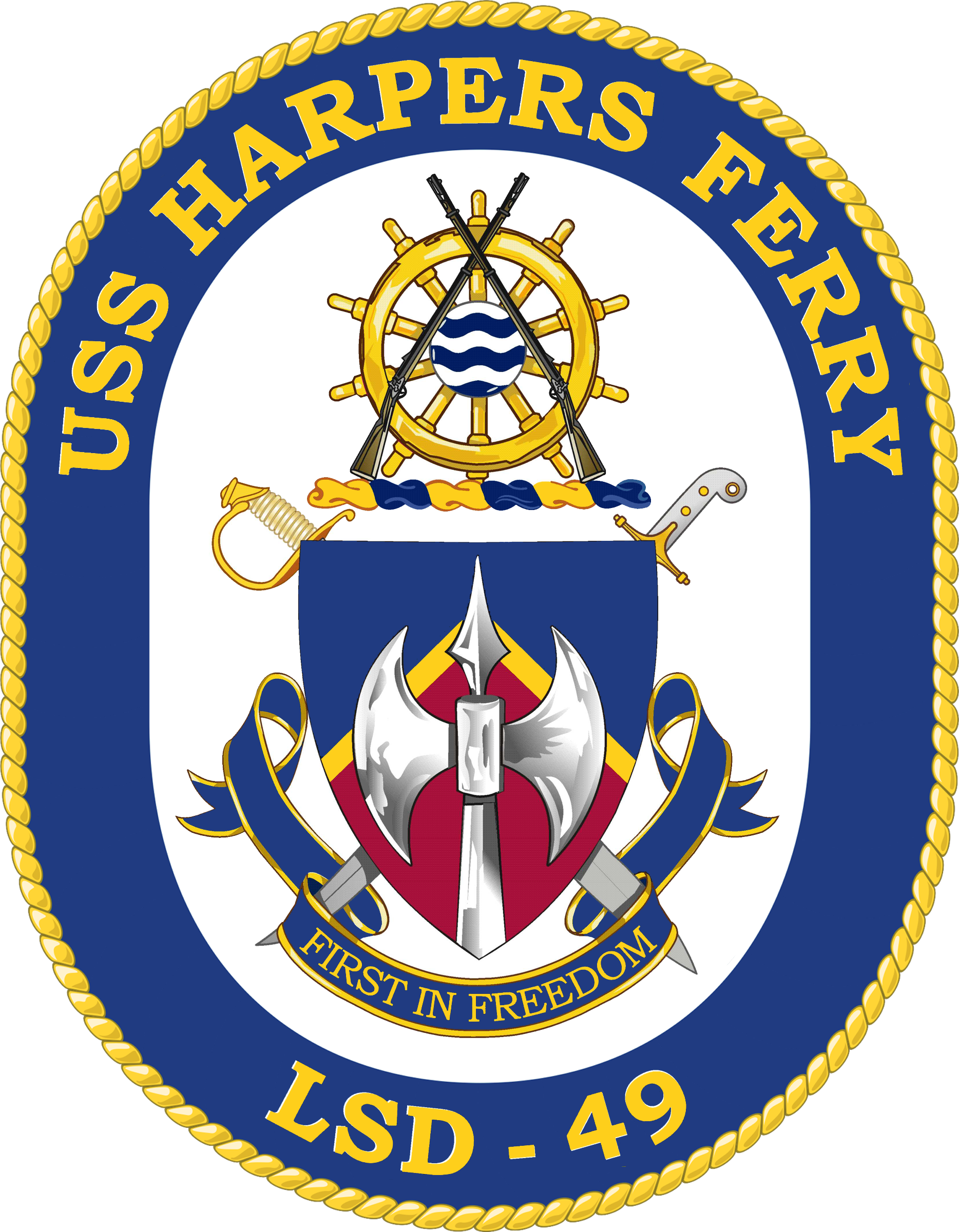
- Badge

General characteristics
- Class & type: Harpers Ferry-class dock landing ship
- Displacement: 11,604 tons (light); 16,601 tons (full)
- Length: 610 ft (190 m)
- Beam: 84 ft (26 m)
- Draft: 21 ft (6.4 m)
- Propulsion: Four Colt Industries, 16-cylinder diesel engines, with two shafts, 33,000 shp (25,000 kW)
- Speed: over 20 knots (37 km/h; 23 mph)
- Boats & landing craft carried: 2 × Landing Craft Air Cushion (LCACs)
- Complement: 22 officers, 397 enlisted men; Marine detachment: 402 + 102 surge
- Armament: 2 × 25 mm Mk 38 rapid-fire cannon; 2 × 20 mm Phalanx CIWS mounts; 2 × Rolling Airframe Missile launchers; 6 × 0.5 in (12.7 mm) M2HB machine guns

USS Harpers Ferry (LSD-49) is the lead ship of her class of landing ship dock of the United States Navy. This warship was named for the town of Harpers Ferry, West Virginia, which, because of the U.S. arsenal there, was an important location during the Civil War. USS Harpers Ferry is assigned to the Navy's "Amphibious Group 1". The homeport of Harpers Ferry is at San Diego County, California. Harpers Ferry was previously stationed at the American Naval Base in Sasebo, Nagasaki, Japan before she was relieved in 2011 by USS Germantown.

Harpers Ferry's keel was laid down on 15 April 1991, at the Avondale Shipyards in New Orleans. The ship was launched on 16 January 1993. The vessel was commissioned on 7 January 1995.

== Operational history ==
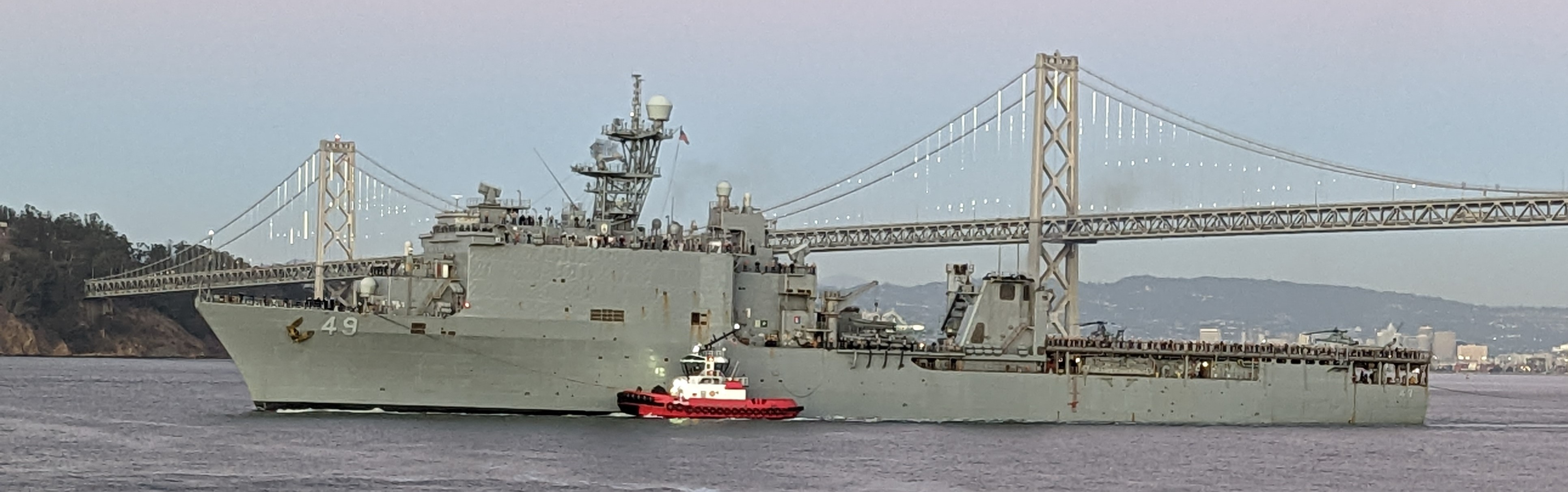
Harpers Ferry sailing near San Francisco, 2022

On 1 September 2002, Harpers Ferry relieved Germantown as a forward-deployed warship based in Japan. In 2011, the two ships exchanged places again with Harpers Ferry returning to San Diego, California as its homeport.

Following the Cyclone Nargis disaster in Burma in 2008, and during the following "Operation Caring Response" humanitarian aid mission to Burma, Harpers Ferry steamed in Burmese waters from 13 May to 5 June, waiting for the Burmese junta government to allow American aid to be taken to its citizens. During this operation, she was a part of USS Essex's expeditionary strike group, which also included Juneau and the guided missile destroyer Mustin, However, in early June, with permission to enter Burmese airspace and land areas still not forthcoming from the Burmese government, it was decided to withdraw this aid mission and to return this Naval Task Group back to its previously scheduled operations.

In October 2009, Harpers Ferry participated in humanitarian rescue operations in the Pangasinan province, of the Philippines, following the impact of Typhoon Parma (Pepeng) that caused serious flooding.

In early April 2010, the ship participated in the recovery efforts of the sunken Republic of Korea Navy ship ROKS Cheonan.

This ship was one of several participating in disaster relief after the 2011 Tōhoku earthquake and tsunami.

In December 2020 the U.S. Navy's Report to Congress on the Annual Long-Range Plan for Construction of Naval Vessels stated that the ship was planned to be placed Out of Commission in Reserve in 2024.

In April 2024, the ship participated in the Multilateral Maritime Exercise as part of Exercise Balikatan 39–2024. The maritime exercise involved ship contingents from the Philippine Navy, the United States Navy and the French Navy. She participated alongside BRP Ramon Alcaraz (PS-16), BRP Davao del Sur (LD-602), USS Somerset (LPD-25), and FS Vendémiaire (F734).
