= BRP Davao del Sur =

Philippine Navy amphibious transport ship

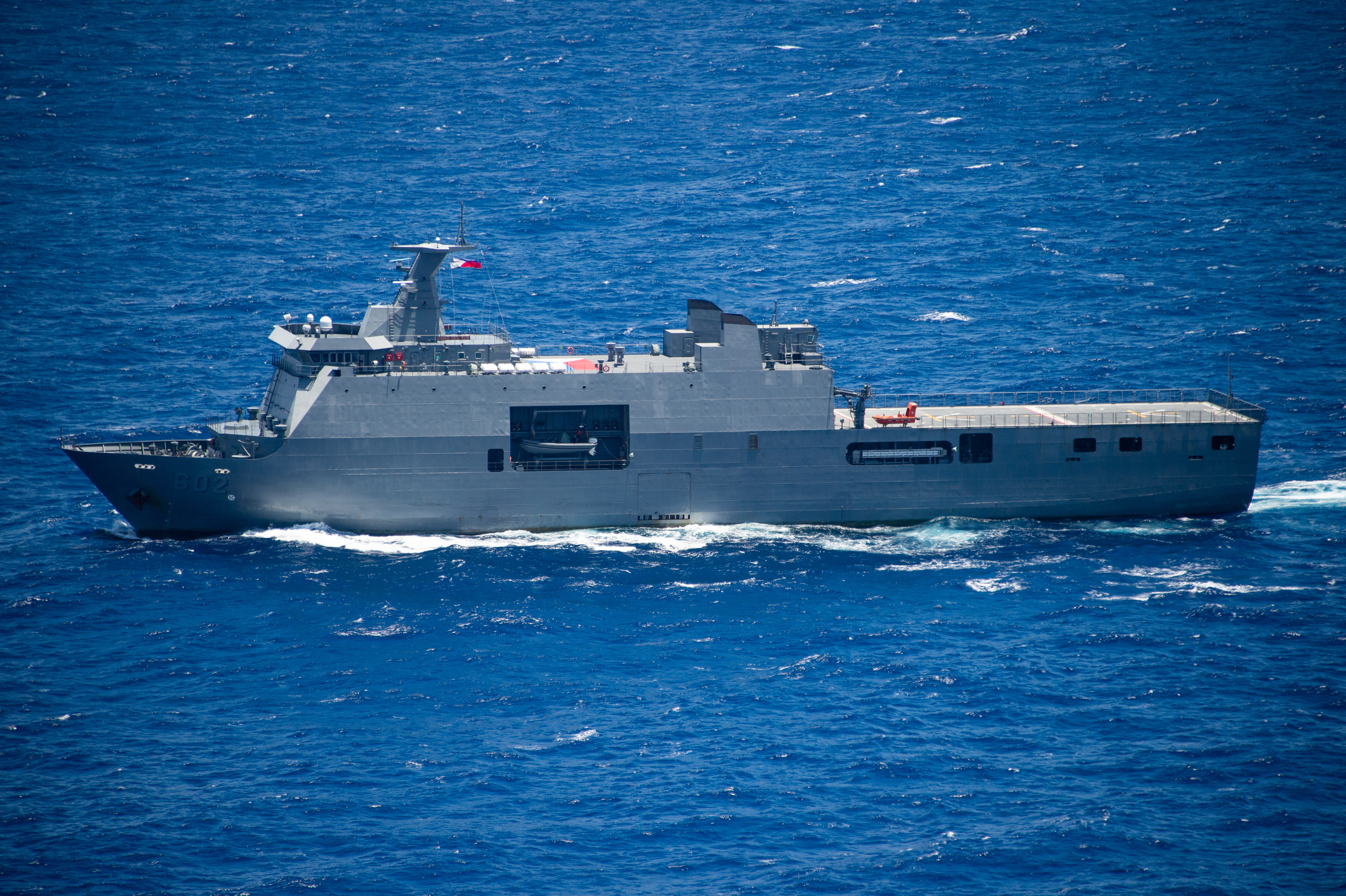
- BRP Davao del Sur at Exercise RIMPAC 2018.

Philippines
- Name: BRP Davao del Sur
- Namesake: Province of Davao del Sur
- Ordered: 29 August 2013
- Builder: PT PAL Indonesia
- Laid down: 5 June 2015
- Launched: 29 September 2016
- Commissioned: 31 May 2017
- Home port: Naval Base Subic
- Identification: LD-602; IMO number: 9745641; MMSI number: 525100362; Callsign: YBRV2
- Status: In active service
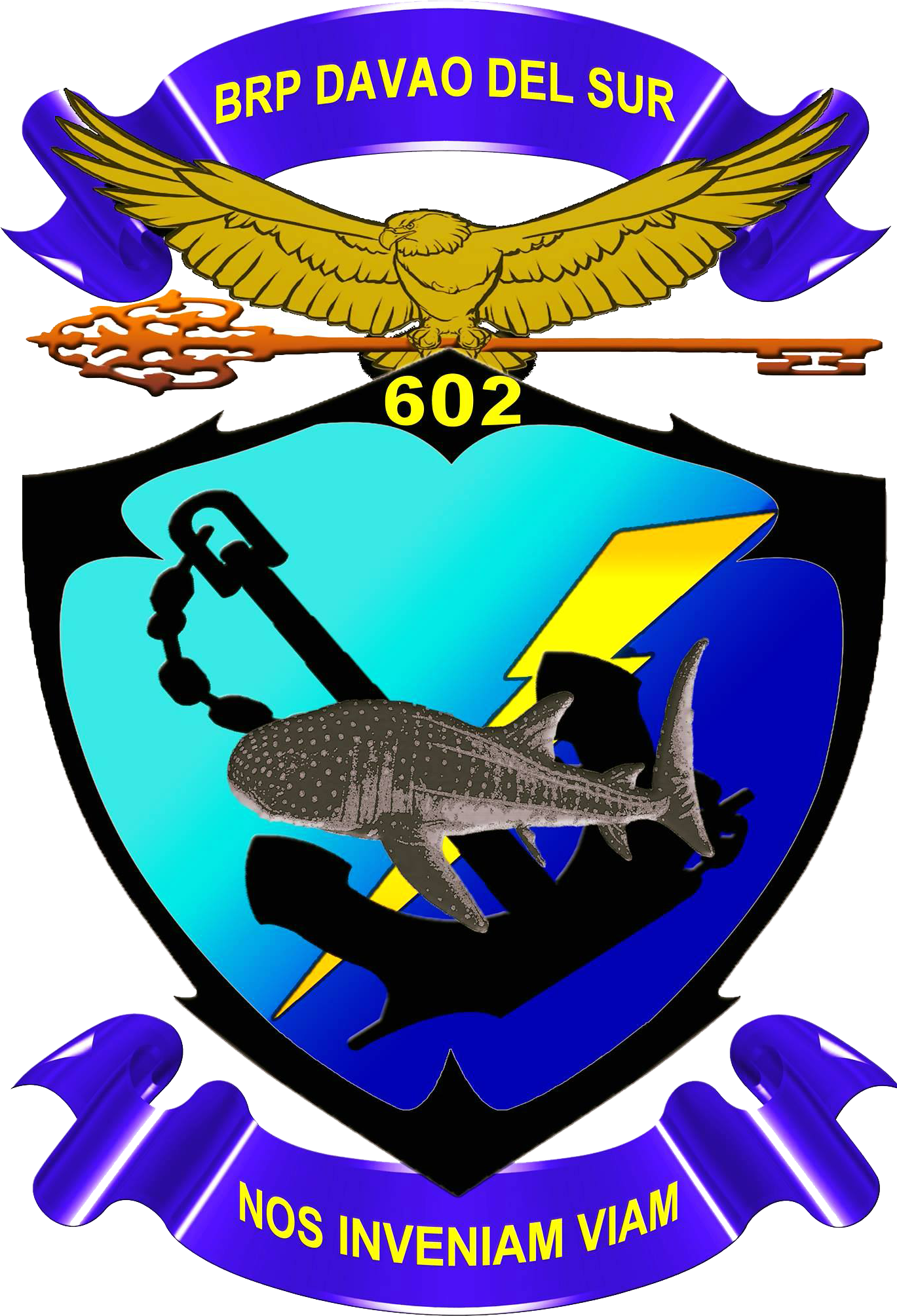
- Badge

General characteristics
- Class & type: Tarlac-class landing platform dock
- Displacement: Standard: 7,200 tons; Full load: 11,583 tons
- Length: 123 m (403.5 ft)
- Beam: 21.8 m (71.5 ft)
- Draft: 5 m (16.4 ft)
- Installed power: 1 x MAN D2842 LE301 diesel generator
- Propulsion: Combined diesel and diesel (CODAD) arrangement: 2 × MAN-STX 8L27/38 diesel engines, each producing 3,915 bhp (2,920 kW)
- Speed: Cruising: 13 kn (24.1 km/h; 15 mph); Maximum: 16 kn (29.6 km/h; 18.4 mph)
- Range: 9360 nmi (17334.7 km)
- Endurance: 30 days
- Boats & landing craft carried: 2 × LCU or LCM at floodable well decks; 2 × RHIB or LCVP at boat davits
- Capacity: 500 troops plus associated vehicles and equipment
- Complement: 121 crew
- Sensors & processing systems: Furuno X-band & S-band navigation radars; Combat management system (planned); Surface search radar (planned); Air search radar (planned); Electro-Optical Fire Control System (planned)
- Electronic warfare & decoys: Electronic Warfare Suite (planned)
- Armament: 1 × 76mm main gun on the foredeck (planned); 2 × 25mm secondary guns, one each on port and starboard sides (planned); 6 × .50cal (12.7mm) guns
- Aircraft carried: 1 × AW109E Power naval helicopter
- Aviation facilities: Hangar for 1 medium (10-ton) helicopter; Flight deck for 2 medium (10-ton) helicopters

BRP Davao del Sur (LD-602) is the second ship of the Tarlac-class landing platform dock of the Philippine Navy. She is the second ship to be named after the Philippine province of Davao del Sur, one of the main provinces in Mindanao in Southern Philippines. She was launched on 29 September 2016 and was commissioned into service on 31 May 2017.

== Operational history ==
During the second week of May 2018, the BRP Davao del Sur participated in the Balikatan Exercise with US Forces together with the BRP Ramon Alcaraz (PS-16).

On the third week of May 2018, the BRP Davao del Sur participated in the commemorative activities of the first anniversary of the renaming of the Philippine Rise off the coast of Eastern Luzon. Among the activities that were done on board the ship were:

- President Rodrigo Duterte signed the proclamation declaring portions of the Philippine Rise as a marine protected area and then led the send off for a team of Filipino scientists on a research mission to the Philippine Rise.
- A Ceremonial Flag Raising ceremony participated by military and other government personnel was also made.

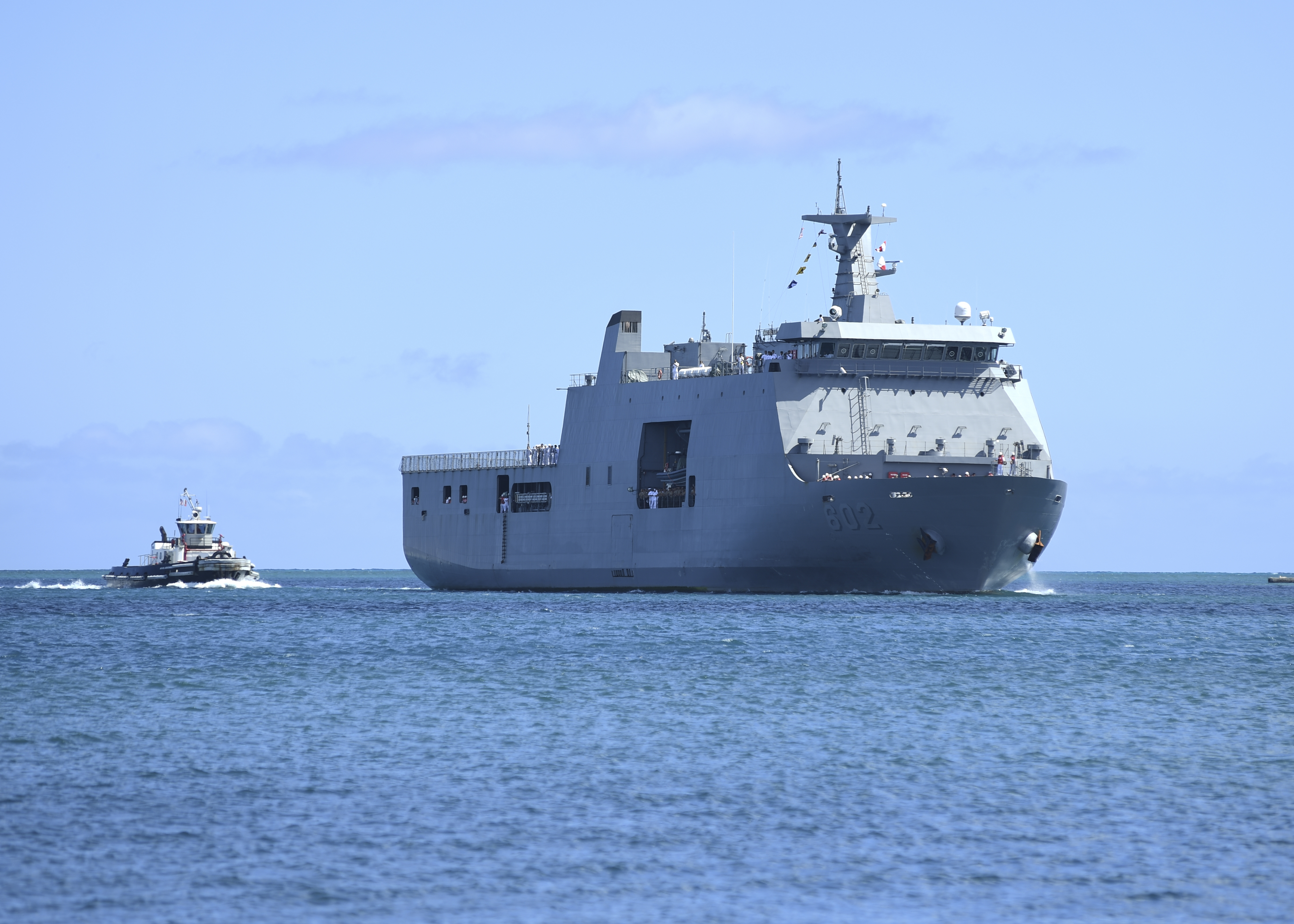
BRP Davao del Sur steams into Joint Base Pearl Harbor–Hickam at the start of RIMPAC 2018.

BRP Davao Del Sur was deployed with BRP Andrés Bonifacio (PS-17) to RIMPAC 2018, starting their voyage on June 11, 2018 and rendezvousing with ships from several regional navies and arriving at Pearl Harbor on June 27, 2018.

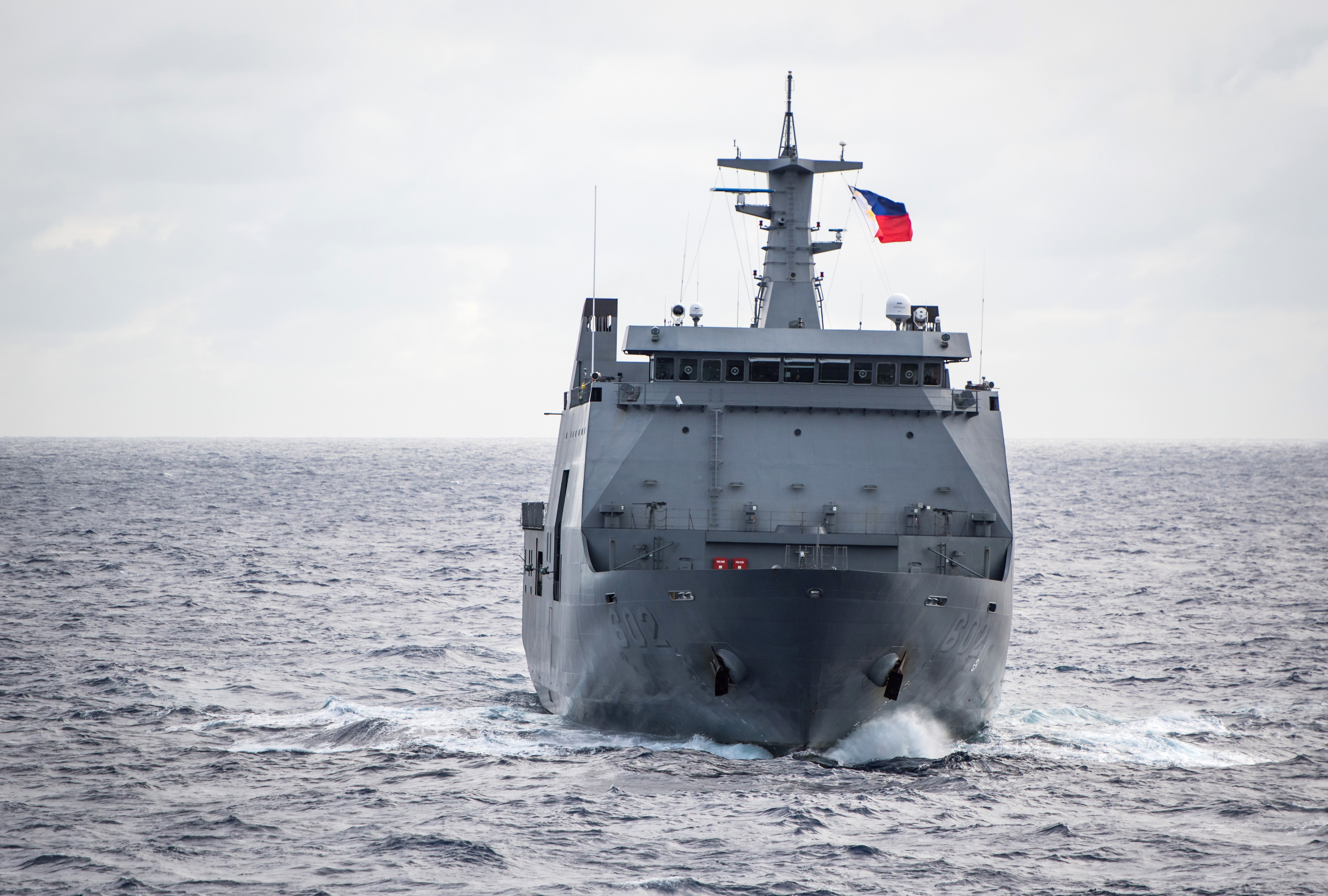
BRP Davao del Sur during Sea Phase of RIMPAC 2018.

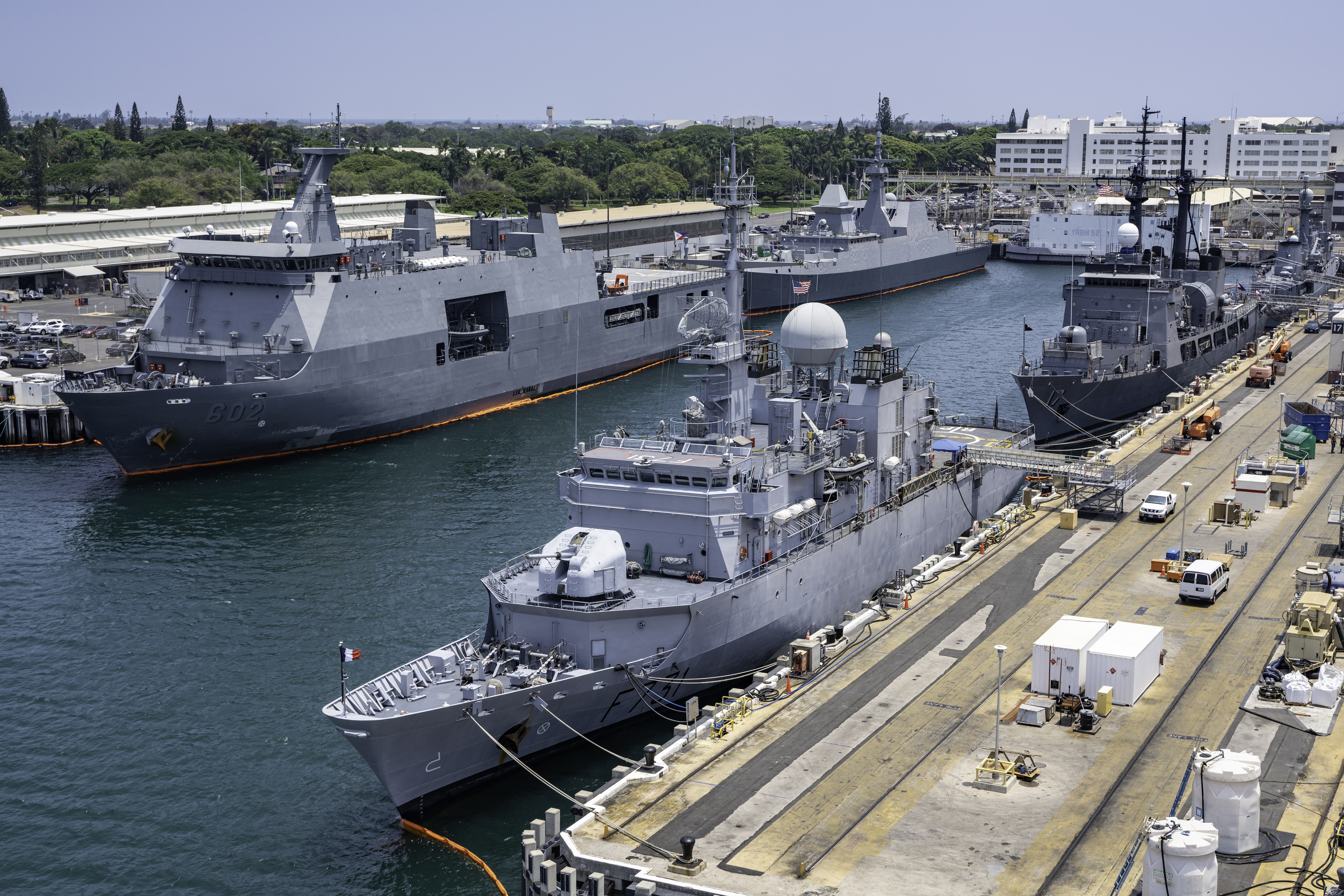
BRP Davao Del Sur berthed in Joint Base Pearl Harbor Hickam for RIMPAC 2018

Among the events the ship participated at RIMPAC were:

- An "Open Ship" one-day Guided Ship Tour for the public where students of the Naval Officers Basic Course performed a Cultural Performance for the ship's visitors.
- The Sand Volleyball Tournament where the ship was declared the overall winner among the 49 teams from 25 nations that participated.

In June 2019, the ship transported the Marine Battalion Landing Team (MBLT)-3 from Zamboanga City to its new assignment in Palawan. Along the way, the BRP Davao del Sur conducted a Meeting Procedure and Photo Exercise with the Escort Flotilla One of the Japan Maritime Self Defense Force off the coast of Cagayan de Tawi-Tawi in the Sulu Sea. The Japanese ships consisted of the JS Izumo (DDH-183), JS Murasame and JS Akebono.

The BRP Davao del Sur was the 1st Philippine Navy vessel to participate in Russia's Navy Day festivities that occurred on 28 July 2019.

In August 2019, the ship and its 300-man Contingent sailed from Vladivostok, Russia to meet up at sea with the BRP Conrado Yap (PS-30) in South Korea for a Group Sail back to the Philippines. Both ships were then given Arrival Honors at the Manila South Harbor which included a Meeting Procedure at sea with the BRP Emilio Jacinto (PS-35).

In April 2024, the ship participated in the Multilateral Maritime Exercise as part of Exercise Balikatan 39-2024. The maritime exercise involved ship contingents from the Philippine Navy, the United States Navy and the French Navy. She participated alongside BRP Ramon Alcaraz (PS-16), USS Harpers Ferry (LSD-49), USS Somerset (LPD-25), and FS Vendémiaire (F734).

== See also ==
- List of ships of the Philippine Navy
