= BRP Ramon Alcaraz =

Philippine Navy patrol ship

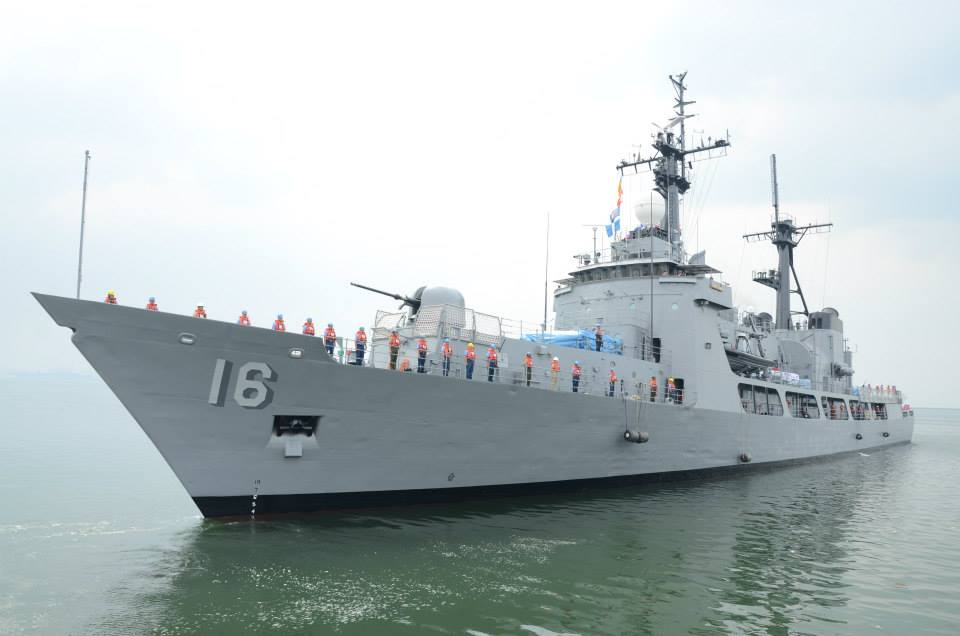
- BRP Ramon Alcaraz before the installation of the Mk. 38 Mod. 2 25 mm autocannons.

History

United States
- Name: USCGC Dallas
- Builder: Avondale Shipyards
- Launched: October 1, 1966
- Commissioned: March 11, 1968
- Decommissioned: March 30, 2012
- Identification: WHEC-716
- Fate: Transferred to Philippine Navy

Philippines
- Name: BRP Ramon Alcaraz
- Namesake: Ramon Abacan Alcaraz
- Acquired: May 22, 2012
- Commissioned: November 22, 2013
- Maiden voyage: June 10, 2013
- Identification: Pennant number: PS-41 (2026 - present), PS-16 (2019-2026), FF-16 (2013-2019); MMSI number: 367270000; Callsign: 4DCA3
- Nickname(s): BRP Monching
- Status: In active service
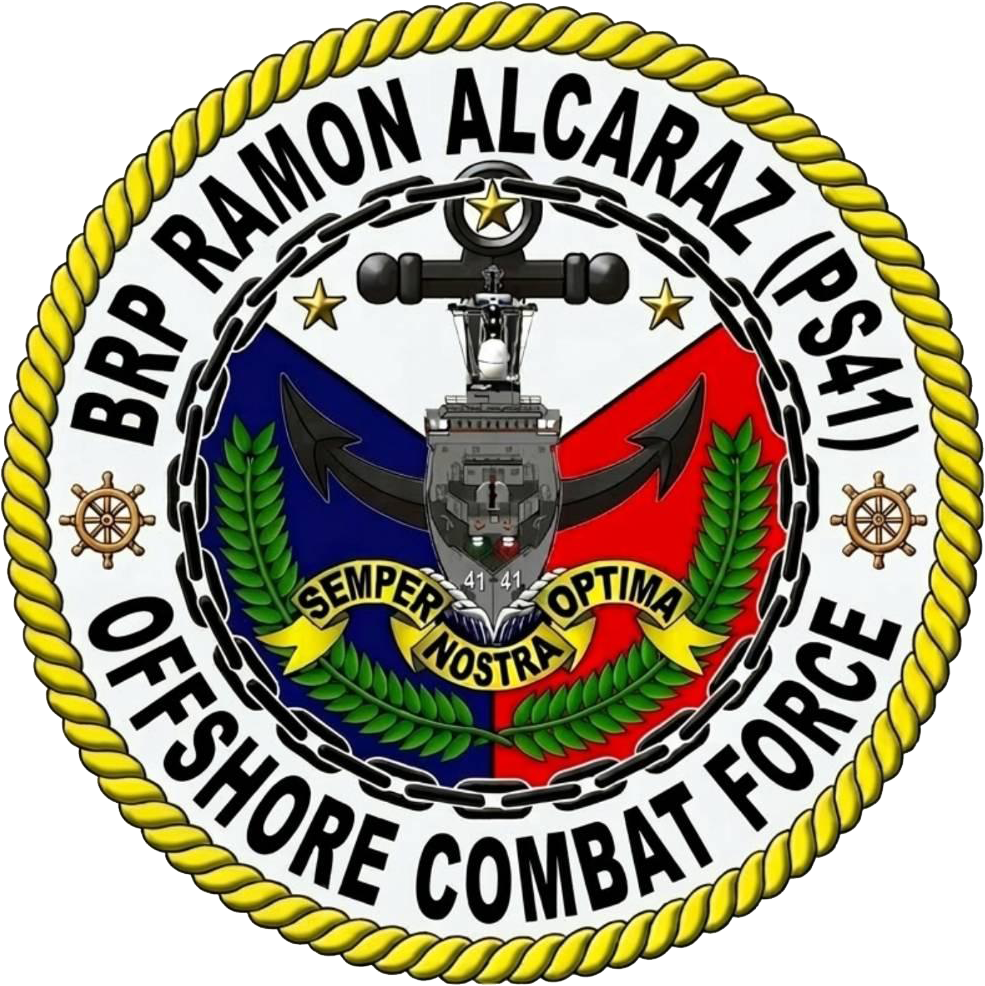
- Badge

General characteristics
- Class & type: Gregorio del Pilar-class patrol ship
- Displacement: 3,250 tons
- Length: 378 ft (115.2 m)
- Beam: 43 ft (13.1 m)
- Draft: 15 ft (4.6 m)
- Propulsion: Combined diesel or gas (CODOG) arrangement: 2 × Fairbanks-Morse 38TD8-1/8-12 12-cylinder diesel engines, each producing 3,500 shp (2,610 kW); 2 × Pratt & Whittney FT4A-6 gas turbines, each producing 18,000 shp (13,400 kW)
- Speed: 29 kn (53.7 km/h; 33.4 mph) via twin gas-turbines
- Range: 12,500 nmi (23,200 km; 14,400 mi) @ 12 kn (22 kph; 14 mph) via diesel
- Endurance: 45 days
- Boats & landing craft carried: 2 × RHIBs
- Complement: 80
- Sensors & processing systems: CMS: Naval Shield Baseline 2 integrated combat management system; Main radar: SeaGIRAFFE AMB (USN designation: AN/SPS-77) multi-role 3D air-&-surface search-&-track naval radar; Secondary radars: SharpEye Mk.2 X-band (25kW) & S-band (200W) solid-state pulse-Doppler navigation & surface-search radars; Fire Control: USN Mk.92 Mod.1 fire-control system by Sperry; Optronic sensors: SeaFLIR 230 color TV camera, low-light camera, thermal imager, LRF, laser pointer, NVIS; Sonar: ELAC Hunter 2.0 underkeel dome sonar
- Electronic warfare & decoys: 2 × BAE Systems' Mark 36 SRBOC (Super Rapid Blooming Offboard Countermeasures) mortar-type countermeasures dispensing system; RESM: Elbit Systems' NS9003A (expected)
- Armament: 1 × Oto-Melara 76/62C Compatto/Compact DP autocannon on a USN Mk.75 mount; 2 × USN Mk.38 Mod.2 25mm autocannons (amidships: port and starboard); 6 x M2 Browning 12.7mm (50caliber) heavy machine guns
- Armor: CBRNE defense system
- Aircraft carried: 1 × AW109E Power light multi-role naval helicopter
- Aviation facilities: helideck; hangar: partly-fixed and partly-retractable
- Notes: steel hull, aluminium superstructure

BRP Ramon Alcaraz (PS-41) is the second ship of the Gregorio del Pilar-class patrol ships of the Philippine Navy. From 1968 to 2012, she was known as USCGC Dallas and served the United States Coast Guard as a high endurance cutter. She was decommissioned on 30 March 2012 and acquired by the Philippines under the Excess Defense Articles and the Foreign Assistance Act.

She is named after Commodore Ramon Alcaraz, a Filipino Naval officer and World War II hero best known for receiving a Silver Star for heroism and gallantry during World War II. He is also known for being one of the first officers of the Armed Forces of the Philippines to criticize the Marcos dictatorship, and for the proposal which made him the father of the Philippine Marine Corps.

In 2012, she was originally designated as "PF-16" i.e. patrol frigate. In mid-2016, the Navy adopted a new code designation system, leading to her being re-designated as "FF-16" i.e. frigate. In 2019 February, the Navy downgraded the status of the entire class from frigate to patrol ship and redesignated her as "PS-16". The ship, together with its two other sisterships, were again re-designated in March 2026, with BRP Ramon Alcaraz given the hull number PS-41.

== Design ==
The ship was designed with a high level of habitability and provides fairly comfortable accommodations, including air conditioning.

=== Propulsion ===
The Ramon Alcaraz employs the shipboard application of aircraft gas turbine jet engines with the use of controllable pitch propellers. She is equipped with two 18,000 horsepower (13,000 kW) Pratt & Whitney gas turbines and can propel the ship at speeds up to 29 knots (54 km/h; 33 mph). The Ramon Alcaraz also has two 3,500 horsepower (2,600 kW) Fairbanks-Morse diesel engines, capable of driving the ship economically at 12 knots (22 km/h; 14 mph) for up to 12,500 nmi (23,200 km; 14,400 mi) without refueling. A retractable/rotatable bow propulsion unit provides manoeuvrability in tight situations.

=== Armament ===
Prior to turn-over to the Philippine Navy, the ship was armed with a Mk.75 Oto Melara 76 mm Compact main gun, two Mk.38 25 mm Bushmaster chain guns at midships, and a Phalanx CIWS system aft. The CIWS and chain guns were removed prior to its turn-over, with the Mk.75 gun remaining.

The Philippine Navy then purchased two new Mk.38 Mod.2 25 mm Bushmaster Autocannons to replace the mounts removed by the US Coast Guard. These were already installed as of January 25, 2015.

=== Flight support ===
Ramon Alcaraz has a flight deck and hangar capable of handling helicopters.

A newly acquired naval helicopter (an AgustaWestland AW109 Power) made its shipboard deployment on May 21, 2014.

=== Modernization ===
The Philippine Navy plans to modernize the entire ship of the class, with an initial program to upgrade the ship's sensors, and another program to improve its weapon systems.

Several systems were acquired through US Foreign Military Sales (FMS) and Foreign Military Financing (FMF), which includes the BAE Systems Mk. 38 Mod. 2 machine gun system (already installed), the SAAB AN/SPS-77 Sea Giraffe AMB 3D air/surface search radar, and the FLIR Systems SeaFLIR 230 Electro-Optical/Infra-Red Camera.

Meanwhile, the Philippine Navy will launch a program to acquire, install and integrate several other sensors into the ship, as part of the Horizon 2 phase of the Revised AFP Modernization Program. Among those to be acquired are new Combat Management System (CMS), Hull Mounted Sonar (HMS), and a Radar Electronic Support Measures (R-ESM).

Future upgrades are planned to install defensive and offensive missile systems, as well as torpedo weapon system, although funding is still being secured and might only be included in the next phase of the Navy's modernization program.

In 2020 October 14, Navy chief Giovanni Carlo Bacordo revealed the completion of the 3D modeling program for the entire ship class' cabling systems to be used for their electronic upgrades (CMS + 4 sensors), indicating the project is at least running despite the COVID-19 pandemic.

== History ==
=== US Coast Guard service and transfer to the Philippine Navy ===
The ship was first launched in 1968 and served for decades as the U.S. Coast Guard Cutter Dallas (WHEC-716) before being given to the Philippines.

The ship was scheduled to be transferred to the Philippines as an excess defense article through the Foreign Assistance Act via a "hot transfer" in May 2012. The Dallas was formally decommissioned on 30 March 2012, and the US Coast Guard removed the ship's guns and other equipment.

On 6 May 2012 during the 70th commemoration of the Fall of Bataan, President Benigno Aquino III announced the naming of the ex-USCGC Dallas to BRP Ramon Alcaraz (PF-16) in honor of the World War II hero and officer of the Philippine Navy. Commodore Ramon "Monching" Alcaraz commanded one of the Philippine Offshore Patrol's Q-boat Q-112 Abra during World War II which shot down 3 Japanese aircraft.

The ex-Dallas was formally transferred to the Philippine government on 22 May 2012 during a ceremony at the Federal Law Enforcement Training Center Pier Papa in North Charleston, South Carolina. The ship was turned over to its Filipino crew, with Capt. Ernesto Baldovino as its first commanding officer. The ship's crew had been in the US for several weeks prior to the transfer for training aboard other Hamilton-class ships operated by the US Coast Guard. Ramon Alcaraz was scheduled to be refitted at the expense of the Philippine Navy prior to sailing to the Philippines. The ship's transfer cost was pegged at Php 450 million (around US$10 million as of 2012), while operation costs will be similar to its sister ship, BRP Gregorio del Pilar. An additional US$5 million was allocated for installation of additional equipment, different from her sister ship Gregorio del Pilar. The ship will have better fire control and weapons systems than Gregorio del Pilar.

The ship was originally expected to leave Charleston, South Carolina for the Philippines in January 2013 but it was delayed. The ship finally departed Charleston harbor at 10:00 AM on 10 June 2013. She reached the Atlantic-side entrance of the Panama Canal and crossed its entire stretch on 17 June. Ramon Alcaraz continued her journey across the Pacific Ocean and was scheduled for port visits at Joint Base Pearl Harbor–Hickam in Hawaii, and at Guam. before reaching Manila by 3 August 2013.

On August 1, 2013, Ramon Alcaraz entered Philippine waters. Her official arrival ceremony was held Subic Bay on August 6. On November 22, 2013, she was commissioned as BRP Ramon Alcaraz (PF-16) at Pier 15 in Manila's South Harbor.

After commissioning, she sailed to Tacloban City to transport about 200 tons of relief goods, water purification systems, and navy personnel who helped with relief efforts following Typhoon Haiyan.

Around mid-2016, the Philippine Navy started calling the ship in its new code designation FF-16, together with its sister ship BRP Gregorio del Pilar which was re-designated as FF-15, and the upcoming BRP Andres Bonifacio designated as FF-17.

In March 2017, the Philippine Navy sent the Ramon Alcaraz to patrol the Benham Rise, which is part of Philippine territorial waters, after a Chinese survey ship was sighted in the area for several days.

=== Middle East and Indian Ocean deployment ===
In January 2020, Naval Task Force (NTF) 82, which was composed of BRP Ramon Alcaraz and the landing dock BRP Davao del Sur, were deployed to the Middle East to repatriate overseas Filipino workers there during the 2019-2020 Persian Gulf crisis between the United States and Iran. The two naval ships arrived in Muscat, Oman on February 6 after a layover in Sri Lanka, but tensions in the Gulf region have already eased by that date and were told by Philippine Navy officials to stay put. They left Oman on April 21 and arrived in Cochin, India on May 6. They picked up some 200,000 pieces of personal protective equipment (PPEs) donated by a Filipino donor who sources masks from India. They also picked up Filipinos stranded by the COVID-19 pandemic.

On the evening of May 7, 2020, a fire broke out in the engine room of the BRP Ramon Alcaraz shortly after it left the port of Cochin, India. The fire, which lasted for 10 minutes, was extinguished by the crew members. Two enlisted men suffered second degree burns and were airlifted to a naval hospital in Cochin for "extensive medical attention". The ship stayed in Cochin for an additional 21 days and, with the help of the US Naval Sea Systems Command, conducted assessment and minor repair to ensure functionality and safety of the propulsion system for the trip back to the Philippines, where additional repairs will be done.

On May 27, 2020, the two ships left Cochin after the minor repairs were completed. They arrived in Colombo, Sri Lanka on May 29 to pick up 12 stranded Filipino overseas workers and tourists. They left the port of Colombo midnight of May 31 for their voyage back to the Philippines. The two ships joined the country in celebrating its 122nd Independence Day as both entered Manila Bay on Friday, June 12.

Philippine Navy chief, VAdm. Giovanni Bacordo, said the BRP Ramon Alcaraz underwent major checks and repairs from the fire damage since it arrived last June 12. The repairs were conducted by US Naval Sea Systems Command personnel, local contractors, and crew members aboard. When the repairs were completed, the ship conducted sea trials from September 8 to 9, 2020 off the waters of Zambales according to Navy public affairs officer Lt. Cdr. Maria Christina Roxas. The sea trial conducted all the systems and machinery tests that were probably affected during the fire incident. The BRP Ramon Alcaraz was deemed ready for deployment by Philippine Navy following its successful sea trials.

== Notable operational deployments ==
=== Exercises ===
- The ship, together with its sister ship BRP Gregorio del Pilar (PS-15) participated in joint naval maneuvers as part of CARAT 2014 Philippines from June 26 to July 1, 2014. It was scheduled to conduct exercises on gunnery, combined air, surface, anti-submarine operations at sea.
- The ship, together with a naval AW109E helicopter (serial PNH-431), traveled to Northern Australia as a major participant in the KAKADU 2014 Multi-lateral Naval Exercises hosted by the Australian Defence Force from August 25 to September 12, 2014. The ship's crew also participated in boarding training with the Australian Navy before the actual sea-phase of the exercises.
- During the first week of May 2018, the BRP Ramon Alcaraz participated in the Exercise Balikatan 34-2018 with US Forces together with the BRP Davao del Sur (LD-602).
- In the third week of May 2018, the BRP Ramon Alcaraz conducted joint training with HMAS Anzac (FFH 150) around the waters of Negros Island for Exercise Lumbas 2018, a joint Maritime Training Activity between the Royal Australian Navy (RAN) and the Philippine Navy.
- In the second week of July 2018, the BRP Ramon Alcaraz participated in the Maritime Training Activity (MTA) Sama Sama at Naval Station Ernesto Ogbinar in Pampanga with the US Navy (USN) along with the BRP Tarlac (LD-601) Landing Platform Dock. The USN sent the USNS Millinocket (T-EPF-3) Transport Ship, USNS Salvor (T-ARS 52) Salvage Ship and a P-8 Poseidon Aircraft for the exercise.
- During the third week of July 2018, the BRP Ramon Alcaraz participated in a Maritime Security Activity (MSA) with the Royal Australian Navy (RAN) in the waters around Palawan along with the BRP Simeon Castro (PC-374). The RAN sent the vessels HMAS Ararat and HMAS Wollongong for the activity which consists of Ship Training Activities, Maritime Patrols, Maritime Security Threat discussions, among others.
- From August to September 2018, the BRP Ramon Alcaraz participated again in KAKADU 2018 held in Darwin, Australia which is a biennial event and is the largest maritime exercise hosted by Australia. The 2018 version of the exercise included 3,000 personnel, 23 ships, 1 submarine and 21 aircraft from 28 nations. The Alcaraz participated in various maritime activities there including firing its Oto Melara 76 mm caliber main gun in a live fire exercise.
- In May 2019, the ship participated in a 10-day coordinated Sea Patrol and Exercise in the Sulu Sea and Celebes Sea with the KRI Pandrong (801) of the Indonesian Navy. The exercise aimed to improve interoperability and strengthen the capability to secure the seas.
- In April 2024, the ship participated in the Multilateral Maritime Exercise as part of Exercise Balikatan 39–2024. The maritime exercise involved ship contingents from the Philippine Navy, the United States Navy and the French Navy. She participated alongside BRP Davao del Sur (LD-602), USS Harpers Ferry (LSD-49), USS Somerset (LPD-25), and FS Vendémiaire (F734).

=== Search and rescue ===
- In February 2019, the BRP Ramon Alcaraz fetched two Filipino Fishermen from Parola Island in the Southeast Asia Sea who were earlier reported to have jumped from FV Thanksgiving 5 after experiencing maltreatment from the head of the crew. The Fishermen were then rescued by the Vietnam People's Navy and later bought to Parola Island. The Fishermen were able to return safely to their families in Occidental Mindoro.

== Gallery ==
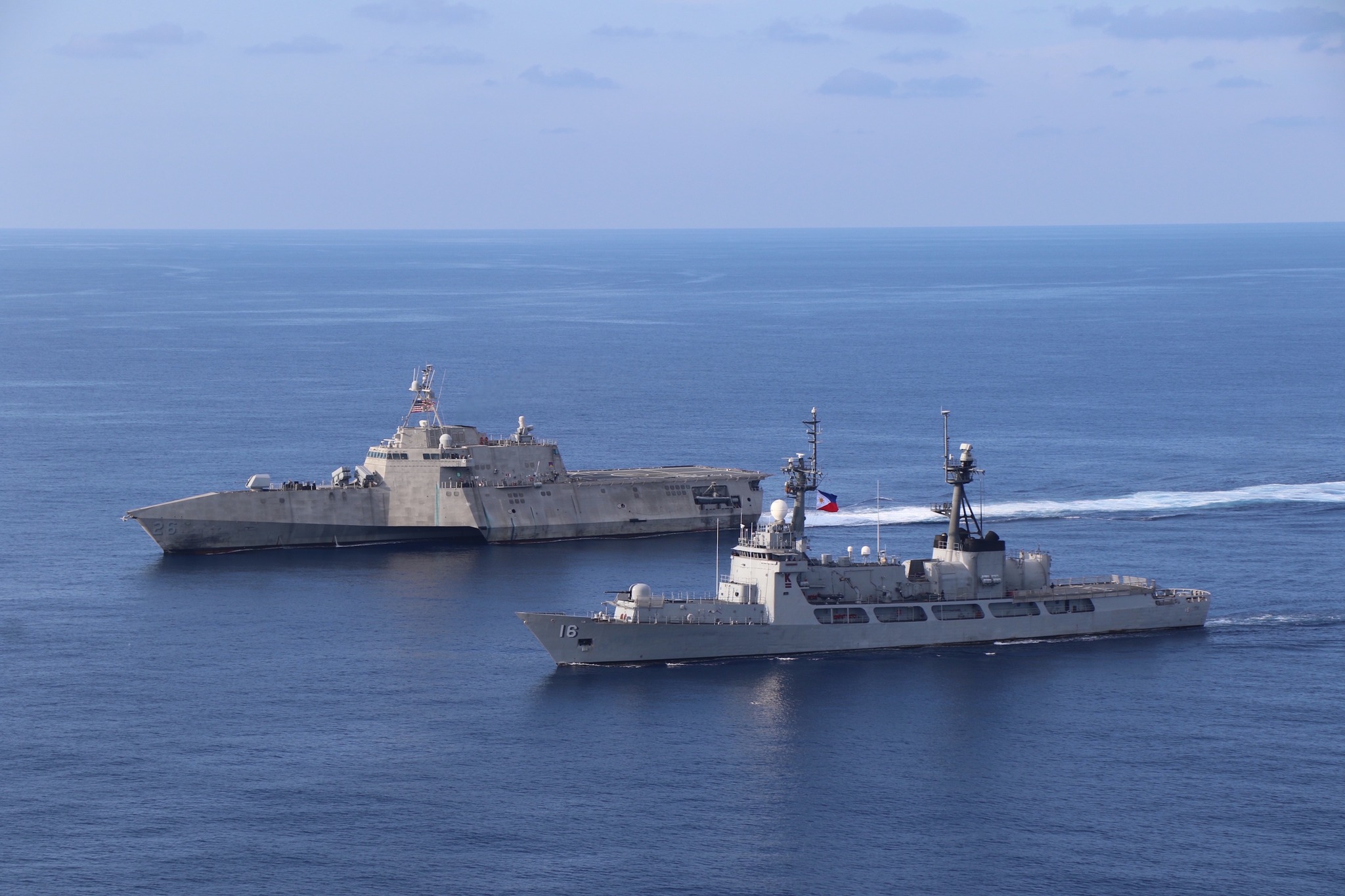
Independence-class littoral combat ship USS Mobile (LCS 26) conducts a Maritime Cooperative Activity with Philippine Navy's Gregorio del Pilar-class patrol ship, BRP Ramon Alcaraz (PS 16), in the South China Sea, July 31, 2024.

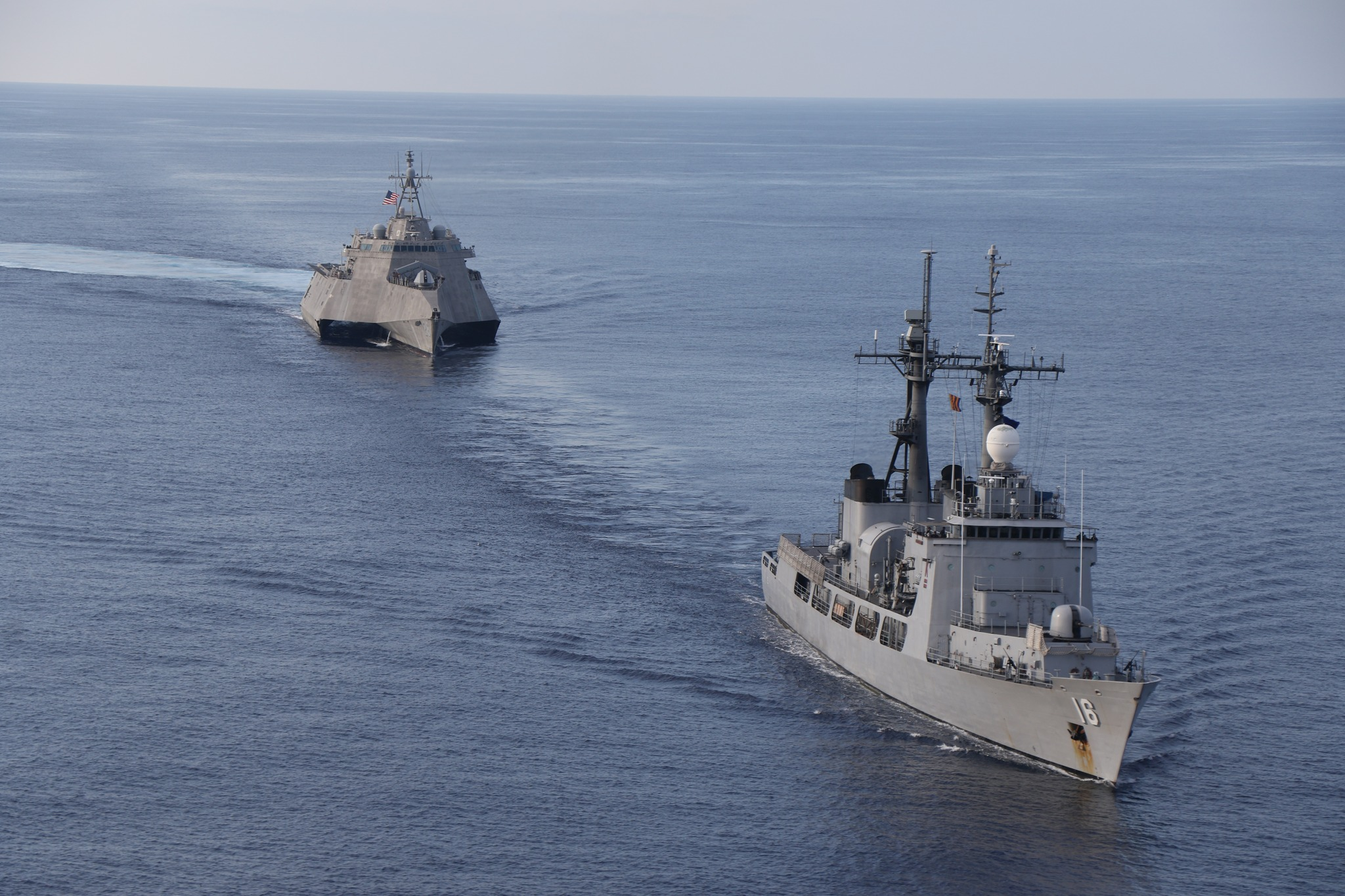
Independence-class littoral combat ship USS Mobile (LCS 26) sailing with BRP Ramon Alcaraz (PS 16).

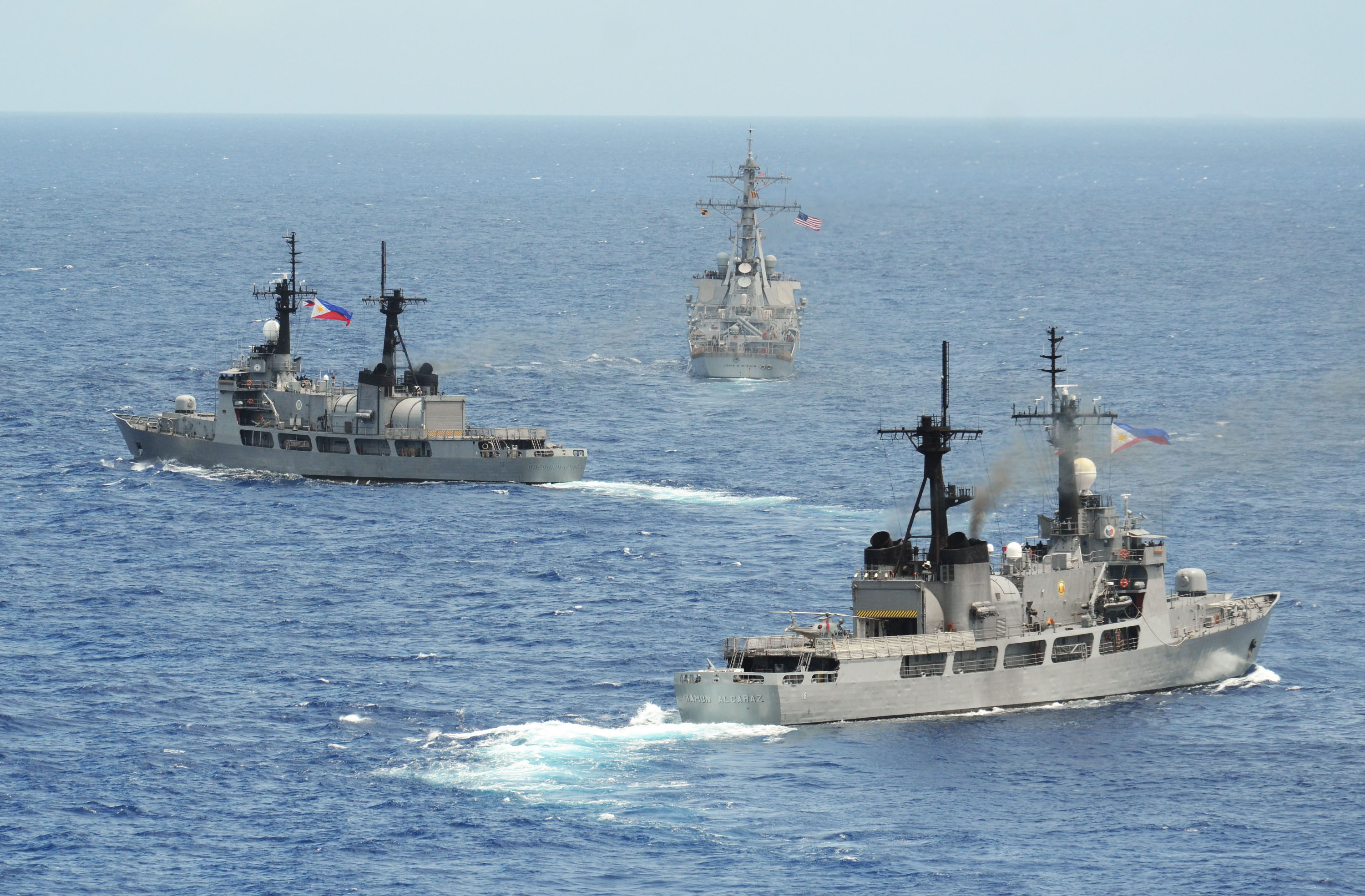
BRP Ramon Alcaraz (PF-16) with BRP Gregorio del Pilar and US Navy USS John S. McCain during CARAT Philippines 2014.

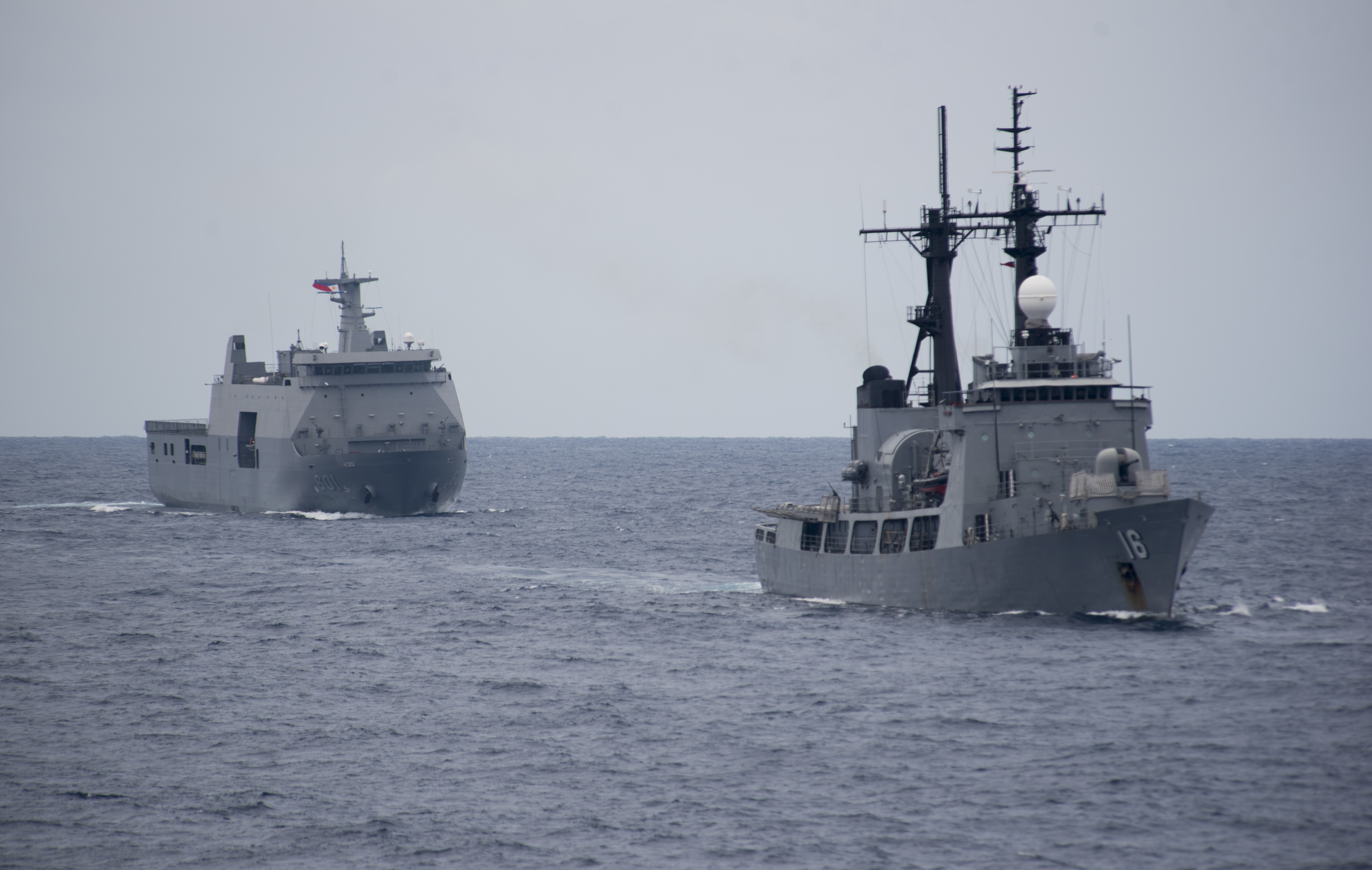
BRP Tarlac (LD-601) and BRP Ramon Alcaraz (PS-16) sail in formation during the at-sea portion of Maritime Training Activity (MTA) Sama Sama 2018.

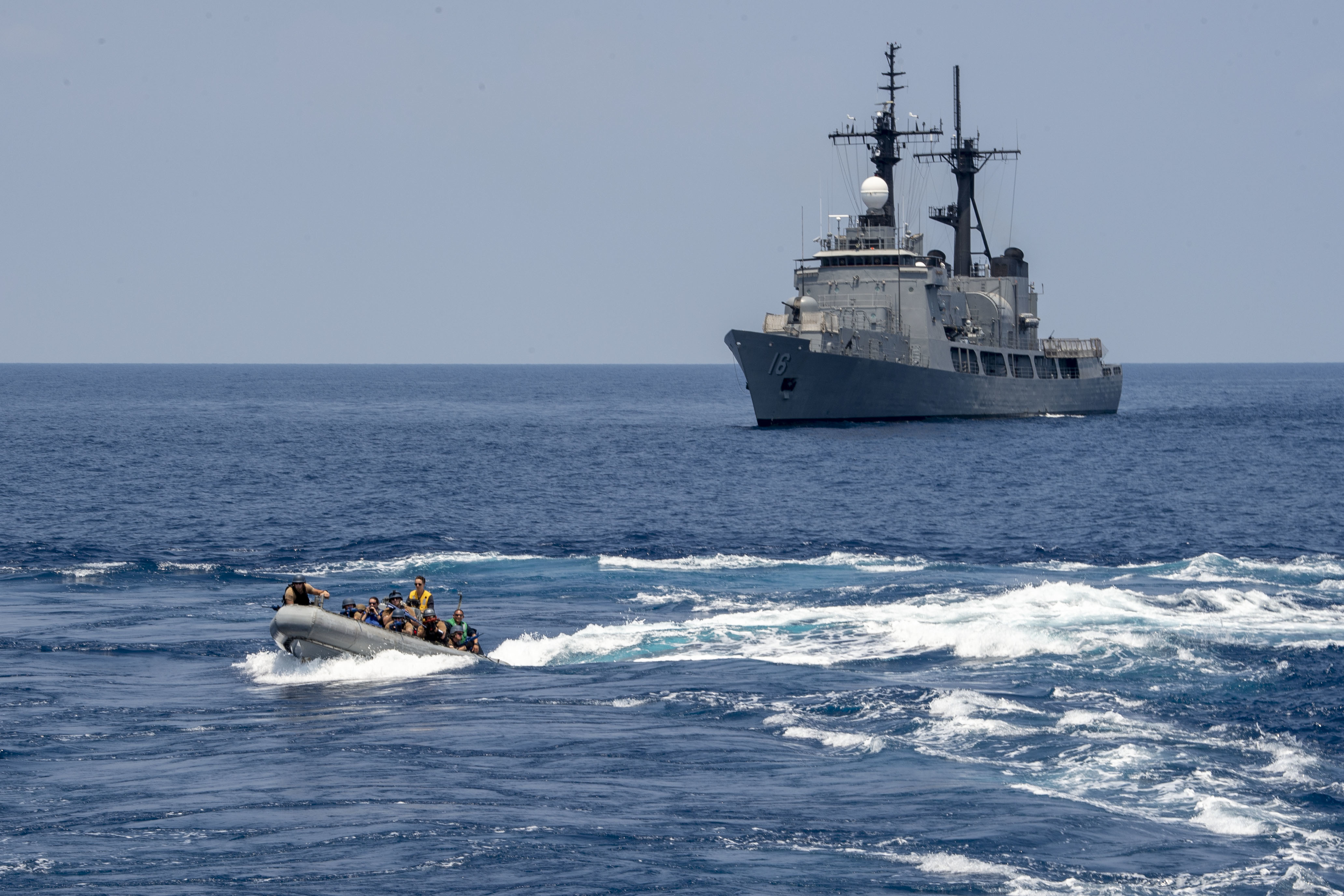
BRP Ramon Alcaraz in VBSS operations during Balikatan 2019.

== See also ==
- List of ships of the Philippine Navy
