= French frigate Vendémiaire =

1992 Floréal-class frigate

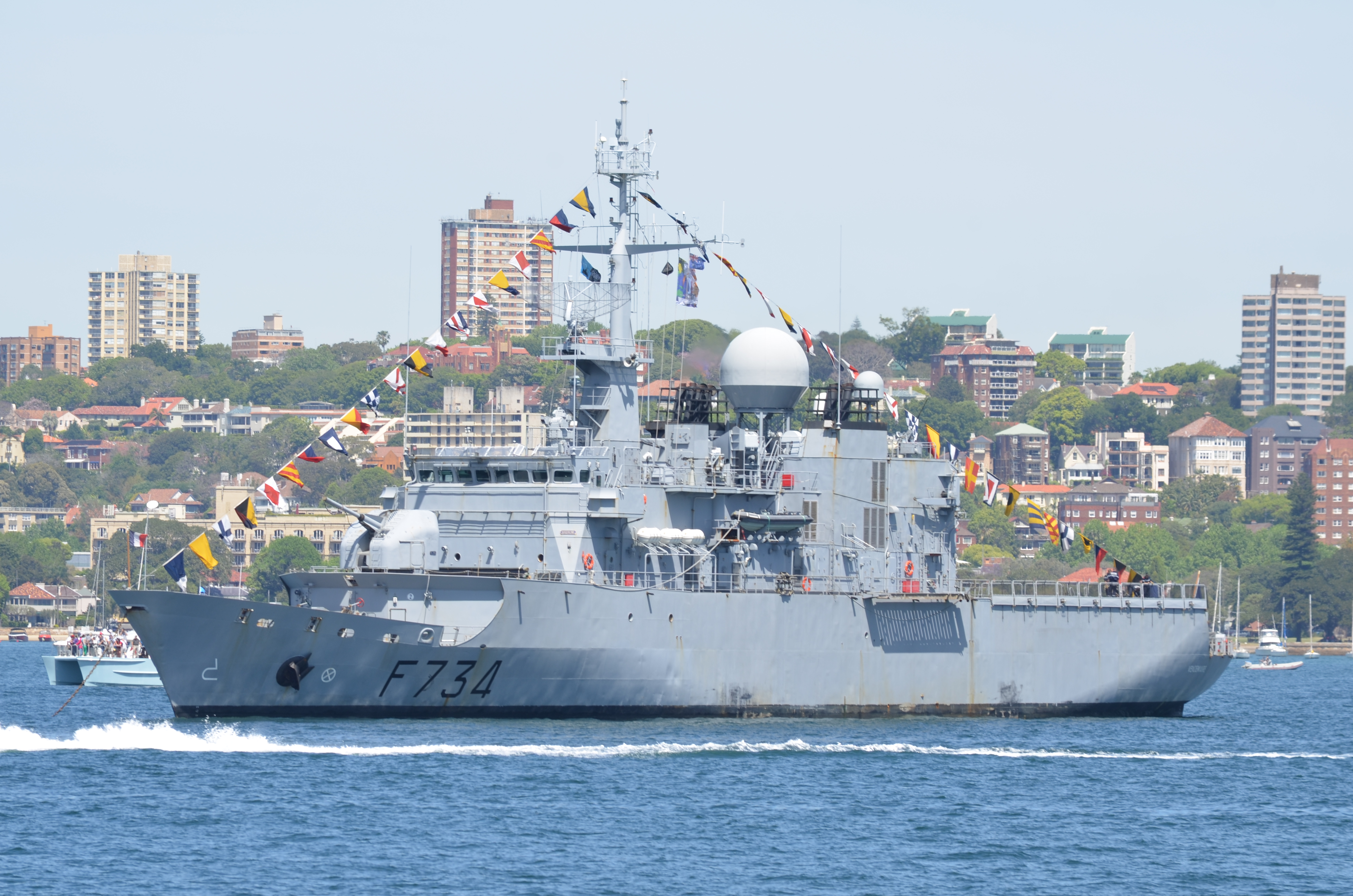
- Frigate Vendémiaire in 2013

History

France
- Name: Vendémiaire
- Namesake: Month of Vendémiaire
- Ordered: 1991
- Builder: Chantiers de l'Atlantique
- Laid down: 17 January 1992
- Launched: 23 August 1992
- Commissioned: 21 October 1993
- Home port: Nouméa
- Identification: Pennant number: F 734
- Status: in service

General characteristics
- Class & type: Floréal-class frigate
- Displacement: 2,600 t (2,600 long tons); 3,000 t (2,950 long tons) full load
- Length: 93.5 m (306 ft 9 in)
- Beam: 14 m (45 ft 11 in)
- Draught: 4.3 m (14 ft 1 in)
- Propulsion: 4 × SEMT Pielstick 6 PA6 L280 BPC diesel engines; 6,580 kW (8,820 hp); 2 shafts, 1 × 203 kW (272 hp) bow thruster
- Speed: 20 knots (37 km/h; 23 mph)
- Range: 9,000 nmi (17,000 km; 10,000 mi) at 15 knots (28 km/h; 17 mph)
- Troops: 24 marines
- Complement: 90
- Sensors & processing systems: DRBV-21C (Mars) air sentry radar; Racal Decca RM1290 navigation radar; Racal Decca RM1290 landing radar
- Electronic warfare & decoys: ARBG-1A Saïgon; 2 Dagaie decoy systems
- Armament: 2 Exocet MM38 missiles (removed); 1 × 100 mm CADAM turret with Najir fire control system; 2 × 20 mm modèle F2 guns; 2 x 2 Manually-operated SIMBAD/Mistral point defence SAM
- Aircraft carried: 1 Panther or Eurocopter Dauphin N3 helicopters (the latter replaced the former Aérospatiale Alouette III in 2022).
- Aviation facilities: Flight deck and hangar

Vendémiaire is a Floréal-class frigate (French: frégate de surveillance) of the French Navy. She is the fifth ship of the class, and is named after Vendémiaire, the first month of the Republican Calendar. The ship was constructed at Saint-Nazaire, France, in 1992 and entered service in 1993. Vendémiaire is stationed in the French Pacific territories for patrol duties.

== Design and description ==
The Floréal-class frigates were designed in response to a demand for a cheap warship capable of operating in low threat areas and able to perform general patrol functions. As a result, the Floréal class were constructed to mercantile standards in the areas of ammunition stowage, helicopter facilities and damage control, which significantly lowered the cost of the vessels. The Floréal class were designed for using modular construction which shortened their building times.

Vendémiaire has a standard displacement of 2,600 tonnes (2,600 long tons) and 3,000 tonnes (2,950 long tons) at full load. The frigate measures 85.2 metres (279 ft 6 in) long between perpendiculars and 93.5 metres (306 ft 9 in) overall with a beam of 14 metres (45 ft 11 in) and a draught of 4.3 m (14 ft 1 in). Due to the frigate's broad beam, the ship is equipped with fin stabilisers.

The frigate is powered by a combined diesel and diesel (CODAD) system comprising four SEMT Pielstick 6 PA6 L280 BPC diesel engines driving two shafts each turning a LIPS controllable pitch propeller. The CODAD system is rated at 6,580 kilowatts (8,820 hp) The vessel is also equipped with one 203-kilowatt (272 hp) bow thruster. Due to the mercantile construction design, the four diesels are all located within one machinery room for ease of maintenance. Both diesel fuel and TR5 aviation fuel is brought aboard at a single location at the stern compared to naval-constructed vessels which sport two. The ship also has three 750 kW (1,010 hp) diesel-electric generators located just fore and aft of the machinery room. Vendémiaire has a maximum speed of 20 knots (37 km/h; 23 mph) and a range of 9,000 nautical miles (17,000 km; 10,000 mi) at 15 knots (28 km/h; 17 mph).

Vendémiaire was armed with two Exocet MM38 surface-to-surface missiles in launchers situated centrally atop the midships superstructure. However, at the end of the missile's life cycle in 2014, the launchers were removed as the French Navy did not intend to replace the capability aboard the ships. The ship also mounts one 100 mm CADAM turret with the Najir fire control system located forwards and two 20 mm modèle F2 guns situated in atop the aft superstructure. The ship is equipped with DRBV-21C (Mars) air sentry, Racal Decca RM1290 navigation and Racal Decca RM1290 landing radars along with ARBG-1A Saïgon communications intercept, CSF ARBR 16A radar intercept electronic surveillance systems and two Dagaie decoy systems.

The frigate is equipped with a 30-by-15-metre (98 by 49 ft) helicopter landing pad located on the stern and a 10-by-15-metre (33 by 49 ft) hangar. The ship is capable of operating the embarked Eurocopter AS565 Panther up to sea state 5. However, as late as 2021, Aérospatiale Alouette III helicopters were also being embarked, notably in the Pacific region. In 2022, the Eurocopter Dauphin N3 was earmarked to replace the Aérospatiale Alouette IIIs after the Alouette IIIs were withdrawn from service. The ship has a complement of 90 including the aircrew and officers and 24 marines with capacity for a further 13 personnel.

== Construction and career ==
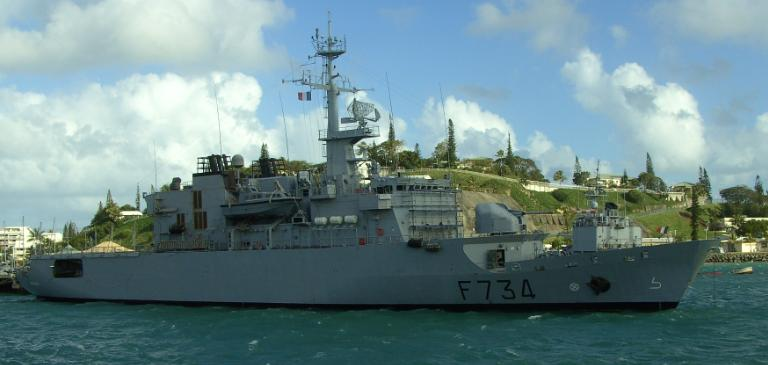
Vendémiaire alongside at Nouméa

Vendémiaire was ordered as part of the third pair in January 1991 from Chantiers de l'Atlantique for construction at their yard in Saint-Nazaire, France, and the keel was laid down on 17 January 1992. The frigate was built using modular construction methods, which reduced the vessel's construction time. Vendémiaire was launched on 23 August 1992 and commissioned into the French Navy on 21 October 1993. (Note: Jordan has the ship launched on 29 August and commissioned on 20 October.) Following sea trials, Vendémiaire sailed for Arsenal de Lorient, Lorient where the weapons and sensors were installed and underwent further trials.

Vendémiaire was assigned to Nouméa, New Caledonia in the Pacific Ocean. The frigate was deployed to East Timor as part of the Australian-led INTERFET peacekeeping taskforce from 20 September to 17 November 1999.

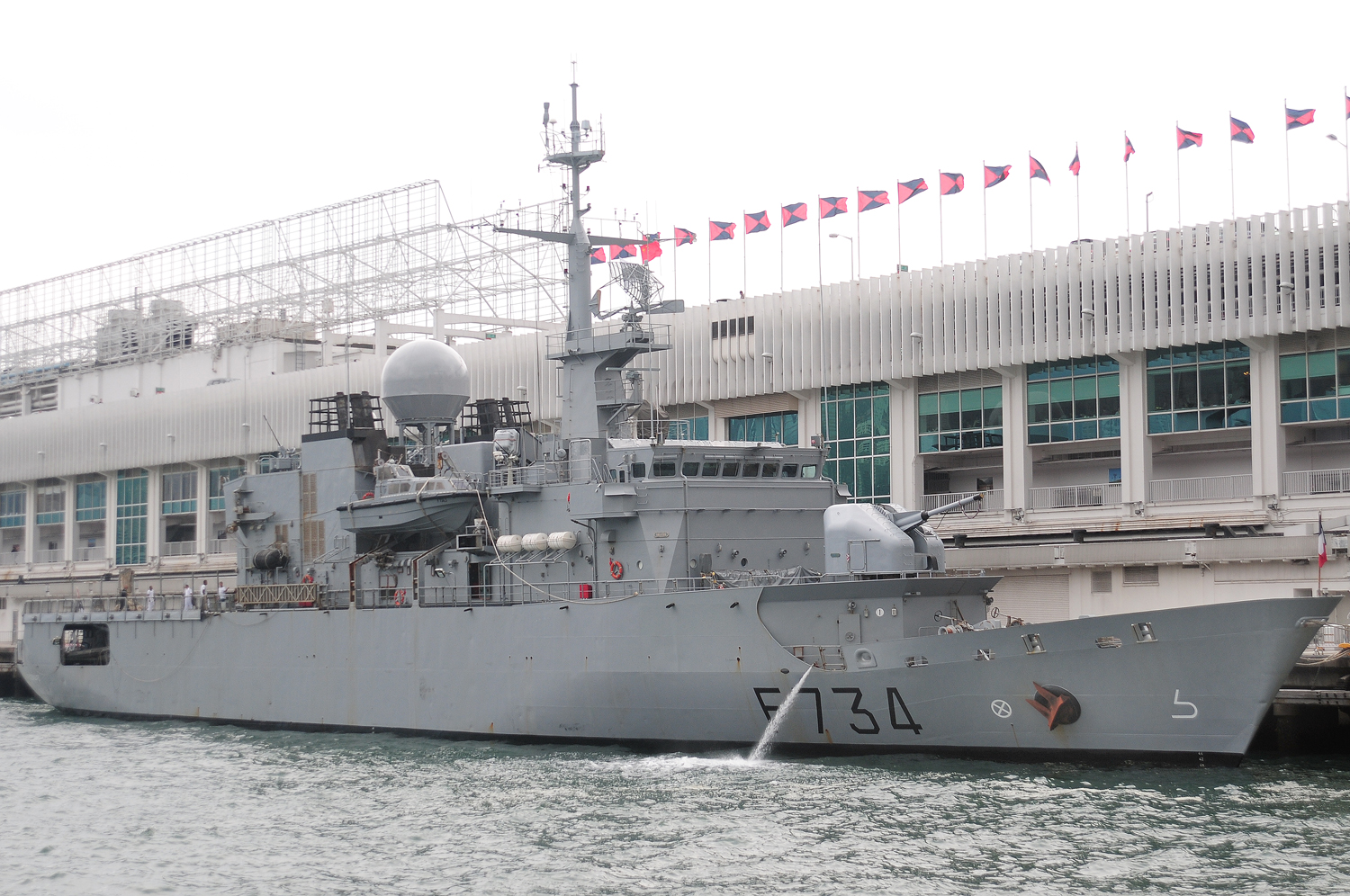
Vendémiaire alongside at Ocean Terminal, Hong Kong in 2011

The ship went on a tour of China in 2011, stopping at Hong Kong. Vendémiaire was opened to the public 17 April 2011 in Hong Kong. The ship visited the city again from 26 February to 2 March 2018, being opened for public tours. In October 2013 the vessel participated in the International Fleet Review 2013 in Sydney, Australia.

From 1 to 3 June 2015, Vendémiaire performed French sovereignty missions to Matthew Island and Hunter Island. In 2015, following Cyclone Pam France ordered Vendémiaire to sail from Nouméa to Vanuatu to conduct surveys along with aircraft from the island territory.

After the Cyclone Pam operations, Vendémiaire sailed to Wellington, New Zealand in April 2016 to take part in the ANZAC commemorations. In May 2016, the frigate stopped at Busan, South Korea for joint training with the Republic of Korea Navy. On 27 July 2017, the ship intercepted 1.4 tonnes (1.5 tons) of cocaine from the sailing vessel Afalina off the coast of Tonga. From 17–21 February 2018, the frigate visited Incheon, South Korea, performing joint operations with the Republic of Korea Navy.

On 6 April 2019, Vendémiaire sailed through the Taiwan Strait, shadowed by Chinese naval forces. China issued a diplomatic protest after Vendémiaire allegedly violated Chinese territorial waters; France holds that the Taiwan Strait is international waters and claimed a right to freedom of navigation. Vendémiaire was subsequently absent at the celebration of the 70th anniversary of the People's Liberation Army Navy at Qingdao, which she had been scheduled to attend. In September 2019, Vendémiaire joined naval units from the Royal Australian Navy and Japan Maritime Self-Defense Force for naval exercises off the coast of Australia.

In early 2023, Vendémiaire spent three months in refit in New Zealand before returning to Noumea for the biennial international exercise Croix du Sud 2023.

In April 2024, the ship was the first French vessel to participate in a multilateral maritime exercise as part of Exercise Balikatan in the Philippines. She participated alongside BRP Ramon Alcaraz, BRP Davao del Sur, USS Harpers Ferry and USS Somerset.
