= USCGC Dallas (WHEC-716) =

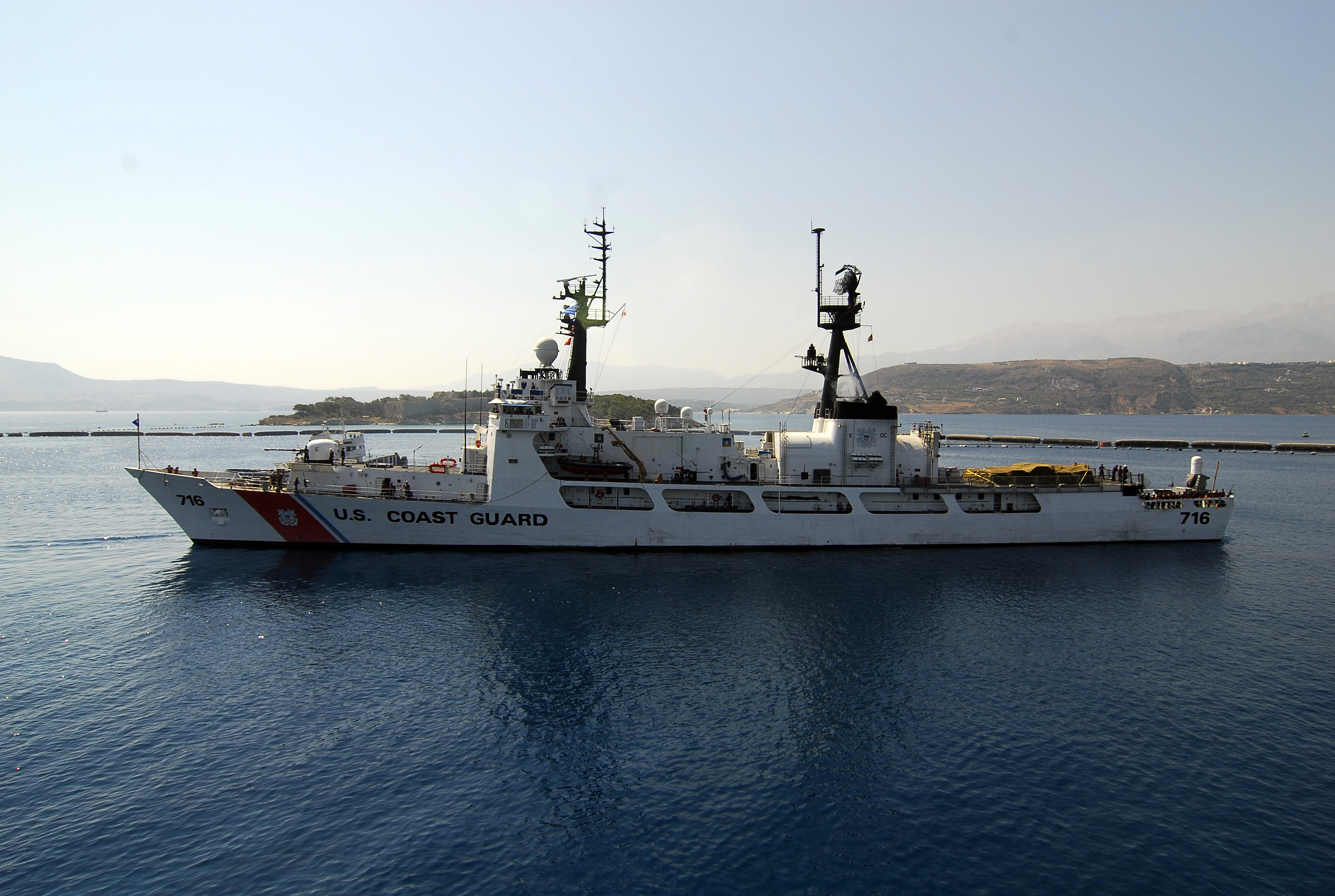
- USCGC Dallas (WHEC-716) in 2008

History

United States
- Name: Dallas
- Namesake: Alexander J. Dallas
- Builder: Avondale Shipyards
- Launched: 1 October 1966
- Commissioned: 26 October 1967
- Decommissioned: 30 March 2012
- Home port: Charleston, South Carolina
- Motto: Semper Nostra Optima; (Always Our Best)
- Fate: Transferred to the Philippine Navy on 22 May 2012 as BRP Ramon Alcaraz

General characteristics
- Class & type: Hamilton-class cutter
- Displacement: 3,250 tons
- Length: 378 ft (115 m)
- Beam: 43 ft (13 m)
- Draft: 15 ft (4.6 m)
- Propulsion: Two diesel engines and two gas turbine engines
- Speed: 29 knots (54 km/h)
- Range: 14,000 mi (22,531 km)
- Endurance: 45 days
- Complement: 167 personnel
- Sensors & processing systems: AN/SPS-40 air-search radar and MK 92 Fire Control System
- Armament: 1 × OTO Melara MK-75 76 mm (3 in) gun (replacing 5 in (127 mm) gun); 2 × MK-38 25 mm (1.0 in) machine gun system; 2 × MK 36 SRBOC systems and M240 7.62 mm (0.3 in) machine guns.

USCGC Dallas (WHEC-716) was a United States Coast Guard high endurance cutter commissioned in 1967 at the Avondale Shipyard in New Orleans, Louisiana. She was the sixth ship or boat to bear the name of Alexander J. Dallas, the Secretary of the Treasury under President James Madison (1814–1816). She is one of twelve Hamilton-class cutters built for the Coast Guard.

Dallas served in the Atlantic Ocean, venturing as far away as the Black Sea and Africa on occasion.

Dallas was at first home ported at the former Coast Guard base on Governors Island, New York. She was relocated to her final homeport of Charleston, South Carolina in September 1996. She was decommissioned on 30 March 2012, and was transferred to the Philippines on May 22, 2012, as an excess defense article through the Foreign Assistance Act.

== Service history ==
=== 1960s and 1970s ===
In her earlier years, Dallas collected meteorological and oceanographic data while on ocean station as part of the Gate Project, and she assisted commercial aircraft crossing the Atlantic Ocean.

During seven combat patrols off the coast of Vietnam, Dallas undertook 161 gunfire support missions involving 7,665 rounds of her 5-inch ammunition. This resulted in 58 sampans destroyed and 29 Viet Cong supply routes, bases, camps, or rest areas damaged or destroyed. Her 5-inch (127 mm) gun made her very valuable to the naval missions in the area.

During the United States Bicentennial in 1976, Dallas became the first US vessel to serve as escort of HMY Britannia.

Dallas served as a patrol vessel for the 1977 America's Cup Regatta out of Newport, Rhode Island. In September 1978, Dallas joined the search on Georges Bank for Captain Cosmo, a fishing vessel out of Gloucester, Massachusetts. Dallas encountered seas during that search as high as the bridge wings, the decks of which are 38 feet from the waterline. Dallas also came upon the Queen Elizabeth 2 on that patrol, which reported taking a rogue wave over the bow that cracked windows on the bridge. The Captain Cosmo was lost with all hands in high seas.

In April 1979, as Dallas was wrapping up a patrol and heading into Bermuda for a weekend of R&R, she received orders to sail south to the Caribbean island of Saint Vincent. Its volcano, La Soufrière, was threatening to erupt and Dallas might be called upon to evacuate islanders. After several days of patrolling nearby, the volcano did send a large ash plum skyward, but an evacuation was not needed.

=== 1980s ===
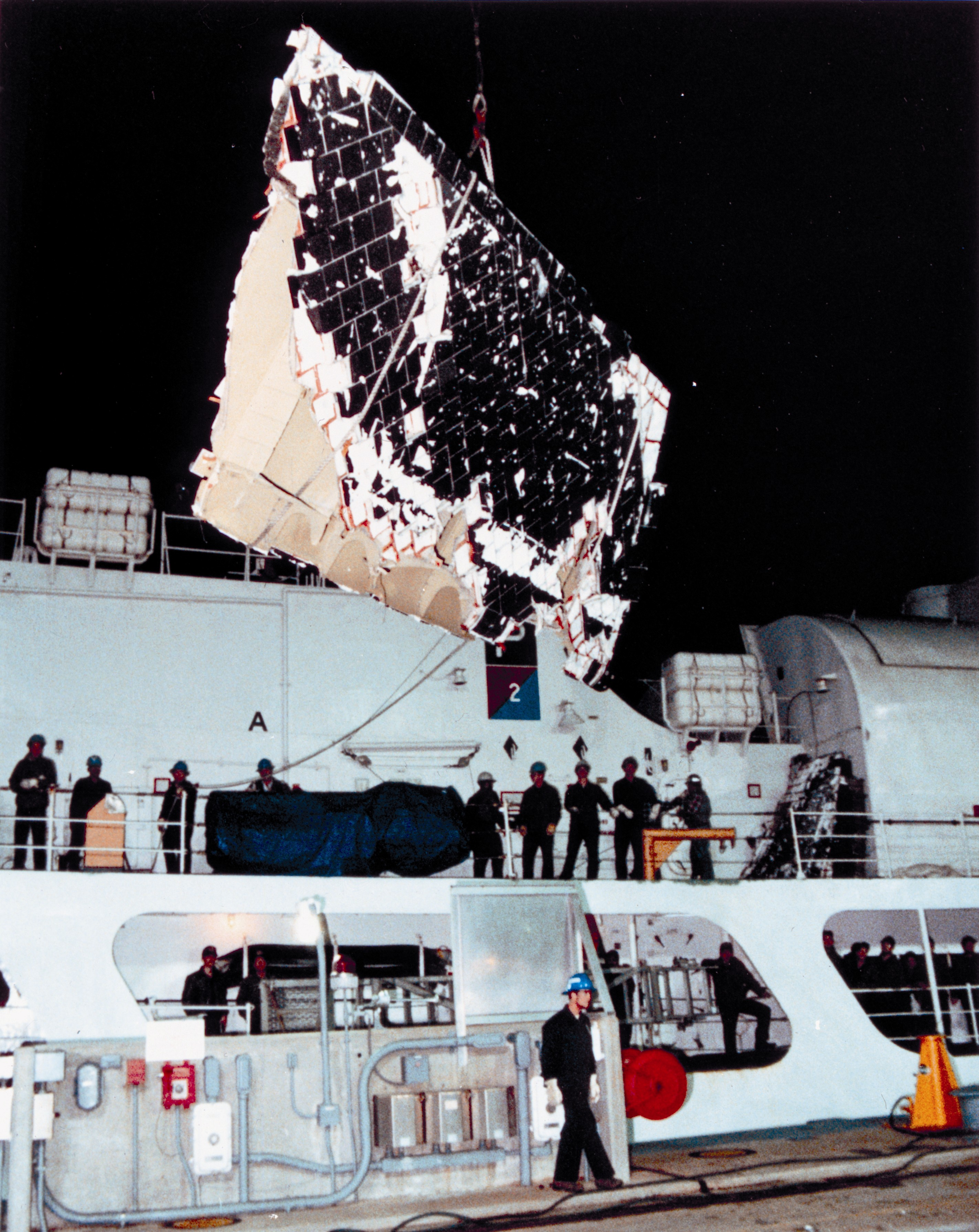
STS-51-L debris aboard the USCG cutter Dallas

In 1980, Dallas was the command ship for the historic Mariel Boatlift, during which 125,000 Cuban refugees set sail for the shores of Florida. At the time, it was the largest humanitarian operation ever undertaken by the Coast Guard. In 1983, the Dallas earned a Coast Guard Unit Commendation for achievements that included the seizure of seven vessels smuggling over 103,000 lb (47,000 kg) of marijuana and the interdiction of 90 illegal Haitian migrants. In 1986, Dallas served as the on-scene command for the search and rescue operation following the Space Shuttle Challenger disaster. For her service during this operation, Dallas received the Coast Guard's Meritorious Unit Commendation.

In the late 1980s, Dallas underwent a fleet rehabilitation and modernization (FRAM) program in the Bath Iron Works shipyard at Portland, Maine. During that period, her living quarters, electronics, sensors, and weapons systems were upgraded to allow continued service beyond the year 2000. Dallas was recommissioned by the "cross-decked" crew from Gallatin on December 20, 1989.

=== 1990s ===
During the Haitian migrant crisis of 1991–92, Dallas performed as the flagship of a flotilla of twenty-seven Coast Guard cutters that rescued 35,000 migrants from hundreds of overcrowded, unseaworthy vessels. Dallas received a Humanitarian Service Medal and another Coast Guard Unit Commendation for her efforts in establishing an operation task organization that serves as the model for today's Coast Guard multi-unit operation. In response to the renewed threats of a mass exodus from Haiti, Operation Able Manner began in January 1993, with large numbers of Coast Guard and U.S. Navy ships and aircraft deploying to the Caribbean. Dallas assumed command of this flotilla on three separate patrols in 1993, earning her yet another Coast Guard Unit Commendation.

Dallas spent the summer of 1994 representing the Coast Guard in France at the 50th D-Day invasion anniversary. During those festivities, Dallas steamed with the reenactment fleet to commemorate the event.

Soon after the D-Day celebration, Dallas was called upon to be the flagship for the Operation Able Vigil in response to another mass exodus from Cuba. Able Vigil was the largest Coast Guard commanded, but multi-service, operation since the 1940s.

During the summer of 1995, Dallas operated with the United States Sixth Fleet in the Mediterranean Sea. Among her many assignments, Dallas worked with the USS Theodore Roosevelt Battle Group in support of Operation Deny Flight off the coast of Yugoslavia. Dallas's crew conducted nation-building training and professional exchange in various countries in the Mediterranean, the Adriatic Sea, and the Black Sea. Dallas worked with the navies, coast guards, and maritime agencies of Turkey, Romania, Bulgaria, Tunisia, Slovenia, Albania, and Italy. This marked the first time that a U.S. Coast Guard cutter operated with the U.S. Sixth Fleet and also entered the Black Sea. Dallas earned the Armed Forces Service Medal for her contributions to Operations Deny Flight, Maritime Monitor, and Sharp Guard.

During 1997 and 1998, Dallas served as the flagship for Operations Frontier Shield and Frontier Lance, the largest interagency, international counter-narcotic operations in the Caribbean to date.

In the summer of 1999, Dallas was again assigned to the U.S. Sixth Fleet in the Mediterranean and Black Seas to support allied forces during the conflict in Kosovo. While en route, the conflict ended, but Dallas was ordered to remain in theater to conduct training and professional exchanges with US Naval units and foreign naval forces. Dallas became the first Coast Guard cutter to enter the ports of Haifa, Israel, and Antalya, Turkey, and she conducted training exercises with the Ukrainian Navy, Turkish Coast Guard, Georgian Navy, and the armed forces of Malta.

During the entire 1990-2000 decade Dallas held the Commander of the Atlantic Area's Operational Readiness Award for sustained excellence in all Coast Guard warfare mission areas.

=== 2000s ===
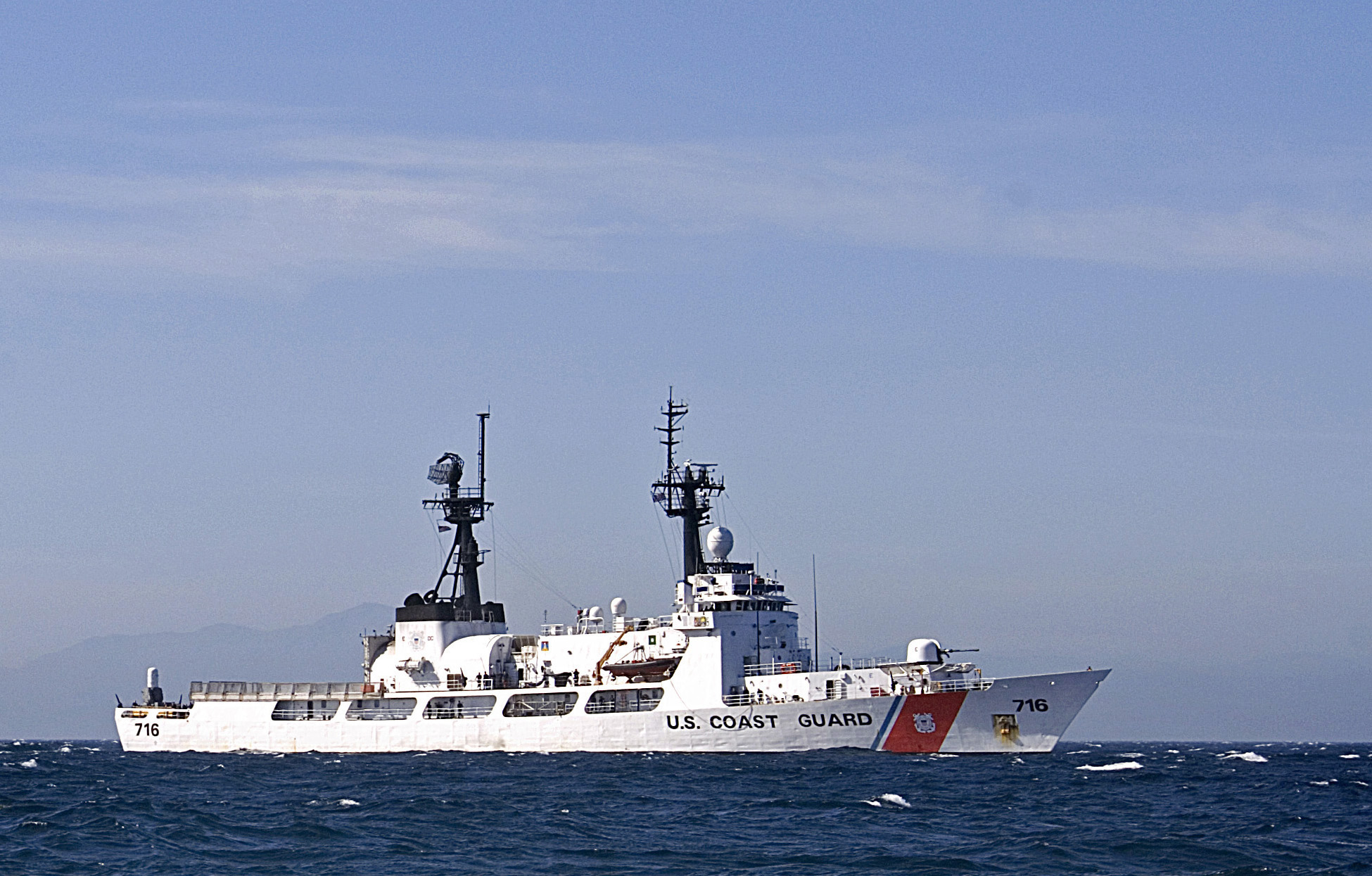
USCGC Dallas leaving Gibraltar on August 11, 2008

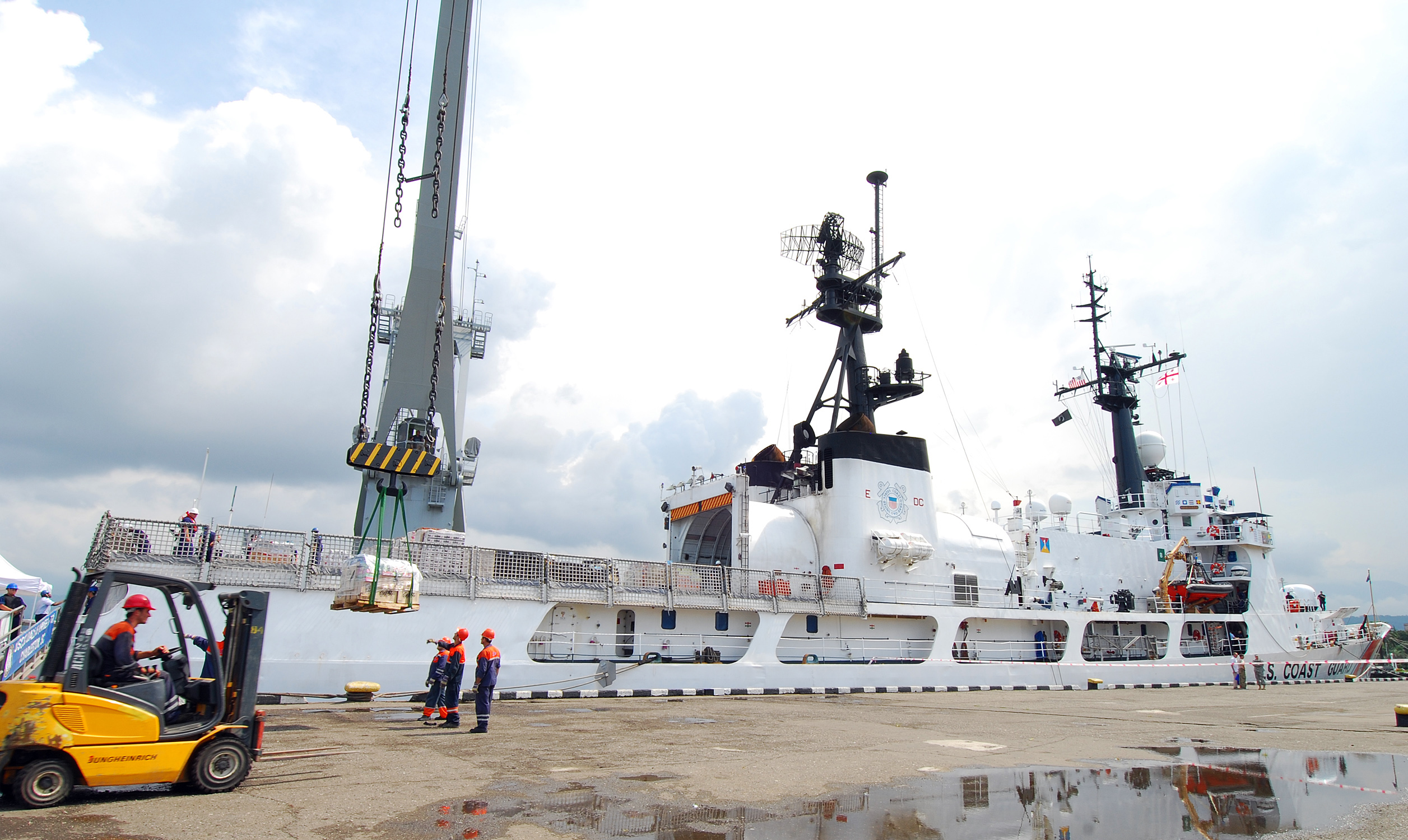
USCGC Dallas delivering humanitarian aid in Georgia on August 27, 2008

Following the terrorist attacks of September 11, 2001 on New York and Virginia, Dallas was deployed as part of Operation Noble Eagle off the coast of the southeastern United States. Her mission was to interrogate and board vessels entering US waterways. This marked a change in the Coast Guard's operations as an emphasis on homeland security preceded Dallas's previous missions of drug interdiction and operations with the U.S. Navy overseas.

During the summer of 2002, Dallas took part in a new approach to maritime drug interdiction. Deployed alongside Gallatin, the only other 378-foot cutter on the East Coast, Dallas took part in Operation New Frontier. Operation New Frontier utilized armed helicopters from the Helicopter Interdiction Tactical Squadron (HITRON) to stop small high-speed vessels ("go-fasts") before they could reach their destination.

In 2003, Dallas was assigned to the U.S. Sixth Fleet in the Mediterranean Sea in support of Operation Iraqi Freedom. Dallas initially provided armed escorts through the Straits of Gibraltar and conducted boardings of vessels leaving the Suez Canal, as the Iraqis retreated. Dallas made port calls in Rota, Spain, Split, Croatia, Sicily, and Madeira, Portugal.

In August 2008, Dallas was sent to Georgia's shoreline on the Black Sea in support of Operation Assured Delivery in order to bring humanitarian supplies to those affected by the South Ossetia war. With Georgia's main naval base at Poti effectively under Russian control, Dallas instead docked at Batumi, as did USS McFaul and nine other NATO ships.

Dallas's awards include: two Joint Meritorious Unit Awards, three Coast Guard Unit Commendations, a Navy Unit Commendation (as part of the Battle Force 6th Fleet Task Force 60 for Operation Iraqi Freedom), two Coast Guard Meritorious Unit Commendations, a Navy Meritorious Unit Commendation, the Vietnam Service Medal, the Armed Forces Service Medal, three Humanitarian Service Medals, numerous Coast Guard Special Operations Service Ribbons, the Republic of Vietnam Gallantry Cross Unit Citation, the Republic of Vietnam Civil Actions Unit Citation, and the Republic of Vietnam Campaign Medal.

=== Transfer to the Philippine Navy ===
The Philippine Navy officially confirmed the Joint Visual Inspection (JVI) by its officials led by Rear Admiral Orwen Cortez of South Carolina-based Hamilton-class cutter USCGC Dallas from October 31 to November 5, 2011. The ship was transferred as an excess defense article through the Foreign Assistance Act via a "hot transfer" in May 2012.

The Philippine Navy renamed the vessel BRP Ramon Alcaraz after a World War II naval hero, Ramon A. Alcaraz.

== In popular culture ==
Friday the 13th Part VIII: Jason Takes Manhattan (1989) — Around the 43 minute mark a distress call sent from the ship Lazarus is received on the nearby USCGC Dallas.

== See also ==
- BRP Ramon Alcaraz (FF-16)
