= Operation Assured Delivery =

- Part of Russo-Georgian War
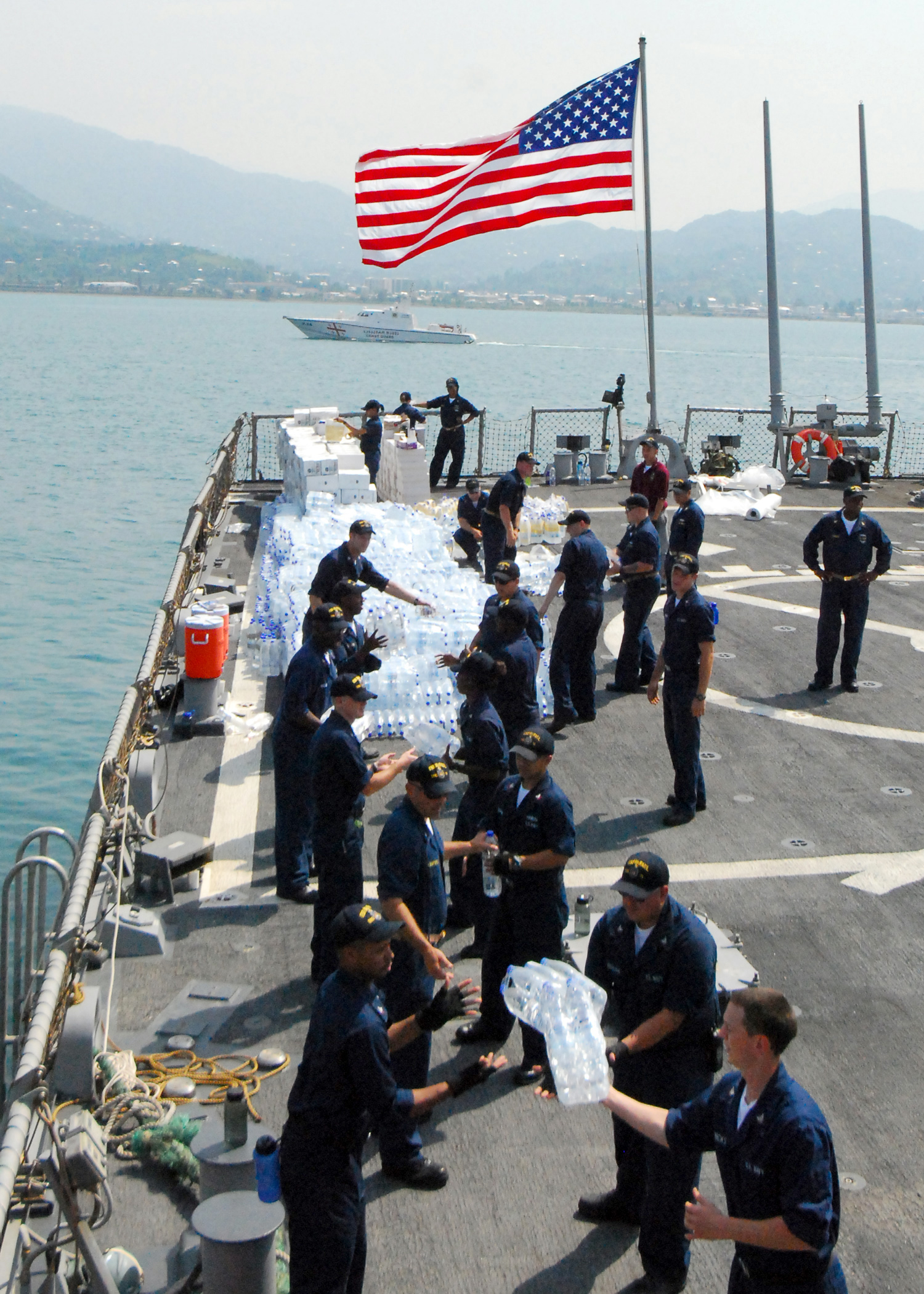
- United States sailors unloading supplies on August 24, 2008, at Batumi with Georgian Coast Guard vessel in the background
Date	13 August 2008 – 10 September 2008 (4 weeks)
Location	Georgia 41°38′45″N 41°38′30″E
Result	More than 1,145 short tons of Humanitarian aid delivered by air and 123 short tons by sea

Operation Assured Delivery was the United States Armed Forces' humanitarian response to humanitarian needs in Georgia following the Russo-Georgian War in 2008. The logistical operation provided medical supplies, shelter, food and hygiene provisions for the civilian population of Georgia.

== Background ==
The 1936 Montreux Convention imposed severe restrictions on the ability of non-Black Sea countries to send naval forces into the Black Sea. No more than nine non-Black Sea naval vessels can pass into the Black Sea, with the tonnage of ships one non-Black Sea nation can send being restricted to 30,000. The non-Black Sea naval vessels can remain in Black Sea only for three weeks. The Convention also explicitly forbids the passage of aircraft carriers.

On 15 August 2008, James Cartwright, the vice chairman of the US Joint Chiefs of Staff, said that the United States intended to send two U.S. Navy hospital ships to Georgia. Steven Romano, European Command director of logistics, said that the US intended to provide supplies to Georgia and added that the US Mediterranean assets might be used for the operation. However, on 18 August, Kathryn Schalow, U.S. Embassy press attache in Ankara, while noting that a lot of actions for the purpose of humanitarian assistance had been already taking place, demurred answering whether the US asked for permission to allow the USNS Comfort and the USNS Mercy into Black Sea, with each displacing 69,360 tons. Turkey historically was "less than accommodating to the Pentagon's request for Turkish Straits passage" and objected to the US hospital ships entering the Black Sea. However, On August 21, US State Department spokesman Robert A. Wood said that "Turkey has approved three ships for transit into the Black Sea to transport humanitarian relief supplies to Georgia - that will consist of two United States Navy ships and a United States Coast Guard Cutter".

== Deployment of U.S. Forces ==
=== U.S. Air Force ===
As of August 27, 2008, the U.S. Air Force had flown 55 airlift sorties transporting 1,944,000 pounds of supplies since 13 August.

=== U.S. Navy ===
On August 24, the U.S. Navy destroyer USS McFaul arrived to the Georgian port of Batumi. As of August 27, 2008, the U.S. Navy destroyer had delivered 155,000 pounds of supplies to Georgia. In addition, the command ship USS Mount Whitney arrived in the Georgian port of Poti on September 5 with additional supplies.

=== U.S. Coast Guard ===
As of August 27, 2008, the U.S. Coast Guard cutter USCGC Dallas had delivered 76,000 pounds of assistance for refugees.

== Russian reaction ==
In late August 2008, Russian President Dmitry Medvedev accused the States of using Operation Assured Delivery as a cover for delivering military support to Georgia. Media reports have suggested that USS McFaul docked in the Georgian-controlled port of Batumi, rather than the primary Georgian port of Poti which was controlled by Russians in order to prevent encounter with the Russian military. Several Russian warships were deployed to Poti at the same time as Americans arrived.

However, the USS Mount Whitney docked in Poti on 5 September 2008. American military spokesman stated that the right of inspection of the ship would be denied to the Russian military. Russian authorities were concerned about the ship's arrival, claiming that the ship were bringing significant U.S. military weapons. The Russian Black Sea Fleet source also noted that it was command-and-control vessel in charge of other NATO ships in the Black Sea.

== See also ==
- Georgia-NATO relations
