= USS Somerset (LPD-25) =

US Navy amphibious transport ship

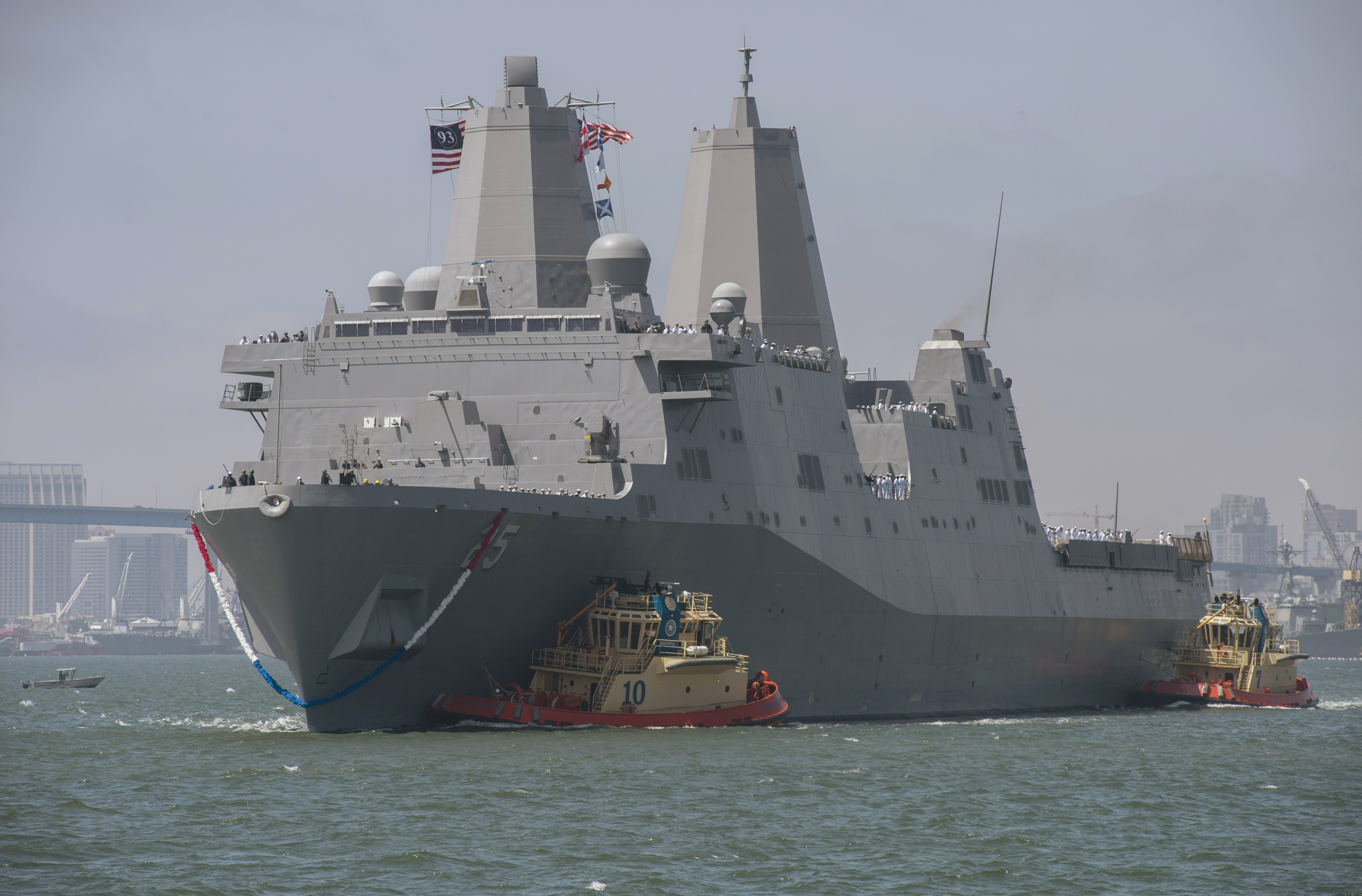
- USS Somerset on 21 April 2014

History

United States
- Name: Somerset
- Namesake: Somerset County, Pennsylvania, U.S.
- Awarded: 21 December 2007
- Builder: Avondale Shipyard
- Laid down: 11 December 2009
- Launched: 14 April 2012
- Sponsored by: Mrs. Mary Jo Myers
- Christened: 28 July 2012
- Commissioned: 1 March 2014
- Home port: San Diego
- Identification: MMSI number: 369970850; Callsign: NSOM; Pennant number: LPD-25
- Motto: Vertus per Adversa, "Courage through Adversity"
- Status: in active service
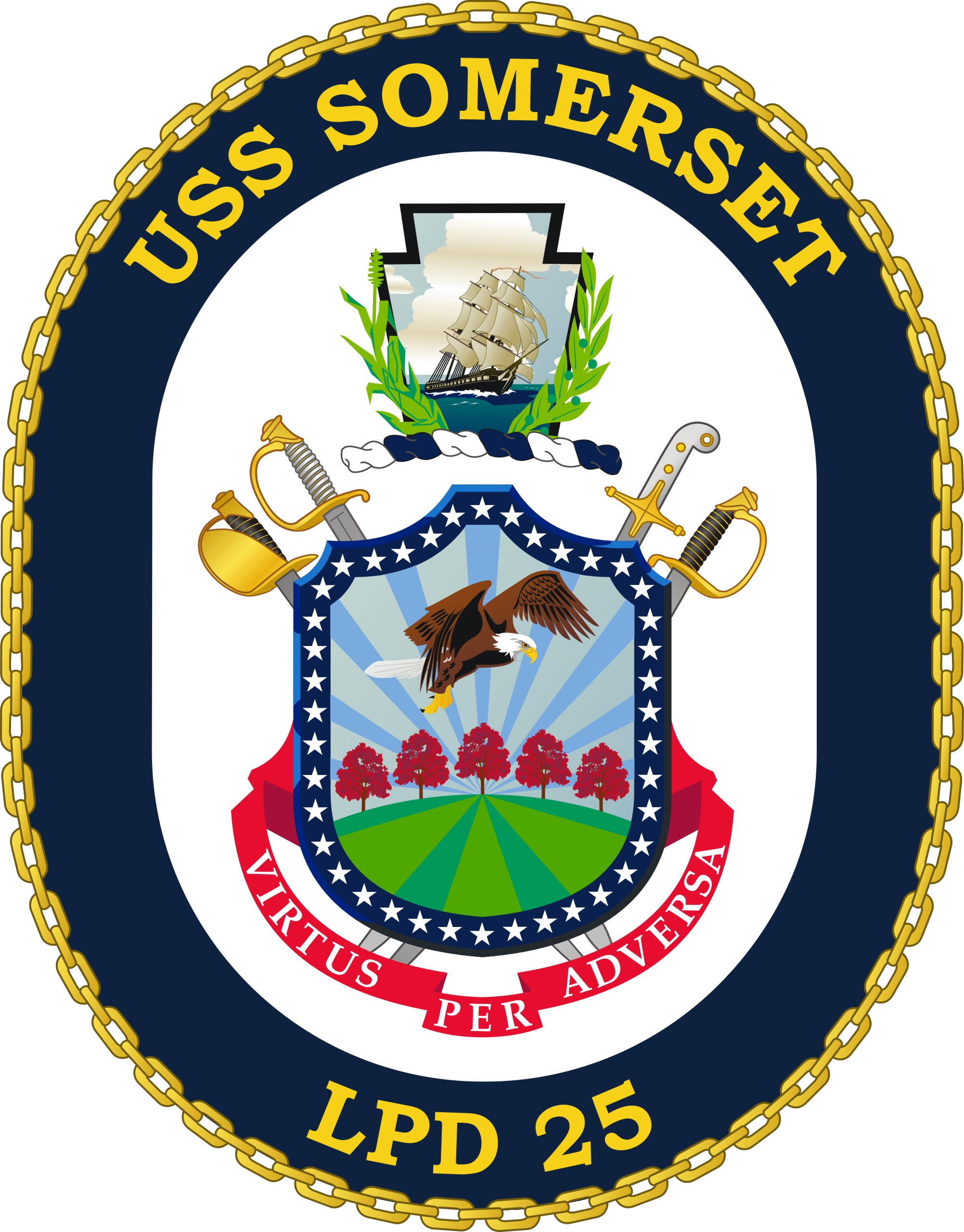
- Badge

General characteristics
- Class & type: San Antonio-class amphibious transport dock
- Displacement: 25,000 tons full
- Length: 208.5 m (684 ft) overall, 201.4 m (661 ft) waterline
- Beam: 31.9 m (105 ft) extreme, 29.5 m (97 ft) waterline
- Draft: 7 m (23 ft)
- Propulsion: Four Fairbanks Morse Defense diesel engines, two shafts, 40,000 hp (30 MW)
- Speed: 22 knots (41 km/h)
- Boats & landing craft carried: Two LCACs (air cushion); or one LCU (conventional)
- Capacity: 699 (66 officers, 633 enlisted); surge to 800 total.
- Complement: 28 officers, 333 enlisted
- Armament: Two 30 mm Bushmaster II cannons, for surface threat defense; two Rolling Airframe Missile launchers for air defense
- Aircraft carried: Four CH-46 Sea Knight helicopters or two MV-22 Osprey tilt rotor aircraft may be launched or recovered simultaneously.

USS Somerset (LPD-25) is a San Antonio-class amphibious transport dock of the United States Navy. It is the fourth United States Navy vessel and the second warship to bear this name, the first two being a wooden-hulled motorboat and a ferry.

The first warship, an armed cargo ship from World War II, was named for the Somerset counties of Maine, Maryland, New Jersey and Pennsylvania.

The modern ship was named specifically for Somerset County, Pennsylvania, in honor of the passengers who died on United Airlines Flight 93, which was hijacked during the terror attacks of 11 September 2001. The passengers prevented the plane from reaching its intended target by forcing it to crash in Stonycreek Township, Somerset County, PA. The words "Let's Roll," spoken by a passenger of United Airlines Flight 93 before trying to storm the cockpit of the doomed flight, are painted on the ship above the rear deck, along with a "93" seal which mirrors the "93" flag seen flying on the vessel in many photos. In the words of Secretary of the Navy Gordon R. England;

"The courage and heroism of the people aboard the flight will never be forgotten and USS Somerset will leave a legacy that will never be forgotten by those wishing to do harm to this country."

== Construction ==
Approximately 22 tons of steel from a Marion 7500 dragline that stood near Flight 93's crash site were used to construct Somerset's keel.

The contract to build the Somerset was awarded on 21 December 2007 to Northrop Grumman Ship Systems of Pascagoula, Mississippi. Her keel was laid down on 11 December 2009, at Northrop Grumman's Avondale shipyard in New Orleans, Louisiana. She was launched on 14 April 2012, and christened three months later on 28 July sponsored by Mrs. Mary Jo Myers, the wife of General Richard Myers, former Chairman of the Joint Chiefs of Staff. She completed acceptance trials in September 2013.

USS Somerset supporting Amphibious Combat Vehicle testing off the coast of Camp Pendleton, California, 2020 (1:23)

On 3 February 2014, the Somerset was recorded as the last Navy ship to depart from the Avondale shipyard, before its closing. She was commissioned on 1 March 2014 in Philadelphia, Pennsylvania.

During RIMPAC 2024, a containerized hybrid manufacturing system using Meltio's metal 3D printing technology was operated aboard the ship by the Naval Postgraduate School, producing a replacement pump component within 34 hours.
