= BRP Tarlac =

BRP Tarlac is the name of the following ships of the Philippine Navy, named for the province of Tarlac:

- BRP Tarlac (LT-500), ex-USS LST-47, acquired in 1976, decommissioned 1980s
- BRP Tarlac (LD-601), lead Tarlac-class landing platform dock, launched and commissioned in 2016

== See also ==
- Tarlac (disambiguation)
