= BRP Leyte (LD-604) =

Philippine Navy amphibious transport ship

Philippines
- Name: BRP Leyte
- Namesake: Philippine province of Leyte
- Ordered: 20 July 2022
- Builder: PT PAL Indonesia
- Laid down: scheduled July 2026
- Launched: scheduled early 2027
- Status: Under construction

General characteristics
- Class & type: Tarlac-class Flight II landing platform dock
- Displacement: Standard: 7,200 tons
- Length: 124 m (406 ft 10 in)
- Beam: 21.8 m (71.5 ft)
- Height: 21.8 m (71 ft 6 in)
- Draft: 6.7 m (22 ft 0 in)
- Installed power: 4 × diesel generators
- Propulsion: Combined diesel and diesel (CODAD) arrangement: 2 × MAN-STX 8L27/38 diesel engines, each producing 3,915 bhp (2,920 kW)
- Speed: 16 knots (30 km/h; 18 mph) @ 85% MCR
- Range: 9,360 nmi (17,330 km; 10,770 mi) @ 13 knots (24 km/h; 15 mph) cruising speed
- Endurance: 30 days (crew), 15 days (full)
- Boats & landing craft carried: 2 × LCU or LCM at floodable well decks; 2 × RHIB or LCVP at boat davits; Capacity to carry 2 x Multi-Purpose Attack Craft (MPAC) Mk. 3 interdiction boats
- Capacity: 500 troops plus associated vehicles and equipment
- Complement: 121 crew (including air crew)
- Sensors & processing systems: X-band & S-band navigational radars; Forward Looking Infra-Red (FLIR) camera; Combat management system (planned); Surface search radar (planned); Air search radar (planned); Electro-Optical Fire Control System (planned); Hull-mounted sonar (planned)
- Electronic warfare & decoys: Electronic Warfare Suite (planned); 4 × six-tube Terma C-Guard mortar-type decoy launchers (planned)
- Armament: 1 × Oto Melara 76mm Super Rapid on foredeck (FFBNW); 1 x gun-based CIWS, either Rheinmetall Oerlikon Millennium Gun or Aselsan GOKDENIZ (FFBNW); 2 × 30mm secondary guns, one each on port and starboard sides (FFBNW); 8 x Sarsilmaz SAR127 50-cal (12.7mm) heavy machine guns
- Aircraft carried: 2 x 10-ton naval helicopter, several VTOL unmanned aerial vehicles
- Aviation facilities: Hangar for 1 medium (10-ton) helicopter and/or unmanned aerial vehicles; Flight deck for 2 medium (10-ton) helicopters

Leyte (604) is a new 124-meter (406 ft 10 in) landing platform dock that is scheduled for delivery and commissioning with the Philippine Navy as the BRP Leyte (LD-604). The ship is being constructed by PT PAL Indonesia for the Philippine Navy's Landing Dock Acquisition Project as part the Armed Forces of the Philippines Modernization Program's Horizon 2 phase.

The ship is based on improve sub-class of the previously commissioned Tarlac class, which was also constructed by PT PAL.

The ship's name was not formally announced by both PT PAL and the Philippine Navy but was identified as Leyte from a news report.

== Development ==
=== Concept Design ===
The Philippine Navy included plans to procure 2 new landing platform docks as part of its Horizon 2 modernization phase, with the proposal with a budget of PHP5.56 billion among those approved in-principle by Philippine President Rodrigo Duterte in June 2018. This would allow the Philippine Navy to increase its sealift and amphibious assault capabilities to reach its planned overall capability.

The Philippines' Department of National Defense (DND) signed a contract with Indonesian shipbuilder PT PAL Indonesia on 24 June 2022, with the shipbuilder delivering a variant of their improved 123-meter Strategic Sealift Vessel / Tarlac-class design.

According to the technical specifications released as part of the project's tender documents, the ship will have improvements over the current Tarlac-class landing platform docks, despite both classes originating from a similar base design. The improvements were formulated based on the Philippine Navy's experience in operating the Tarlac-class, and knowing its strengths and shortcomings.

Among the improvements released publicly, the ships will have improved air conditioning system, larger side ramps, higher vehicle and well deck ceiling, spaces to support MPAC operations, and improved future proofing to accept Fitted for But Not With (FFBNW) subsystems.

=== Armaments ===
The Philippine Navy released information to tenderers that the ships are to be built with allowance for a 76-millimeter (3.0 in) Oto Melara 76 mm Super Rapid main gun, two 30 mm (1.2 in) Aselsan SMASH secondary guns, either the Rheinmetall Oerlikon Millennium Gun or the Aselsan GOKDENIZ gun-based close-in weapon systems, and 8 manually operated 12.7mm heavy machine guns.

PT PAL confirmed in released proposals that their submitted landing docks design allows for a 76 mm main gun on the foredeck, two stern-facing 30 mm secondary guns will also be fitted, one each on the port and starboard sides. The weapons systems are supposed to be installed separately by the Philippine Navy after delivery.

Recent procurements by the Philippine Navy indicate that the ships would have eight manually-operated 12.7mm heavy machine guns, specifically the Sarsilmaz SAR127 from Turkiye.

=== Flight support ===
Originally, the ships were designed to accommodate two medium-sized (10-ton) helicopters on the flight deck, and one similar-sized helicopter on the hangar, with the specifications emphasizing the US-made Sikorsky Black Hawk and Italian-made AgustaWestland AW139 helicopter as basis. But changes in the Philippine Navy's requirement later on changed the design to have a hangar for one medium (10-ton) helicopter and a flight deck for two medium (10-ton) helicopters.

=== Ship systems ===
On 20 July 2024, defense contractor EID, a subsidiary of Cohort plc, announced that it had secured a contract with PT PAL to supply its Integrated Communications Control System (ICCS) for integration into the landing platform docks under construction for the Philippine Navy.

== Construction ==
The steel cutting ceremony was conducted on 22 July 2024. Delays were reported in the construction, as the ship was originally scheduled for launch in mid-2025. PT PAL confirmed the delays and the rectifications to meet its contract obligations, with the ship scheduled to have its keel laid in July 2026.

== See also ==
- List of ships of the Philippine Navy
