= KRI Balaputradewa =

Frigate of Indonesian Navy

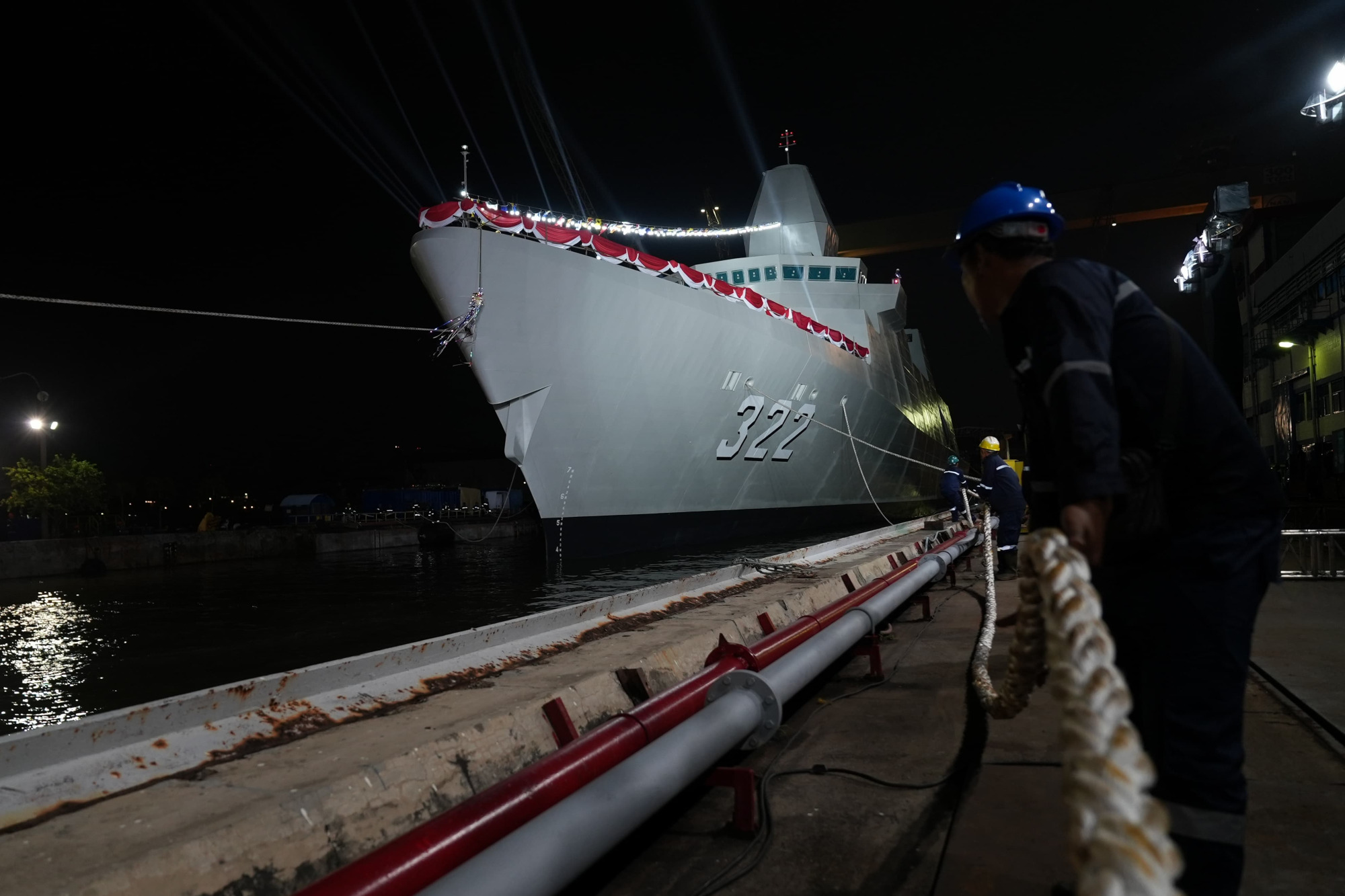
- KRI Balaputradewa at its launching ceremony

History

Indonesia
- Name: KRI Balaputradewa
- Namesake: Balaputra of Srivijaya
- Ordered: 30 April 2020
- Builder: PAL Indonesia, Surabaya
- Cost: USD 360 Million per unit
- Yard number: W000304
- Laid down: 25 August 2023
- Launched: 18 December 2025
- Identification: Pennant number: 322
- Status: Fitting out

General characteristics
- Class & type: Balaputradewa-class frigate
- Displacement: 6,626 t (6,521 long tons) (full)
- Length: 140 m (459 ft 4 in)
- Beam: 19.75 m (64 ft 10 in)
- Propulsion: CODAD propulsion system
- Speed: 28 knots (52 km/h; 32 mph)
- Range: 9,000 nmi (17,000 km; 10,000 mi)
- Endurance: 21 days
- Complement: 143
- Sensors & processing systems: CMS: Havelsan ADVENT CMS; Radar: Aselsan CENK 350-N (Mete Han) multi-function phased array radar; Aselsan CENK 400-N surveillance radar; Aselsan AKR-D fire control radar; Aselsan MAR-D helicopter control radar; Sonar: Aselsan FERSAH hull mounted sonar; IFF: Leonardo IFF system
- Electronic warfare & decoys: Elettronica RESM and RECM; Aselsan HIZIR torpedo countermeasures system; 2 × 8 130 mm Aselsan KARTACA-N decoy launcher systems
- Armament: 2 × Otomelara 76/62 Super Rapid main guns; 1 × 35 mm Rheinmetall Oerlikon Millennium Gun CIWS; 2 × 12.7 mm Leonardo Lionfish RCWS; 64 × Roketsan MİDLAS VLS for; HISAR MR and SIPER LR surface-to-air missile; Atmaca anti-ship missiles; 2 x 3 324 mm Leonardo B515/3 torpedo launchers
- Aircraft carried: 1 × medium-sized helicopter
- Aviation facilities: helicopter deck and hangar

KRI Balaputradewa (322) is the lead ship of the Balaputradewa-class frigate of the Indonesian Navy. Built by PAL Indonesia shipyard based on Babcock International's Arrowhead 140 design, it is the first frigate to be wholly constructed in Indonesia.

== Design and description ==
Balaputradewa has a length of 140 m (460 ft), a beam of 19.75 m (64.8 ft) and displacement of 6,626 long tons (6,732 t) at full load. The ship is powered by combined diesel and diesel (CODAD) propulsion system, generating speed of up to 28 knots (52 km/h) at full load and has a range of 9,000 nautical miles (17,000 km) while cruising at 18 knots (33 km/h).

The frigate has a complement of 143 personnel and endurance at sea of up to 21 days. The ship could carry up to three helicopters.

== Construction and career ==
The Ministry of Defense of Indonesia ordered the construction of two frigates to the local state-owned shipyard PT PAL Indonesia on 30 April 2020. The ship construction was started on 9 December 2022 with the first steel cut ceremony at PAL Indonesia shipyard in Surabaya. The frigate's keel was laid down on 25 August 2023, with construction number W000304.

During his visit to the shipyard in January 2025, the defense minister Sjafrie Sjamsoeddin planned that the frigate was to be launched in June 2025. As the ship is yet to be launched by the planned time, the Ministry of Defense decided on 24 June 2025 to postpone the launch date to the 27 October 2025. A press release by the House of Representatives in early December 2025 stated that the ship would be launched on 18 December.

The frigate was officially named as KRI Balaputradewa by Mrs. Yayuk Donny Ermawan, spouse of the Deputy Minister of Defense Donny Ermawan Taufanto, on the night of 18 December 2025. Shortly thereafter, the ship is ceremonially launched at its graving dock in the PAL Indonesia's shipyard. Balaputradewa was then towed out of the Orca Dock for fitting.
