= Balaputradewa-class frigate =

Frigate class of the Indonesian Navy

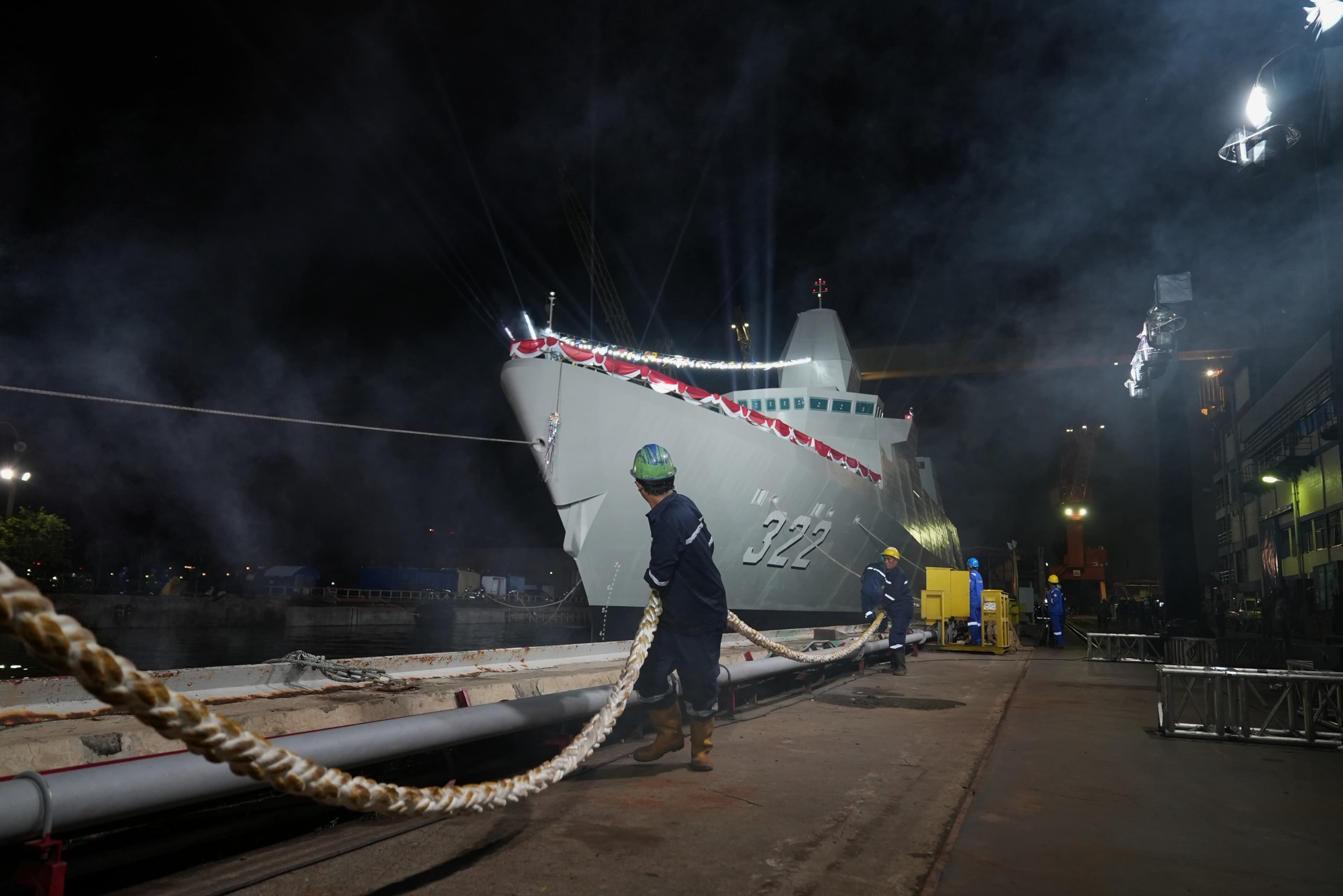
- KRI Balaputradewa at its launching

Class overview
- Name: Balaputradewa-class frigate
- Builders: PT PAL Indonesia
- Operators: Indonesian Navy
- Preceded by: Martadinata-class frigate
- Subclasses: Type 31 frigate
- Built: 2022–present
- Planned: 4
- Building: 2
- Completed: 0

General characteristics
- Type: Frigate
- Displacement: 6,626 t (6,521 long tons) (full)
- Length: 140 m (459 ft 4 in)
- Beam: 19.75 m (64 ft 10 in)
- Propulsion: CODAD propulsion system
- Speed: 28 knots (52 km/h; 32 mph)
- Range: 9,000 nmi (17,000 km; 10,000 mi)
- Endurance: 21 days
- Complement: 143
- Sensors & processing systems: CMS: Havelsan ADVENT CMS; Radar: Aselsan CENK 350-N (Mete Han) multi-function phased array radar; Aselsan CENK 400-N surveillance radar; Aselsan AKR-D fire control radar; Aselsan MAR-D helicopter control radar; Sonar: Aselsan FERSAH hull mounted sonar; IFF: Leonardo IFF system
- Electronic warfare & decoys: Elettronica RESM and RECM; Aselsan HIZIR torpedo countermeasures system; 2 × 8 130 mm Aselsan KARTACA-N decoy launcher systems
- Armament: 2 × Otomelara 76/62 Super Rapid main guns; 1 × 35 mm Rheinmetall Oerlikon Millennium Gun CIWS; 2 × 12.7 mm Leonardo Lionfish RCWS; 64 × Roketsan MiDLAS vertical launching system for; HISAR MR and SIPER LR surface-to-air missile; Atmaca anti-ship missiles; 2 x 3 324 mm Leonardo B515/3 torpedo launchers
- Aircraft carried: 1 × medium-sized helicopter
- Aviation facilities: helicopter deck and hangar
- Notes: Source

The Balaputradewa-class frigate (previously known as Fregat Merah Putih, lit. 'Red White Frigate') is a class of frigates being built for the Indonesian Navy. Under construction by PAL Indonesia, it is based on the Odense Maritime Technology (OMT) Iver Huitfeldt-class frigate hull and is marketed under the name Arrowhead 140 or Type 31 frigate. The design was first licensed to Indonesia in September 2021.

== History ==
Ministry of Defense of Indonesia awarded a contract of two frigates to the local state-owned shipyard PT PAL Indonesia on 30 April 2020. The contract stipulated that the frigates would be constructed within 69 months after contract's entry into force.

On 16 September 2021, Babcock announced that it had signed an agreement with PT PAL Indonesia for the export of design license for two Arrowhead 140 frigates, allowing PAL Indonesia to design AH140 derivatives for the Indonesian Navy. The class are known locally as Fregat Merah Putih ("Red-White Frigate").

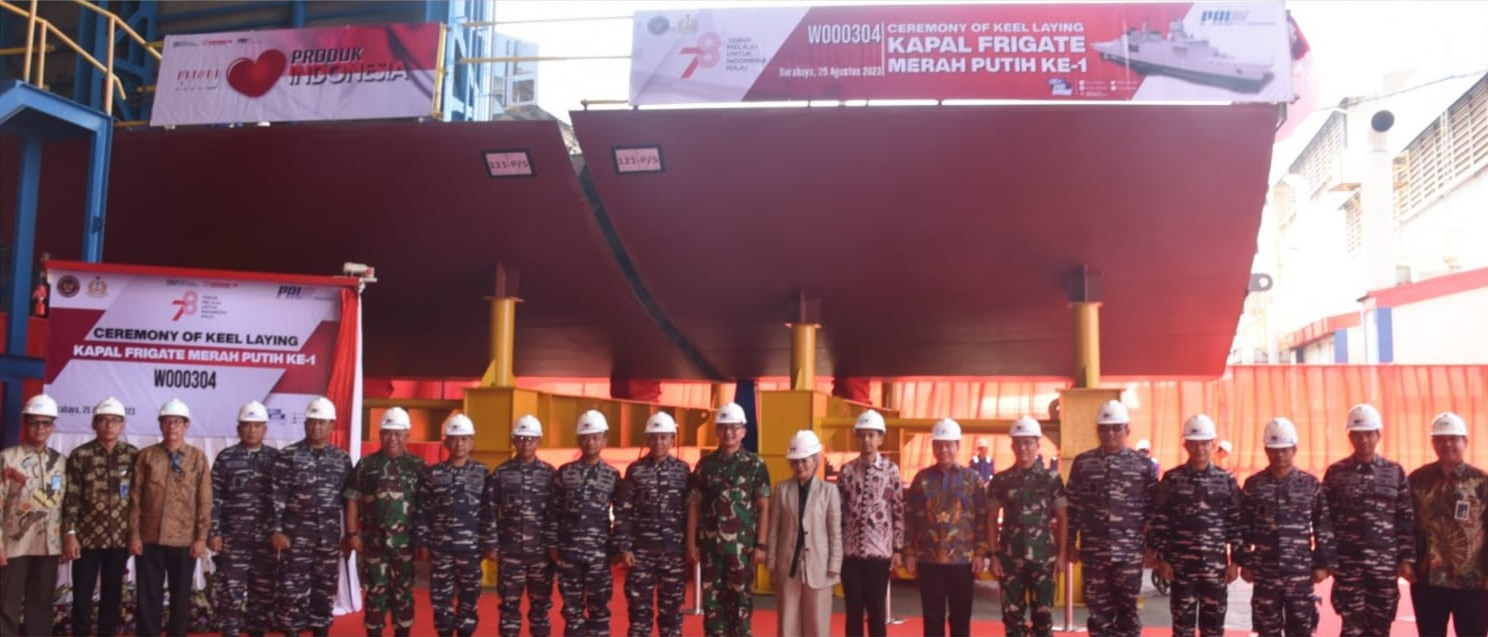
Balaputradewa keel laying ceremony

On 9 December 2022, PAL Indonesia held the first steel cut ceremony for the first Fregat Merah Putih (Red White Frigate) at their shipyard in Surabaya. The first frigate was laid down on 25 August 2023.

The first steel cut of the second Red White frigate was made on 5 June 2024. The second ship was laid down on 15 November 2024, five months earlier from the planned date of March 2025.

In January 2025, the defense minister Sjafrie Sjamsoeddin targeted that the first ship was to be launched in June 2025, with the second ship launched by late 2025.

During a meeting at the Ministry of Defense on 24 June 2025, it was concluded that the earlier target launch date of June 2025 for the first ship cannot be fulfilled, and was postponed to 27 October 2025. The first ship launch delay would not affect the construction progress for the second ship.

The first ship, named as KRI Balaputradewa, was launched on 18 December. At the same time, the construction progress of the second ship has reached 38%.

During President Prabowo Subianto's visit to the United Kingdom on 21 January 2026, a letter of intent was signed for the sale of licenses for two additional Arrowhead 140 frigates to Indonesia. PAL Indonesia expects the contract for the third and fourth frigates to be signed in 2026. The third and fourth ships are planned to have enhance combat capabilities, while retaining the dimension, propulsion system, and general combat system architecture of the previous ships.

== Armaments and sensors ==
As part of the main contract, the Red White Frigate is to be armed with one OTO Melara 76 mm, one 35 mm Rheinmetall Oerlikon Millennium Gun, and two 12.7 mm Leonardo Lionfish RCWS, while the electronics and sensors includes Aselsan Mete Han / CENK-350-N AESA multi-function radar, Aselsan MAR-D / CENK-200-N air and surface surveillance and helicopter control radar, Aselsan FERSAH hull-mounted sonar, Aselsan Target Designation Sight, HAVELSAN ADVENT combat management system, HAVELSAN-made combat information center equipment, two 8x6 130 mm Aselsan KARTACA-N decoy launching systems, IFF system from Leonardo, and Elettronica electronic warfare suite.

Additional equipment in "fitted for-but not with" (FFBNW) configuration includes additional single OTO Melara 76 mm gun, additional two 12.7 mm Leonardo Lionfish RCWS, 8x8 cells (total 64 cells) Roketsan MİDLAS vertical launching system (VLS) for surface-to-surface and surface-to-air missiles, two Leonardo B515/3 triple 324mm torpedo launchers for MU90 LWT torpedoes, and Aselsan CENK 400-N AESA long-range air and surface surveillance radar. The procurement contract for FFBNW equipment was signed by PAL Indonesia on 11 June 2025.

== Ships of the class ==
Name	Pennant No.	Builder	Ordered	First steel cut	Laid down	Launched	Commissioned	Status
KRI Balaputradewa	322	PAL Indonesia, Surabaya Babcock International, Rosyth	30 April 2020	9 December 2022	25 August 2023	18 December 2025	Projected 2028/2029	Fitting out
KRI TBA		PAL Indonesia, Surabaya Babcock International, Rosyth	30 April 2020	5 June 2024	15 November 2024		Projected 2028/2029	Under construction
KRI TBA		PAL Indonesia, Surabaya Babcock International, Rosyth	21 January 2026					Planned
KRI TBA		PAL Indonesia, Surabaya Babcock International, Rosyth	21 January 2026					Planned

== See also ==
- List of active Indonesian Navy ships
