= Tarlac (disambiguation) =

Tarlac may refer to:

== Places in the Philippines ==
- Tarlac Province
- Tarlac City
- Tarlac River

== People ==
- Dragan Tarlać, basketball player

== Other uses ==
- BRP Tarlac, ships of the Philippine Navy
