= BRP Tarlac (LD-601) =

Philippine Navy landing platform ship

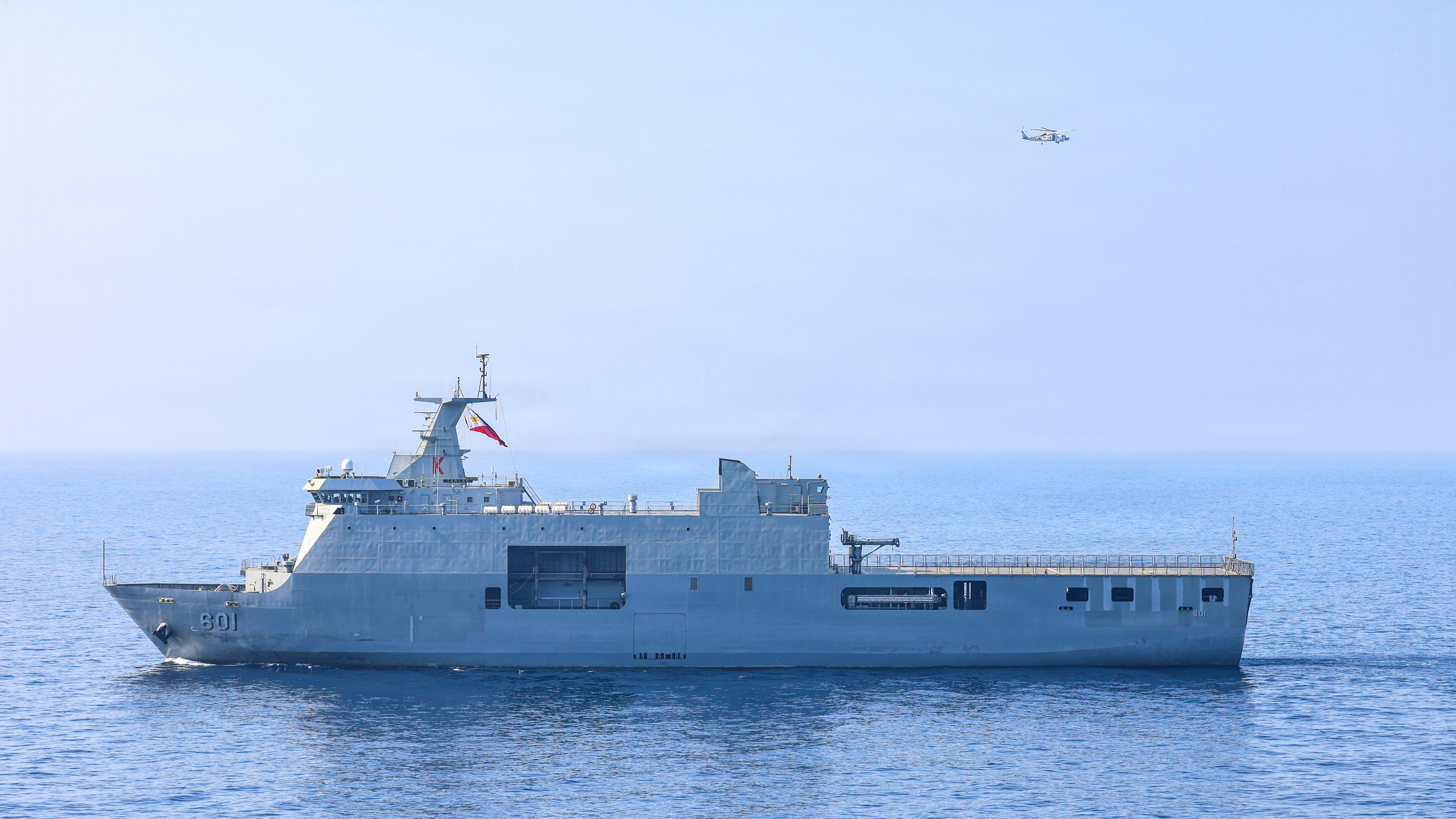
- BRP Tarlac (LD601) sailing during the group sail phase of the Exercise Balikatan 2026

Philippines
- Name: BRP Tarlac
- Namesake: Province of Tarlac
- Ordered: 29 August 2013
- Builder: PT PAL Indonesia
- Laid down: 5 June 2015
- Launched: 18 January 2016
- Commissioned: 1 June 2016
- Identification: LD-601; IMO number: 9745639; MMSI number: 548118500; Callsign: 4DIIF
- Status: In active service
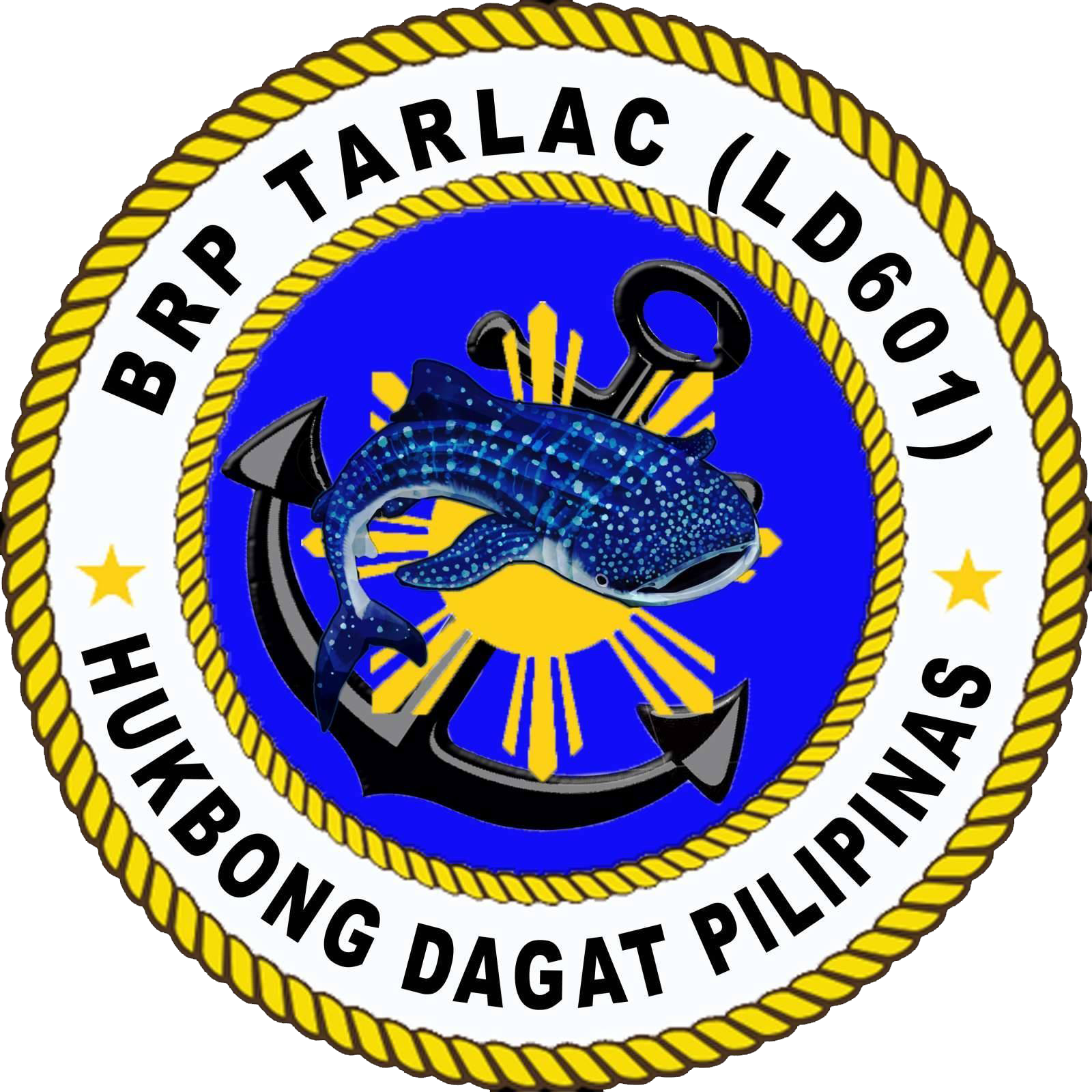
- Badge

General characteristics
- Class & type: Tarlac-class landing platform dock
- Displacement: Standard: 7,200 tons; Full load: 11,583 tons
- Length: 123 m (403.5 ft)
- Beam: 21.8 m (71.5 ft)
- Draft: 5 m (16.4 ft)
- Installed power: 1 x MAN D2842 LE301 diesel generator
- Propulsion: Combined diesel and diesel (CODAD) arrangement: 2 × MAN-STX 8L27/38 diesel engines, each producing 3,915 bhp (2,920 kW)
- Speed: Cruising: 13 kn (24.1 km/h; 15 mph); Maximum: 16 kn (29.6 km/h; 18.4 mph)
- Range: 9360 nmi (17334.7 km)
- Endurance: 30 days
- Boats & landing craft carried: 2 × LCU or LCM at floodable well decks; 2 × RHIB or LCVP at boat davits
- Capacity: 500 troops plus associated vehicles and equipment
- Complement: 121 crew
- Sensors & processing systems: Furuno X-band & S-band navigation radars; Combat management system (planned); Surface search radar (planned); Air search radar (planned); Electro-Optical Fire Control System (planned)
- Electronic warfare & decoys: Electronic Warfare Suite (planned)
- Armament: 1 × 76mm main gun on the foredeck (planned); 2 × 25mm secondary guns, one each on the port and starboard sides (planned); 6 x .50cal (12.7mm) guns
- Aircraft carried: 1 × AW109E Power naval helicopter
- Aviation facilities: Hangar for 1 medium (10-ton) helicopter; Flight deck for 2 medium (10-ton) helicopters

BRP Tarlac (LD-601) is the lead ship of her class of landing platform docks in service with the Philippine Navy. She is the second ship to be named after the Philippine province of Tarlac, one of the provinces considered to have significant involvement in the Philippine Revolution of independence against Spain.

== History ==
The ship was laid down by the PT PAL shipyard in Surabaya, Indonesia on 5 June 2015, and was launched on 17 January 2016. It underwent sea trials, part of it done during its delivery from Indonesia to the Philippines in May 2016. It was formally welcomed in ceremonies last 16 May 2016, and was commissioned into service with the Philippine Navy on June 1, 2016.

=== Collision incidents ===
While deployed to support anti-Abu Sayyaf blockade operations in Mindanao, BRP Tarlac suffered a collision on the night of 19 September 2016. According to the reports, she was at anchored off 1,000 yards south of Ensign Majini Pier at Naval Station Romulo Espaldon, Zamboanga City when MT Tasco, a Liberian registered tanker drifted into the path of the ship, resulting in a collision before 8pm. There were no reported casualties and she sustained minor damages to the bow, in which it was repaired eventually with assistance from PT PAL Persero.

Another incident took place when BRP Tarlac collided with BRP Gregorio Del Pilar (FF-15) in Pier 15, South Harbour, Manila.

== Operational history ==
During the second week of May 2018, the BRP Tarlac transported the Philippine Military Academy (PMA) Masidlawin class of 2020 to Cagayan de Oro.

=== Marawi Siege ===
During the Marawi War, the ship was used as a launch platform for the AW109's that conducted air strike at enemy positions. It was also used to send and retrieve Naval Special Warfare Group attack crafts.

=== Benham Rise Commemoration ===
In the third week of May 2018, the BRP Tarlac participated in the commemoration for the awarding of the Benham Rise by the United Nations (UN) Tribunal and renaming it to Philippine Rise by hosting the one hundred twenty-six (126) Filipino divers from uniformed agencies and civilian volunteers who installed an underwater flag marker at the shallowest point of the rise.

=== Maritime Training Activity Sama Sama ===
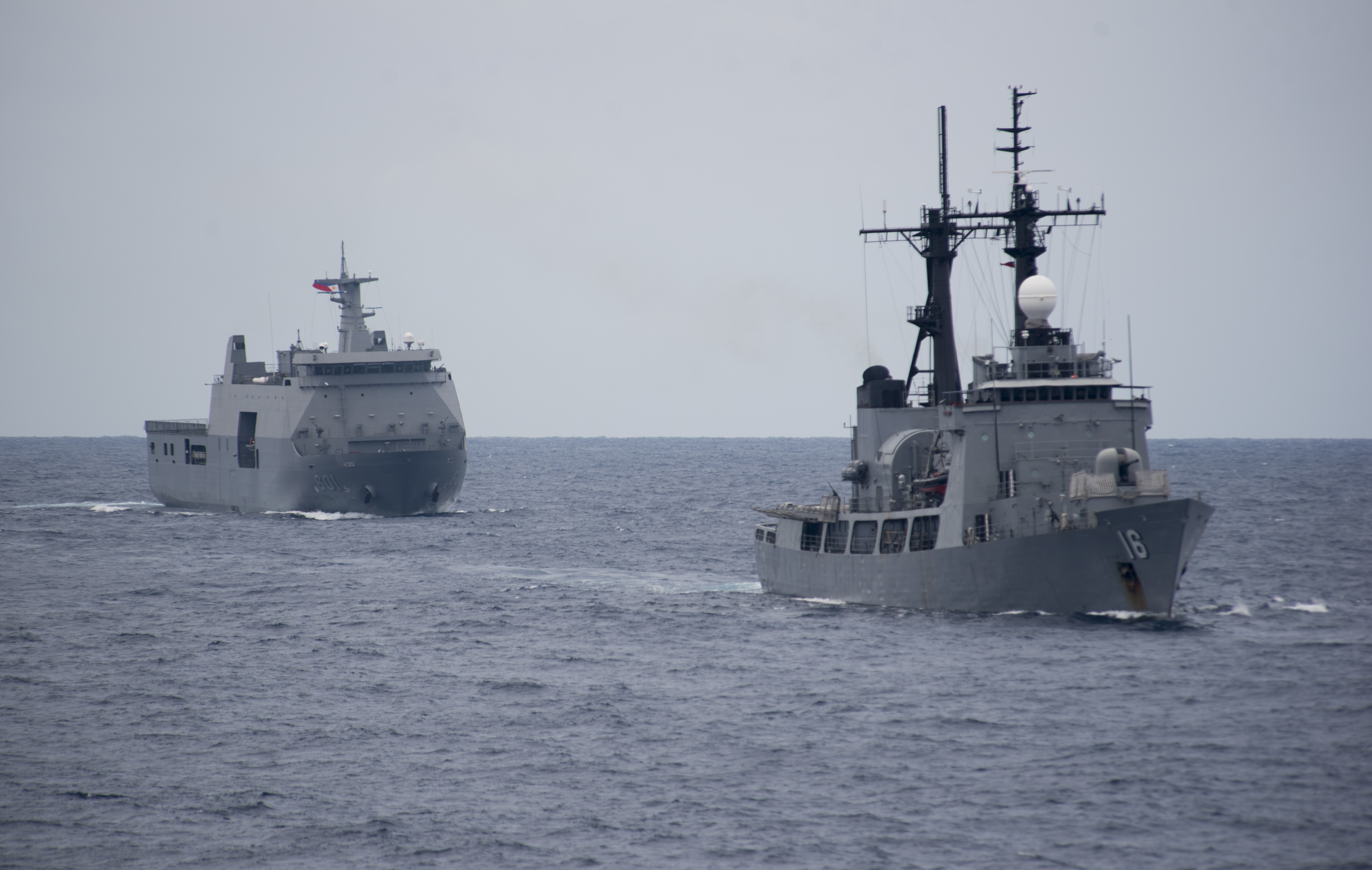
BRP Tarlac (LD-601) and BRP Ramon Alcaraz (PS-16) sail in formation during the at-sea portion of Maritime Training Activity (MTA) Sama Sama 2018.

In July 2018, the BRP Tarlac participated in the Maritime Training Activity (MTA) Sama Sama at Naval Station Ernesto Ogbinar in Pampanga with the US Navy (USN) along with the BRP Ramon Alcaraz (PS-16) patrol vessel. The USN sent the USNS Millinocket (T-EPF-3) Transport Ship, USNS Salvor (T-ARS 52) Salvage Ship and a P-8 Poseidon Aircraft for the exercise.

=== Historic Port Calls ===
- Russia

BRP Tarlac made the Philippine Navy's first-ever port-call to the Russian Federation on 17 September 2018. The port visit to the Russian Pacific Fleet in Vladivostok was estimated to take eight–ten days but the actual visit lasted five days. Afterward, it also participated in the International Fleet Review in Jeju, South Korea. Escorted by both Beijing's China Coast Guard and Tokyo's Japan Coast Guard while near the mutually-claimed Diaoyu/Senkaku Islands, the BRP Tarlac reached Russian waters on 1 October 2018 and was escorted by the Russian Albatros-class anti-submarine vessel Sovetskaya Gavan (P-350).

- South Korea

After the BRP Tarlac's 9 October 2018 departure from Vladivostok, the vessel arrived in the Republic of Korea (South Korea)'s Jeju Island for the first time on 12 October 2018. On board the ship was a 300-man naval contingent composed of the Naval Special Operations Group, Philippine Marine Corps, Technical and Administrative Services, Naval Reserve Command, and a Helicopter Detachment Afloat from the Naval Air Group. Participation in the International Fleet Review and the Western Pacific Naval Symposium were on the agenda.

== Gallery ==
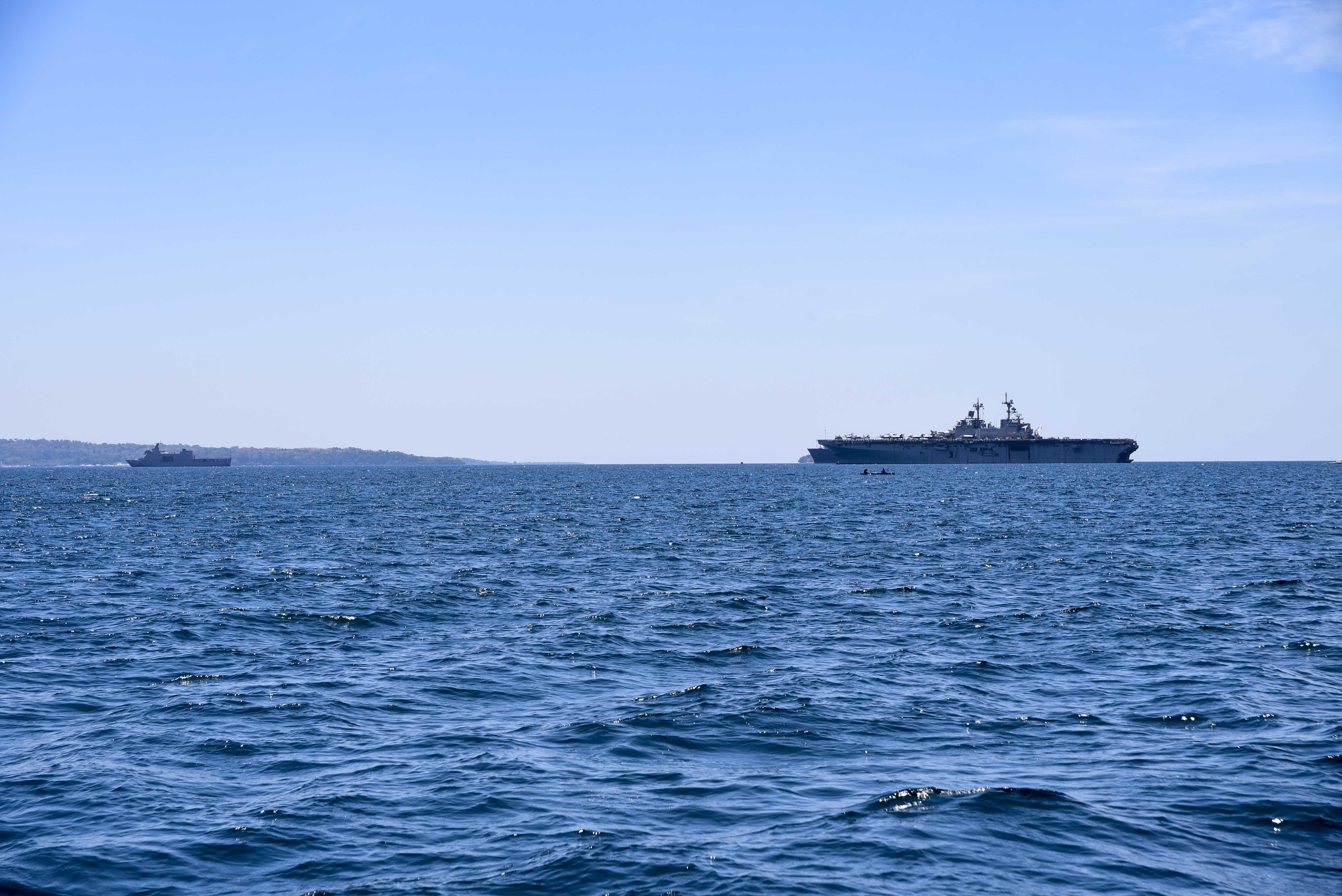
USS Wasp (LHD 1) and BRP Tarlac (LD 601) conduct amphibious operations during Balikatan 2019

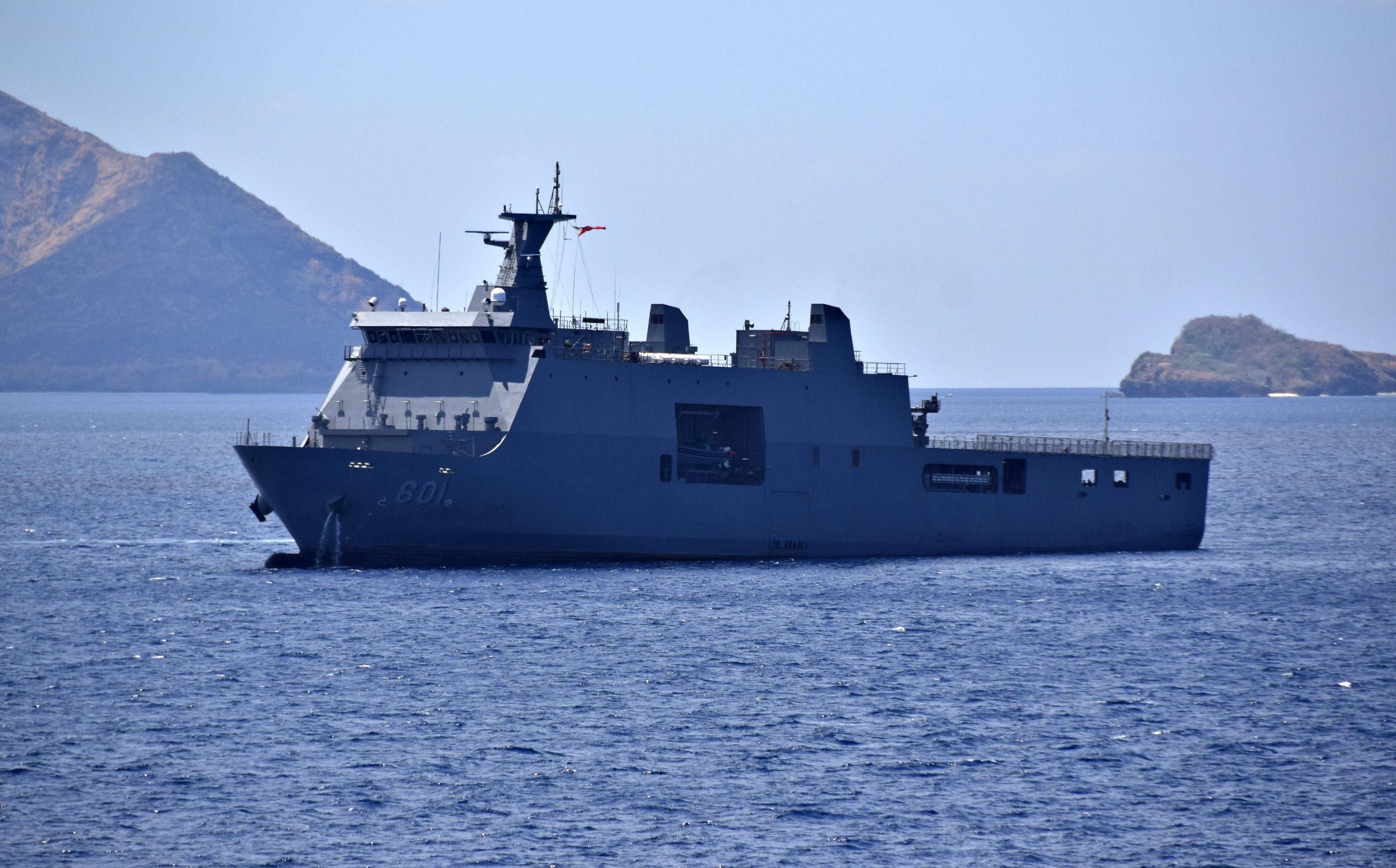
BRP Tarlac (LD 601) conducts amphibious operations during Balikatan 2019 with photo taken from USS Wasp (LHD 1)

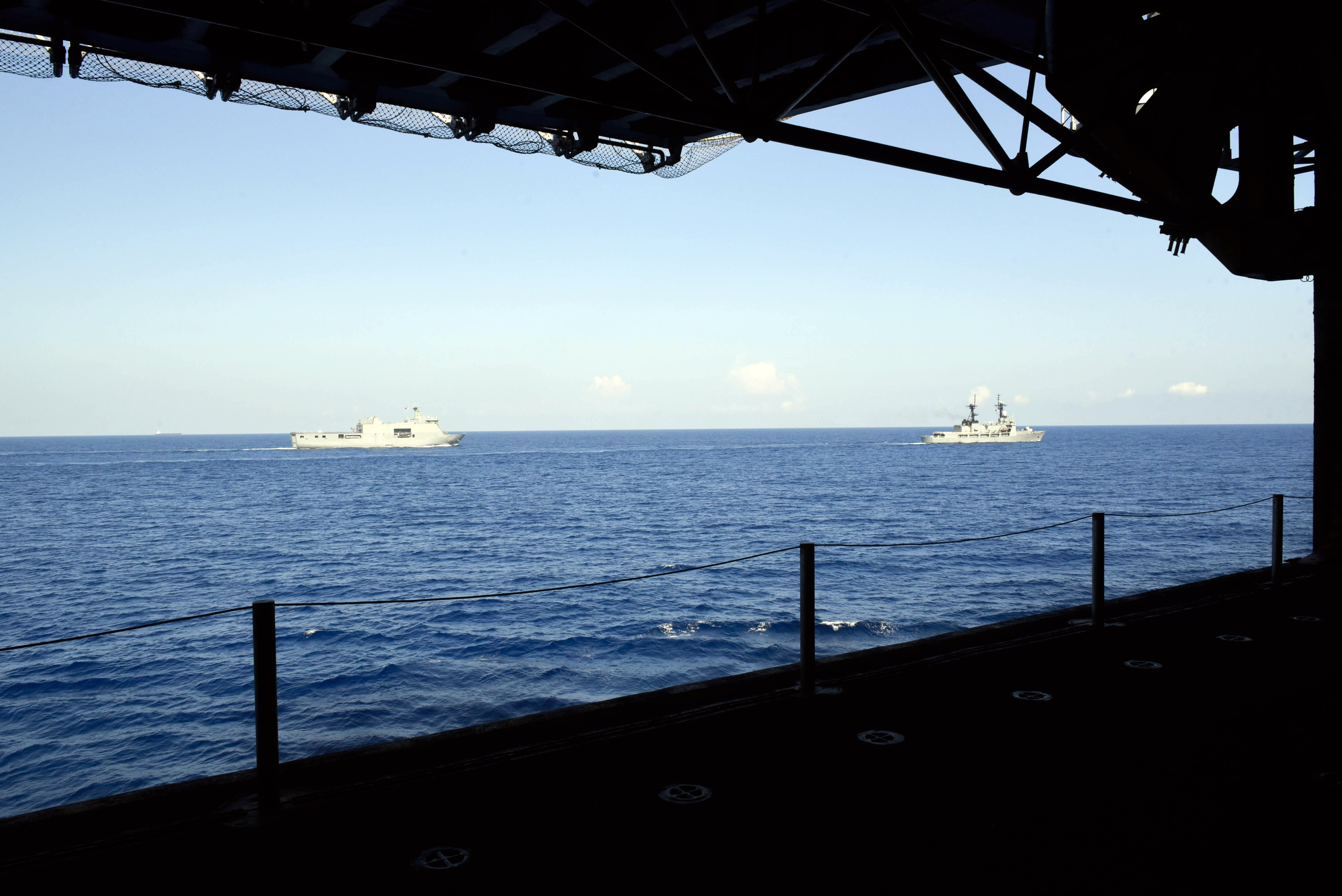
BRP Ramon Alcaraz (FF16) and BRP Tarlac (LD 601) from the USS Wasp (LHD 1) during Balikatan 2019

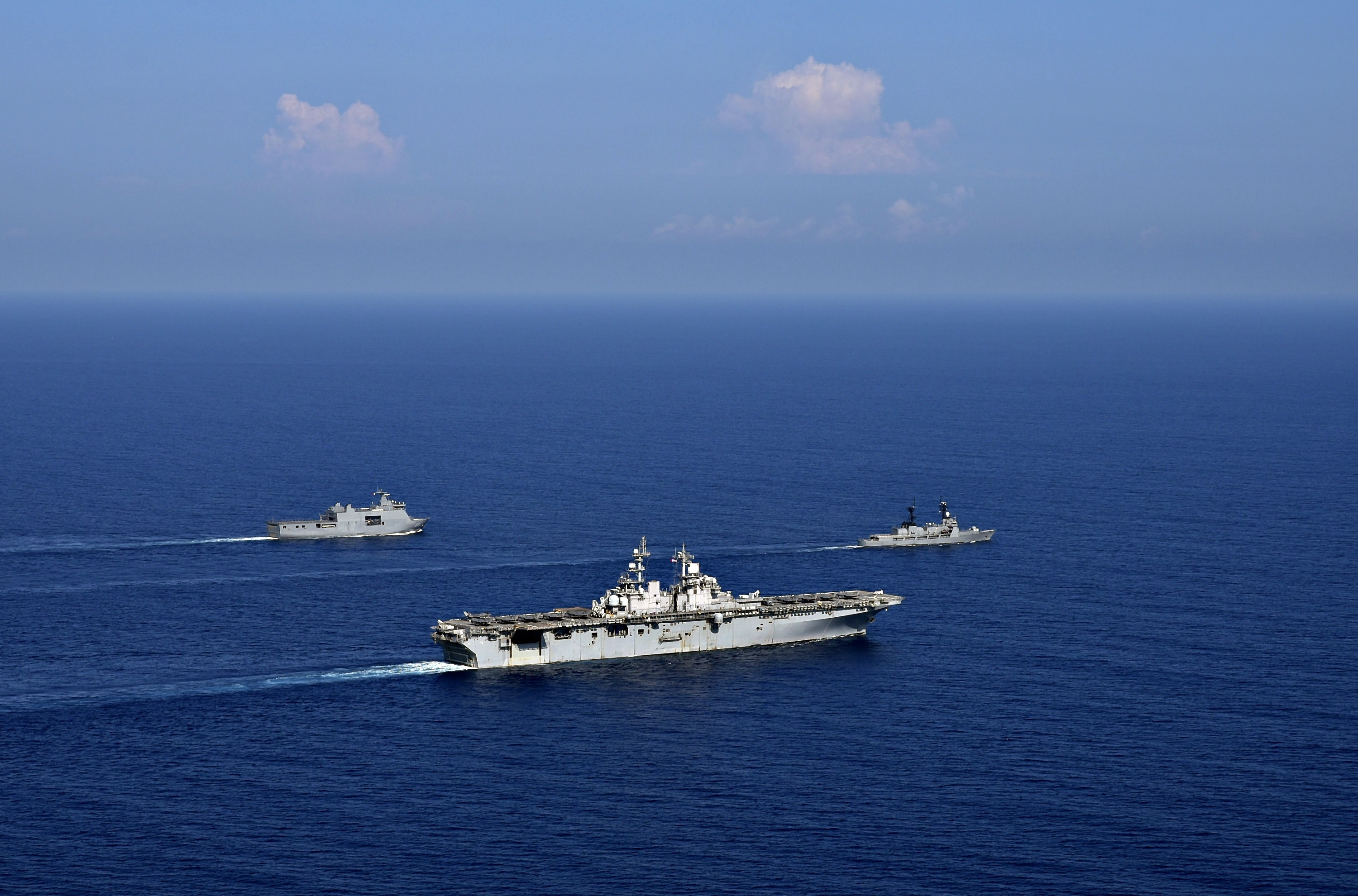
Balikatan 2019 operations with USS Wasp (LHD 1)

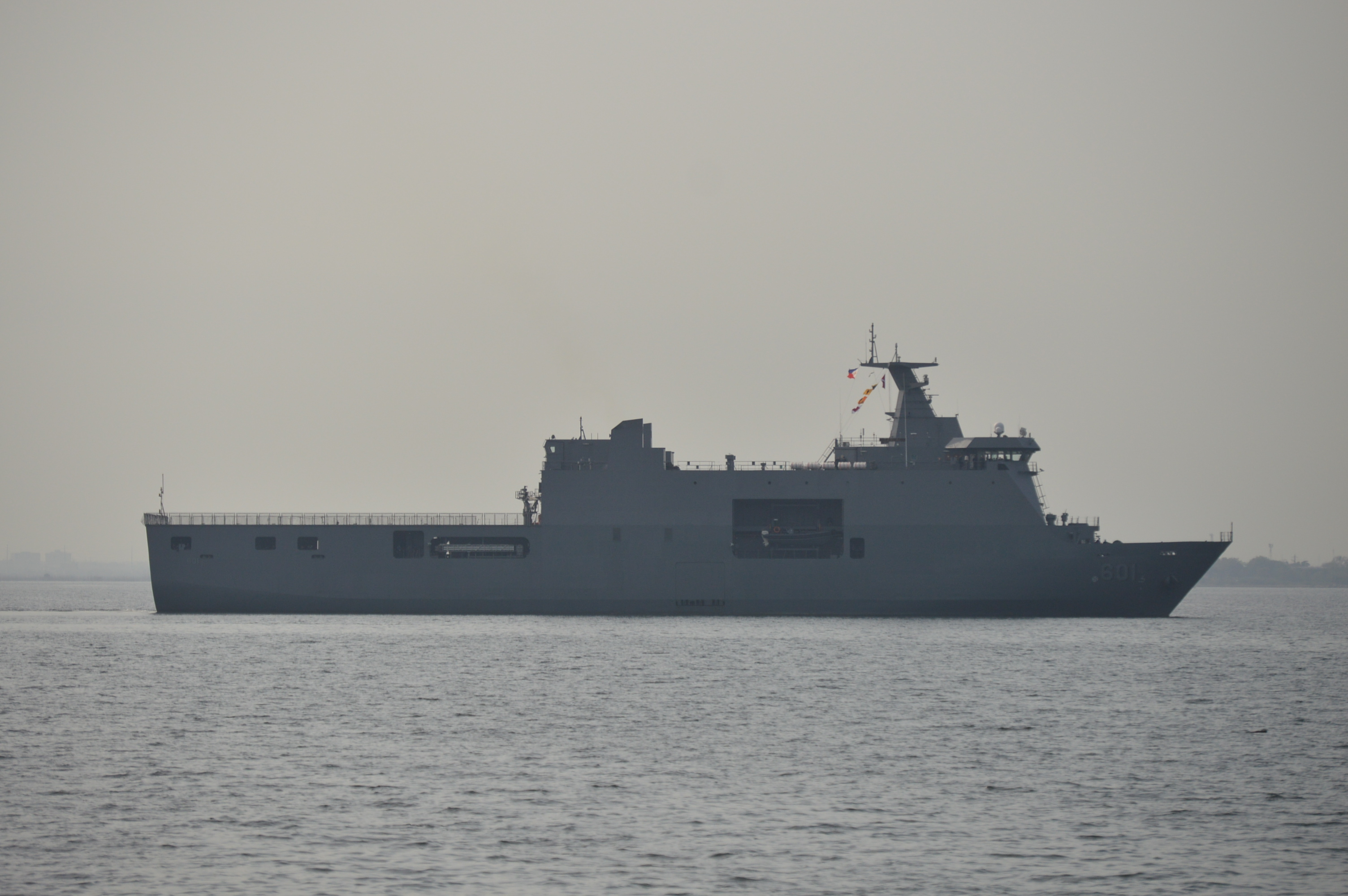
BRP Tarlac off Sangley Point, Cavite.
