= USS LST-47 =

LST-1-class landing ship tank

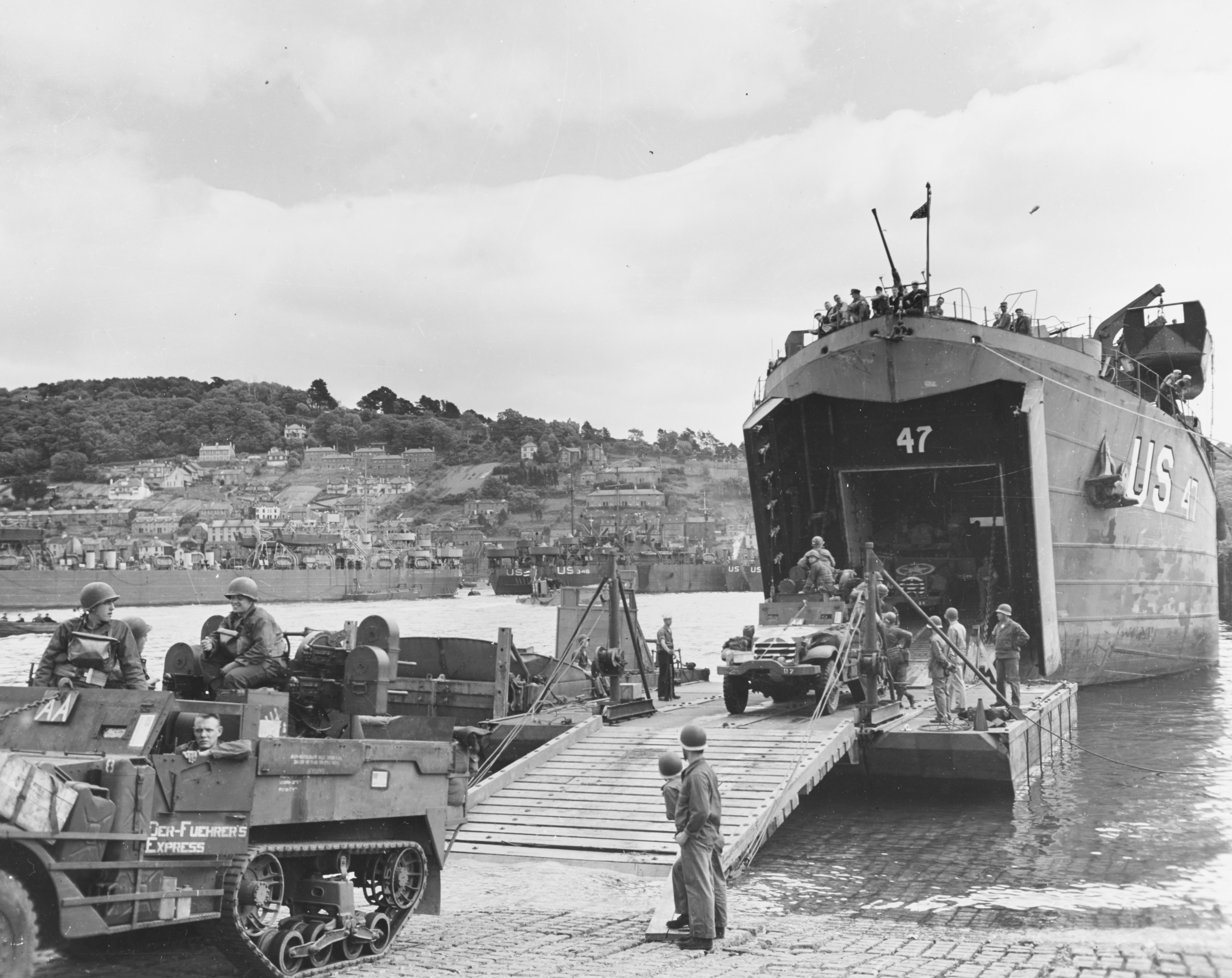
- USS LST-47 on 1 June 1944

History

United States
- Name: LST-47
- Builder: Dravo Corp., Neville Island
- Laid down: 30 July 1943
- Launched: 24 September 1943
- Sponsored by: Mrs. Clarence H. Vant
- Commissioned: 8 November 1943
- Decommissioned: 11 January 1946
- Reclassified: Q007, 11 January 1946; T-LST-47, 31 March 1952
- Stricken: 30 June 1975
- Identification: Callsign: NXUX
- Honors and awards: See Awards
- Fate: Transferred to Philippines, 13 September 1976

Philippines
- Name: Tarlac
- Namesake: Tarlac
- Acquired: 13 September 1976
- Decommissioned: 1980s
- Home port: Subic Bay
- Identification: Hull number: LT-500
- Fate: Presumed scrapped

General characteristics
- Class & type: LST-1-class tank landing ship
- Displacement: 4,080 long tons (4,145 t) full load; 2,160 long tons (2,190 t) landing
- Length: 328 ft (100 m) oa
- Beam: 50 ft (15 m)
- Draft: Full load: 8 ft 2 in (2.49 m) forward; 14 ft 1 in (4.29 m) aft; Landing at 2,160 t: 3 ft 11 in (1.19 m) forward; 9 ft 10 in (3.00 m) aft
- Installed power: 2 × 900 hp (670 kW) Electro-Motive Diesel 12-567A diesel engines; 1,700 shp (1,300 kW)
- Propulsion: 1 × Falk main reduction gears; 2 × Propellers
- Speed: 12 kn (22 km/h; 14 mph)
- Range: 24,000 nmi (44,000 km; 28,000 mi) at 9 kn (17 km/h; 10 mph) while displacing 3,960 long tons (4,024 t)
- Boats & landing craft carried: 2 or 6 x LCVPs
- Capacity: 2,100 tons oceangoing maximum; 350 tons main deckload
- Troops: 16 officers, 147 enlisted men
- Complement: 13 officers, 104 enlisted men
- Armament: Varied, ultimate armament; 2 × twin 40 mm (1.57 in) Bofors guns; 4 × single 40 mm Bofors guns; 12 × 20 mm (0.79 in) Oerlikon cannons

USS LST-47 was a LST-1-class tank landing ship in the United States Navy during World War II. She was transferred to the Philippine Navy as BRP Tarlac (LT-500).

== Construction and career ==
LST-47 was laid down on 30 July 1943 at Dravo Corporation, Neville Island, Pennsylvania. Launched on 24 September 1943 and commissioned on 8 November 1944.

=== Service in the United States Navy ===
During World War II, LST-47 was assigned to the Europe-Africa-Middle theater but later changed to Asiatic-Pacific theater. She then participated in the Invasion of Normandy from 6 to 25 June 1944.

She participated in the invasion of Okinawa and later took occupation there from 26 to 30 June 1945. She assigned to Occupation service in the Far East from 14 to 25 September 1945, 15 to 25 October 1945 and 25 November 1945 to 11 January 1946.

She was decommissioned on 11 January 1946 and came under the Commander Naval Forces Far East (COMNAVFE) Shipping Control Authority for Japan (SCAJAP), redesignated Q007.

Transferred to the Military Sea Transportation Service (MSTS), 31 March 1952, and placed in service as USNS T-LST-47.

LST-47 was struck from the Navy Register on 30 June 1975 and transferred to the Philippines.

=== Service in the Philippine Navy ===
She was acquired by the Philippine Navy on 13 September 1976 and renamed BRP Tarlac (LST-500).

On 21 September 1981, BRP Datu Kalantiaw (PS-76) was caught in the strong wind and heavy seas thus she ran aground off Calayan Point, Cagayan Valley and flipped to her side. The bad weather was caused by the ongoing Typhoon Clara. On the next day as the weather has recovered, BRP Rajah Lakandula (PF-4), BRP Rizal (PS-69), BRP Tarlac (LT-500), BRP Aurora (LT-508), BRP Mactan (TK90) and USS Mount Hood (AE-29) were dispatched to the scene.

The ship was decommissioned in the late 1980s.

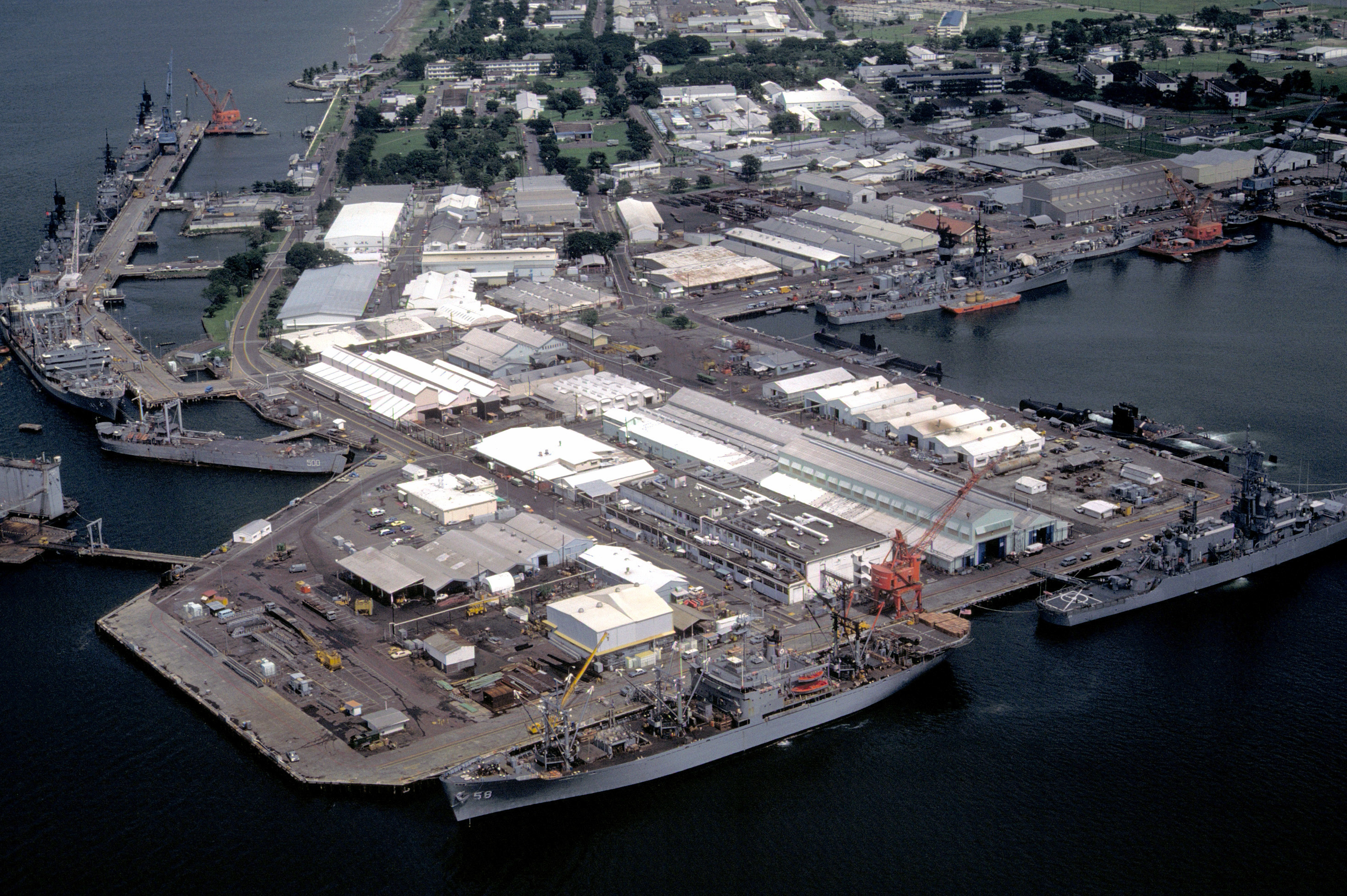
Tarlac (left) in Subic Bay on 28 August 1981

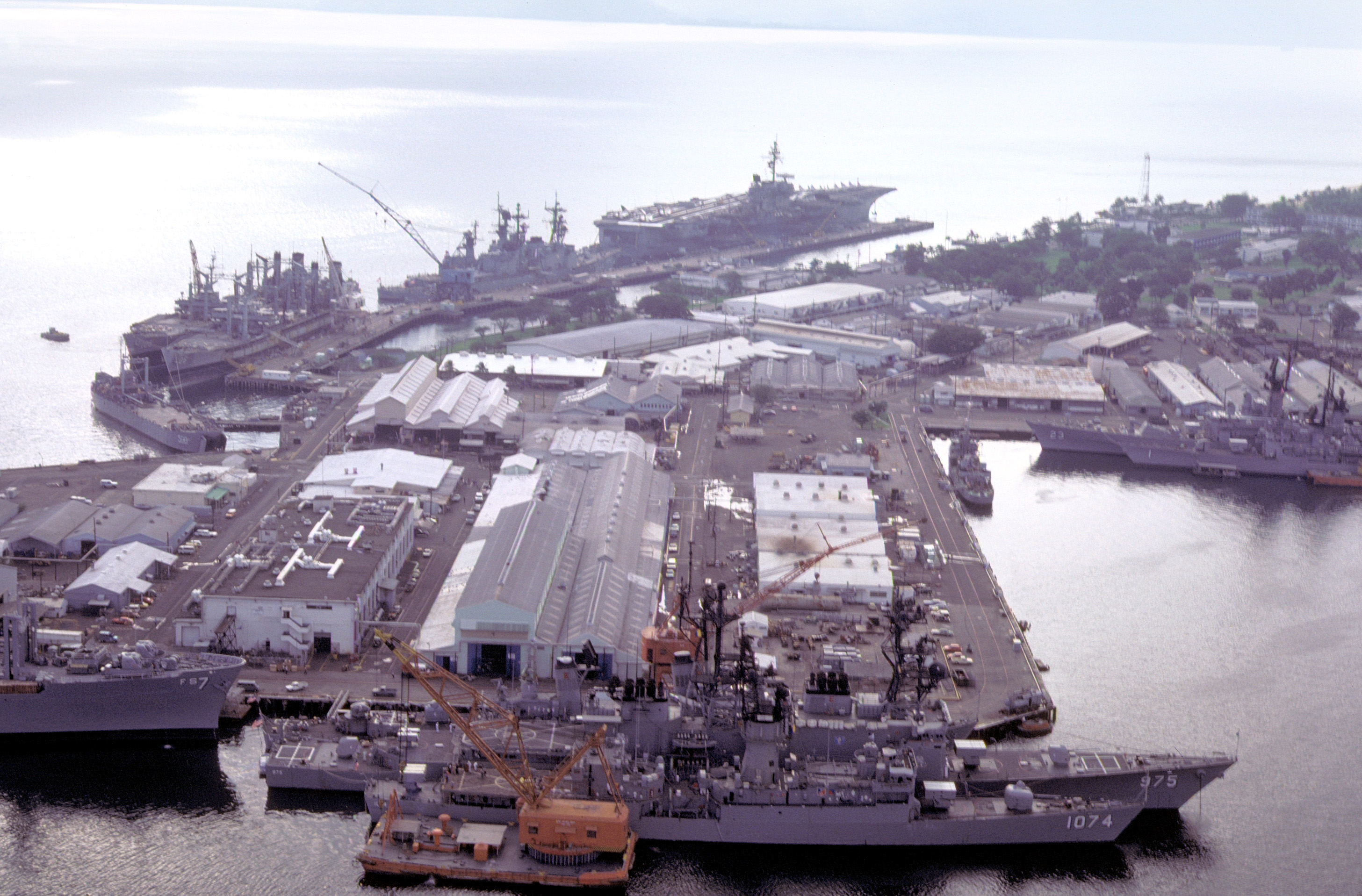
Tarlac (left) in Subic Bay on 19 October 1981

== Awards ==
LST-47 have earned the following awards:

- American Campaign Medal
- Combat Action Ribbon
- European-Africa-Middle East Campaign Medal (2 battle star)
- Asiatic-Pacific Campaign Medal (1 battle star)
- Navy Occupation Medal (with Asia clasp)
- World War II Victory Medal

== Sources ==
- United States. Dept. of the Treasury (1962). Treasury Decisions Under the Customs, Internal Revenue, Industrial Alcohol, Narcotic and Other Laws, Volume 97. U.S. Government Printing Office.
- Moore, Capt. John (1984). Jane's Fighting Ships 1984-85. Jane's Information Group. ISBN 978-0710607959.
- Saunders, Stephen (2009). Jane's Fighting Ships 2009-2010. Jane's Information Group. ISBN 978-0710628886.
- Fairplay International Shipping Journal Volume 222. United Kingdom: Fairplay Publishing Limited. 1967.
