= Tarlac-class landing platform dock =

Philippine Navy amphibious transport ship

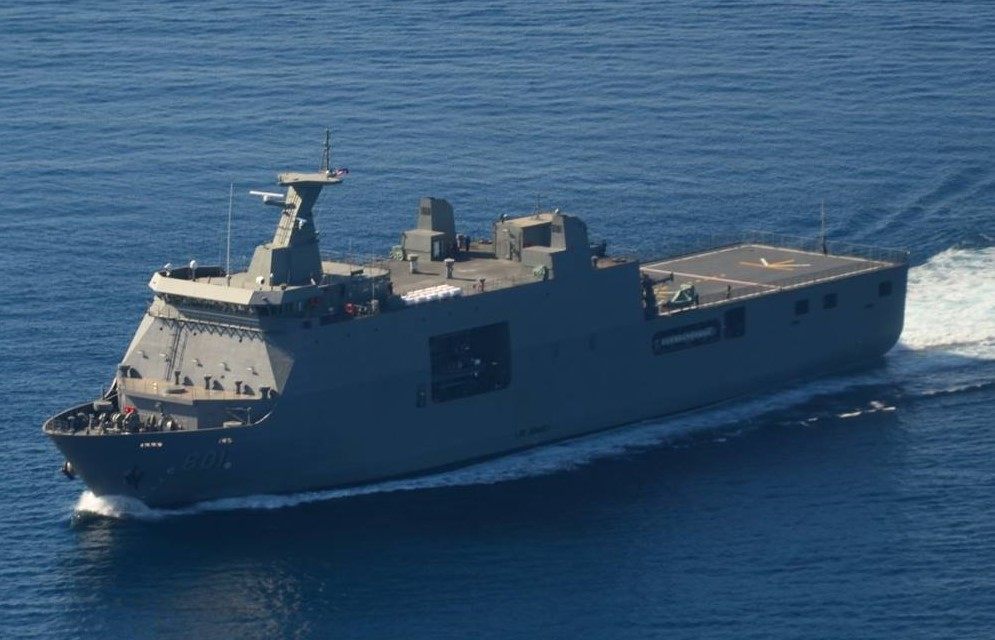
- BRP Tarlac (LD-601) underway in May 2016

Class overview
- Name: Tarlac class
- Builders: PT PAL Indonesia
- Operators: Philippine Navy
- Built: 2015–2017, 2024–Present
- In commission: 2016– present
- Planned: 4
- Building: 2
- Completed: 2
- Active: 2

General characteristics
- Type: Landing Platform Dock
- Displacement: Standard: 7,200 tons; Full load: 11,583 tons
- Length: 123 m (403.5 ft)
- Beam: 21.8 m (71.5 ft)
- Draft: 5 m (16.4 ft)
- Installed power: 1 x MAN D2842 LE301 diesel generator
- Propulsion: Combined diesel and diesel (CODAD) arrangement: 2 × MAN-STX 8L27/38 diesel engines, each producing 3,915 bhp (2,920 kW)
- Speed: Cruising: 13 kn (24.1 km/h; 15 mph); Maximum: 16 kn (29.6 km/h; 18.4 mph)
- Range: 9360 nmi (17334.7 km)
- Endurance: 30 days
- Boats & landing craft carried: 2 × LCU or LCM at floodable well decks; 2 × RHIB or LCVP at boat davits
- Capacity: 500 troops plus associated vehicles and equipment
- Complement: 121 crew
- Sensors & processing systems: Furuno X-band &; Combat management system; Surface search radar; Air search radar; Electro-Optical Fire Control System; Hull-mounted sonar
- Electronic warfare & decoys: Electronic Warfare Suite; 4 × six-tube Terma C-Guard mortar-type decoy launchers
- Armament: 6 x .50cal (12.7mm) guns; 1 × Oto Melara 76mm Super Rapid on foredeck (Only BRP Ilocos Norte and BRP Leyte is only fitted with a 76mm gun); 1 x gun-based CIWS, either Rheinmetall Oerlikon Millennium Gun or Aselsan GOKDENIZ (FFBNW) (Only BRP Ilocos Norte and BRP Leyte is only fitted with a 1 CIWS); 2 × 30mm Aselsan SMASH secondary guns, one each on port and starboard sides (FFBNW) (Only BRP Ilocos Norte and BRP Leyte is fitted 2 × 30mm gun); 8 x .50cal (12.7mm) guns
- Aircraft carried: One × AW109E Power naval helicopter
- Aviation facilities: Hangar for one medium (10-ton) helicopter; Flight deck for two medium (10-ton) helicopters

The Tarlac class are landing platform docks of the Philippine Navy meant for amphibious operations and transport duties in support of the Armed Forces of the Philippines. The class was initially called the "Strategic Sealift Vessel" before being formally named. The ships will also double as a support platform for Humanitarian and Disaster Relief (HADR) and Search & Rescue (SAR) operations.

Two ships were constructed by the PT PAL Indonesia based on the Indonesian Navy's Makassar class. Construction of the first unit already started in January 2015 and was delivered in July 2016, while the second unit started a few months after and delivered by 2017 after going through sea trials. The lead ship was launched on 17 January 2016 as BRP Tarlac. The second ship was delivered on 10 May 2017 and named as the BRP Davao del Sur.

The Philippine Navy reported in June 2022 that a future version of the Tarlac-class was ordered. The orders were made and funded under the Landing Docks Acquisition Project. Delivery dates for both ships are initially scheduled for November 2026 and November 2027, respectively.

== History ==
The original strategic sealift vessel project was based on a proposal to acquire a converted Ro-Ro (Roll On–Roll Off) vessel from Japan, as recommended by the Center of Naval Leadership & Excellence in 2009. Purchase and technical assistance were to be provided by the DBP Maritime Leasing Corporation Inc. (DMLC). It was one of the priority items in the wish list for purchase between 2012 and 2016, presented by the armed forces to the House of Representatives' committee on national defense and security on 26 January 2011. But this project did not push through due to delays in budget allocation and with the ship being offered and sold to another buyer.

Initially a separate project from the Strategic Sealift Vessel, the Department of National Defense (DND) was rushing the acquisition of one or two multi-role vessels (MRV) for the Philippine Navy through government-to-government contract at a cost of 5 to 10 billion pesos. Initially the reported source of the said ships is either South Korea or Singapore. Previous statements and news reports indicated that the multi-role vessels were to be comparable to landing platform docks operated by foreign navies like the Singaporean Endurance class or the Spanish Galicia class. It was later confirmed that the ship would be from South Korea and is a variant of the Indonesian Navy (TNI-AL) Makassar-class LPD, and is packaged with four units Samsung Techwin KAAV-7 amphibious assault vehicles (AAV), two units Daesun 23-meter (75 ft) landing craft utility LCU-23, four units of 9.8-meter (32 ft) rigid-hulled inflatable boats, one unit truck-based mobile hospital, two units Kia KM-250 2 1/2-ton troop trucks, two units Kia KM-450 1 1/4-ton troop trucks, two units Kia KM-450 ambulances, two units Kia Retona 1/4-ton utility vehicles, and one unit forklift/cargo handling equipment.

In May 2011, reports surfaced on the possible acquisition of three landing platform docks from Indonesian shipbuilder PT PAL. This would be of indigenous design and would have no resemblance to the previously constructed model for the Indonesian Navy, the Makassar class, which was of South Korean origin. This would represent another option as South Korea was reportedly pushing for the sale of at least one platform based on the Indonesian Navy Makassar class. As of December 2011, the Philippine Navy was cleared to start negotiations for the ship/s from any friendly nations with a budget of Php 5 billion.

With the cancellation of the original SSV project, the two projects were combined as the strategic sealift vessel, based on the original multi-role vessel parameters and requirements. Based on the "Philippine Fleet Desired Force Mix" strategy concept publicly released in May 2012, the Philippine Navy requires at least four strategic sealift vessels to be available by 2020.

On 24 May 2013, the DND announced the proposed acquisition of two service support vessels (SSVs) worth P2 billion each, describing the ships as vessels smaller than the original MRV requirement but still capable of moving a battalion of troops with their armored vehicle complement, and equipped with helipad and a platform for search and rescue operations which could be fitted with hospital facilities. On 29 August 2013, the DND declared PT PAL of Indonesia as the winner and "lone eligible bidder" with a bid price of Php 3,963,999,520.00. Other firms bought bid documents but did not submit bids.

== Design ==
The design is closely based on the Makassar class of Landing Platform Dock used by the Indonesian Navy, which in turn were actually based on a low-cost LPD design from Korean shipbuilder Daewoo Shipbuilding and Marine Engineering / Daesun Shipyard.

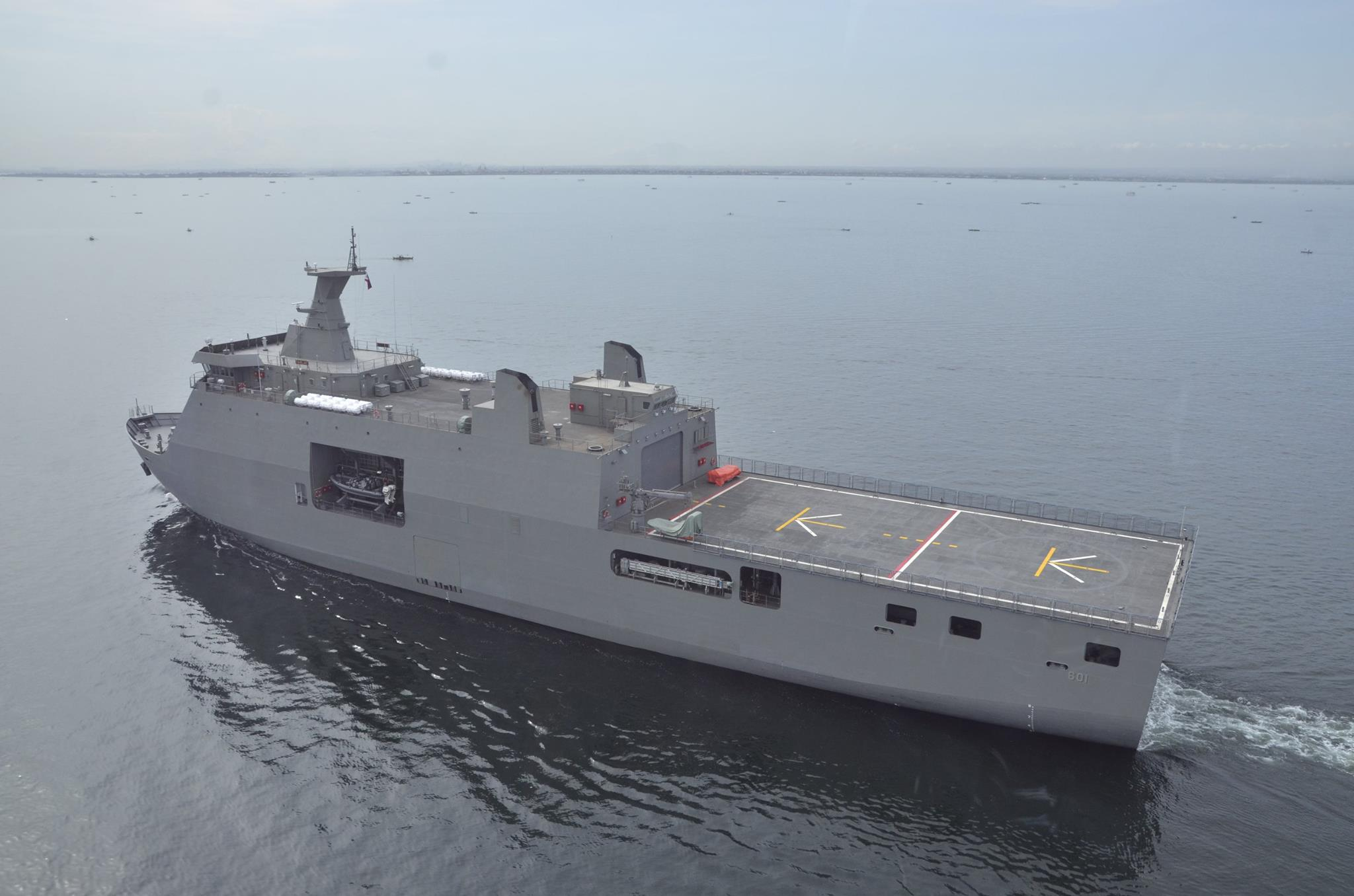
BRP Tarlac underway in Manila Bay

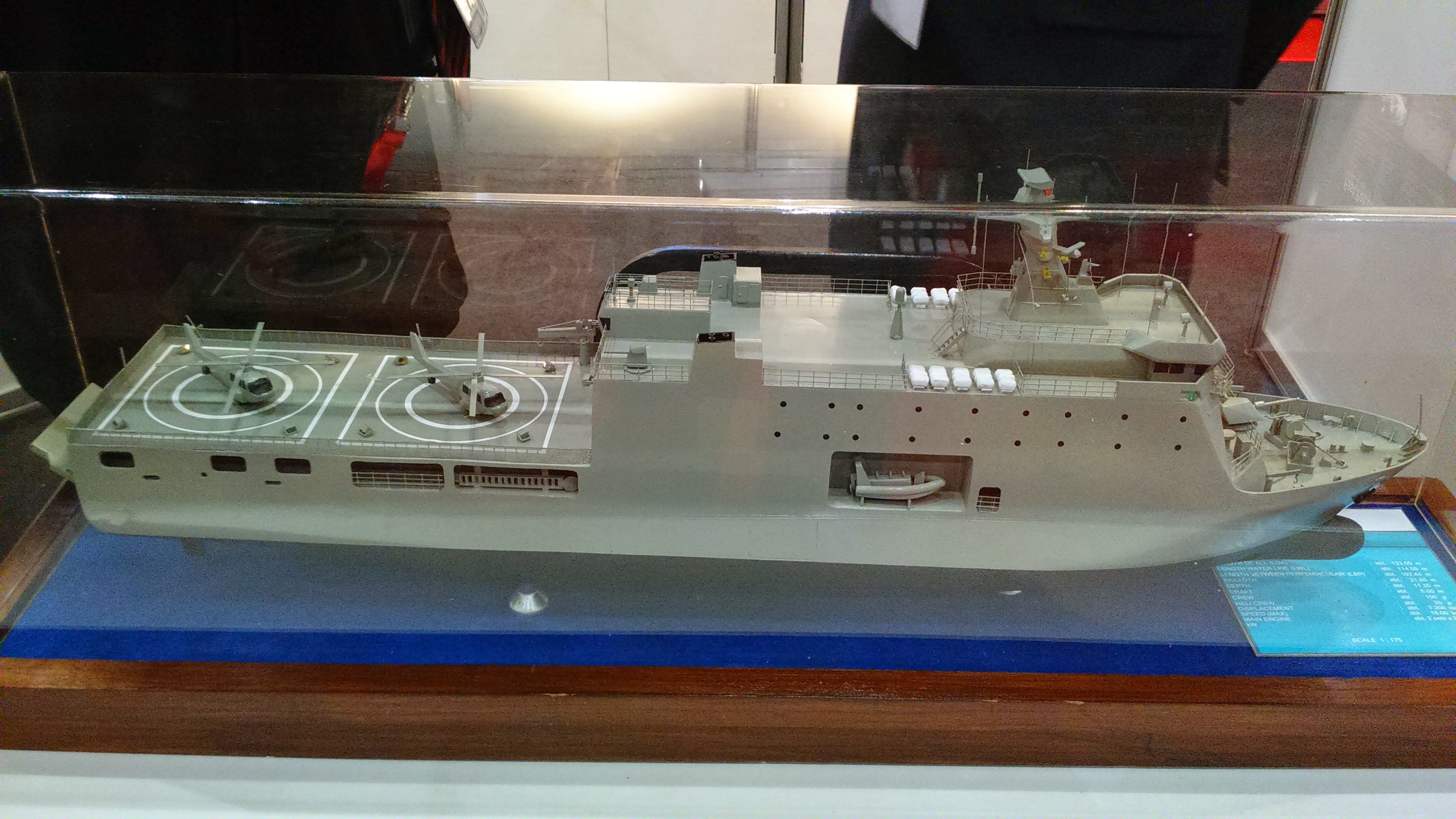
A scale model of Strategic Sealift Vessel presented by PT PAL during ADAS 2014.

=== Communication equipment ===
The communication equipment is supplied by the Portuguese company EID Naval Communications, specifically the ICCS5 communications control system, and Harris RF Communications VLF-HF and V/UHF radios.

=== Propulsion ===
The ships have a Combined Diesel and Diesel (CODAD) layout and will be using similar engines as those used by their Indonesian counterparts, the MAN 9L28/32A medium speed engines. Combined power from the two engines will produce 7,830 brake horsepower (5,840 kW) transferred to two controllable pitch propellers.

=== Armaments ===
PT PAL confirmed that the SSVs will be designed to support one 76-millimeter (3.0 in) (3 in) main gun on the foredeck. Two stern-facing 25 mm (0.98 in) secondary guns will also be fitted, one each on the port and starboard sides. The weapons systems are supposed to be installed separately by the Philippine Navy after delivery. As of 25 October 2019, both vessels are only armed with six manually operated .50-caliber machine guns.

=== Flight support ===
Originally, the ships were designed to accommodate two medium-sized (10-ton) helicopters on the hangar as well as the flight deck, with the specifications emphasizing the US-made Sikorsky Black Hawk helicopter as basis. But changes in the Philippine Navy's requirement later on changed the design to have a hangar for one medium (10-ton) helicopter and a flight deck for two medium (10-ton) helicopters.

== Construction ==
SSV-1 officially started its construction on 22 January 2015 where a first steel cutting ceremony was held in PT PAL's facility in Surabaya, Indonesia. It had entered keel laying works as of 5 June 2015, and was launched as BRP Tarlac (LD-601) on 18 January 2016. Further works and testing will be made until the ship is delivered to the Philippine Navy by May 2016.

The second ship, SSV-2, undertook its first steel cutting ceremonies on 5 June 2015 in PT PAL's Surabaya shipyard. Its keel laying ceremony was held together with the launching of the lead ship on 18 January 2016, and was given a hull number LD-602. The ship reached Manila on 8 May 2017 and was accorded a formal welcome ceremony on 10 May 2017.

== Ships of class ==
Ship name	Hull number	Laid down	Launched	Commissioned	Service	Status
BRP Tarlac	LD-601	22 January 2015	18 January 2016	1 June 2016	Sealift Amphibious Force	Active
BRP Davao del Sur	LD-602	5 June 2015	29 September 2016	31 May 2017	Sealift Amphibious Force	Active
BRP Laoag City	LD-603	22 January 2024	30 June 2026		Sealift Amphibious Force	On order
BRP Leyte	LD-604	29 May 2024			Sealift Amphibious Force	On order

== See also ==
- List of naval ship classes in service
- List of equipment of the Philippine Navy
- Makassar-class landing platform dock
