= PAL Indonesia =

Indonesian state-owned shipbuilder

Coordinates: 7°12′19.53″S 112°44′29.5″E

PT PAL Indonesia

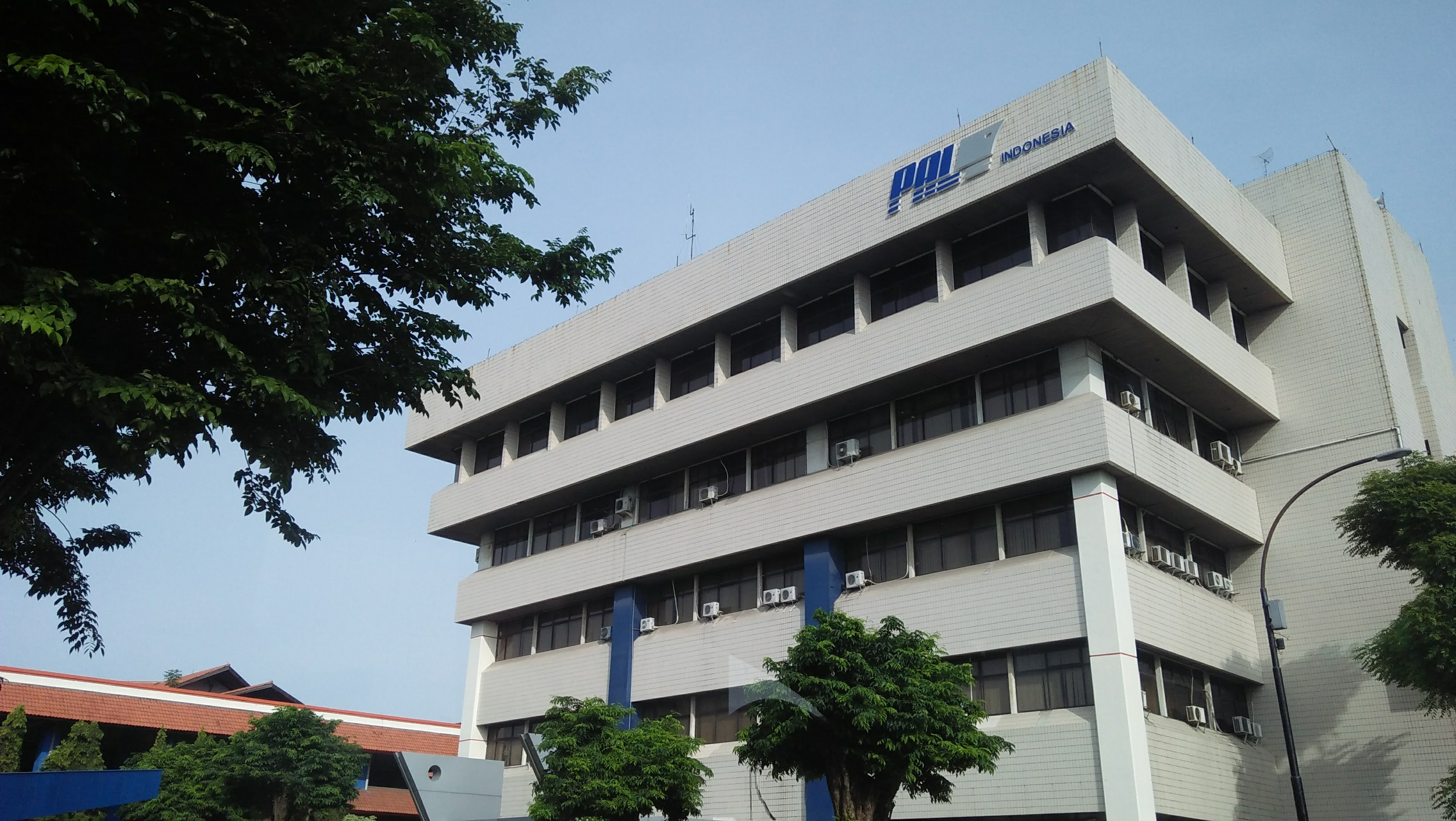
- Headquarters of PT PAL
- Company type: Subsidiary (Perseroan terbatas)
- Industry: Shipbuilding, Defense
- Founded: 1980; 46 years ago
- Headquarters: Surabaya, East Java, Indonesia
- Area served: Worldwide
- Products: Warships, merchant vessels, electrification solutions, submarine
- Revenue: ▲ Rp1.631 trillion (2019)
- Net income: ▲ Rp95.28 billion (2019)
- Total assets: ▲ Rp6.5008 trillion (2019)
- Total equity: ▲ Rp324.52 billion (2019)
- Number of employees: 1638 (2019)
- Parent: PT Len Industri
- Website: pal.co.id
- Footnotes / references Reference

PT PAL Indonesia (formerly abbreviated from Graving Dock dan Penataran TNI Angkatan Laut lit. 'Indonesian Navy Graving Dock and Shipyard') is an Indonesian state-owned enterprise that manufactures ships for military and civilian use and conducts repairs and maintenance on ships and engineering.

== History ==
PT PAL Indonesia (Persero) was established in 1939 as Marine Establishment (ME) by the Dutch East Indies government. During the Japanese occupation, ME was renamed as Kaigun SE 2124. After Indonesia gained independence, the company was nationalized with the company name changed to Penataran Angkatan Laut (PAL).

On April 15, 1980, the company's status was changed from a statutory corporation to a joint-stock company. Its articles of association also states that PAL is no longer bears "Penataran Angkatan Laut", thus the name PAL is standalone. The change of status officially marked as the founding date of PT PAL Indonesia (Persero).

The Philippine Navy ordered its first landing platform/dock-type ship with the BRP Tarlac (LD-601) being made by PT PAL on June 5, 2015, with the ship commissioned into service on June 1, 2016. The contract was around $USD92 million.

On September 29, 2016, PT PAL launched the second Strategic Sealift Vessel (SSV) known as BRP Davao del Sur (LD-602) for the Philippine Navy.

A MoU agreement was signed between PT PAL and Boustead Naval Shipyard to have the Malaysian Navy's first LPD ship constructed in Surabaya on November 6, 2016.

On February 23, 2017, PT PAL has signed an agreement with two UAE shipbuilding companies Abu Dhabi Ship Building (ADSB) and the International Global Group (IGG) in order to boost its presence in the Middle East with the agreement during the 2017 IDEX convention.

On April 15, 2017, an agreement was signed between DCNS and PT PAL to collaborate on building new submarines, corvettes and frigates.

On July 14, 2017, PT PAL has reported that other countries in Africa and Asia have sought orders to create ships for their navies, among them Malaysia, Nigeria, Senegal, Guinea-Bissau and Gabon. Among other orders made by the African countries included Nigeria's order for one SSV; Senegal for one LPD ship along with two Clurit class fast attack craft, KCR-35 meter ships and three KCR-60 meter ships and Guinea-Bissau and Gabon for one KCR-60 meter ship each as of July 18, 2017.

On July 1, 2020, PT PAL was in talks with the United Arab Emirates for a landing platform dock-type ship. On July 4, 2022, PT PAL signed an agreement with the United Arab Emirates to construct a landing platform dock-type ship for the UAE Navy.

On May 31, 2024, PT PAL announced that they signed a contract with a South Asian country during an interview in Surabaya with Commodore (retired) Wiranto that the company will have its first contract for submarine maintenance, repair, and overhaul (MRO).

== Products ==
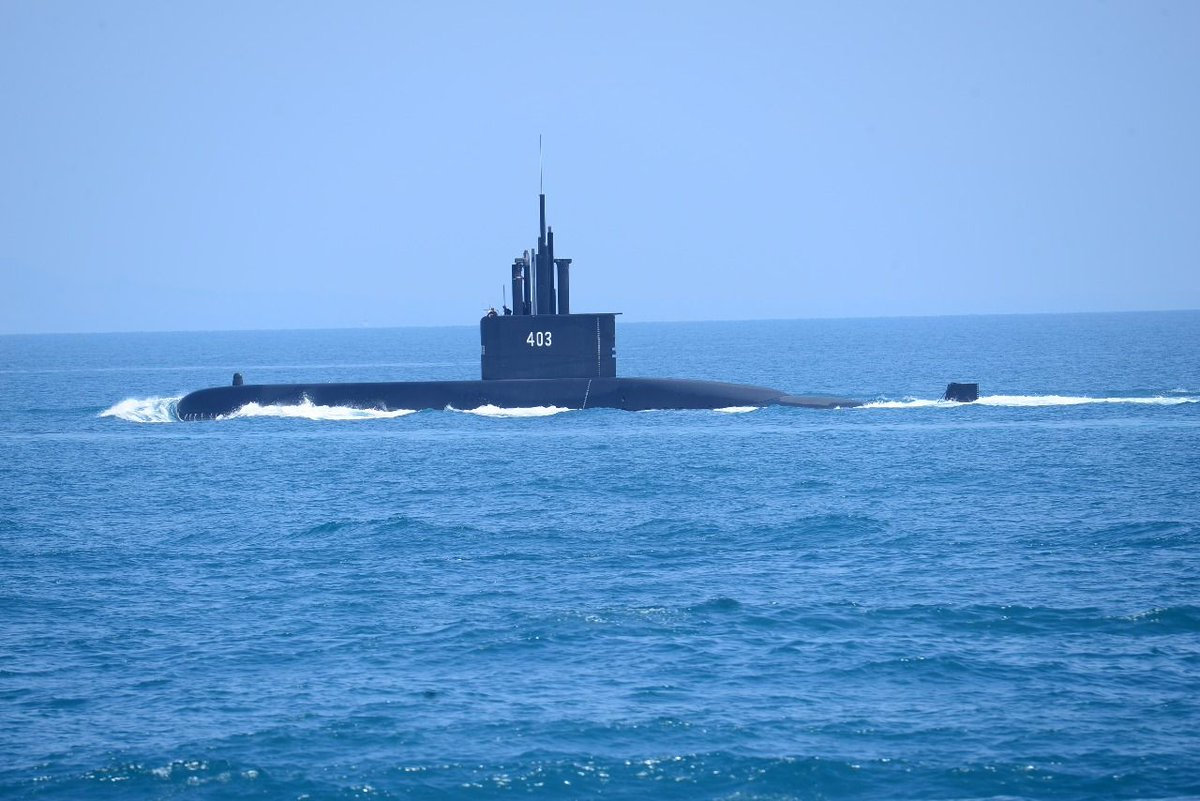
Nagapasa-class submarine 209/1400

=== Warship ===
==== Submarines ====
- Nagapasa-class submarine (First Indonesian joint section built submarine)
- Scorpene class submarine (Licence built from Naval Group)
- Kapal Selam Otonom (KSOT)

==== Landing Platform Dock ====
- Makassar-class landing platform dock
  - Tarlac-class landing platform dock
  - Sudirohusodo-class hospital ship
  - 163 m landing platform dock for the UAE Navy

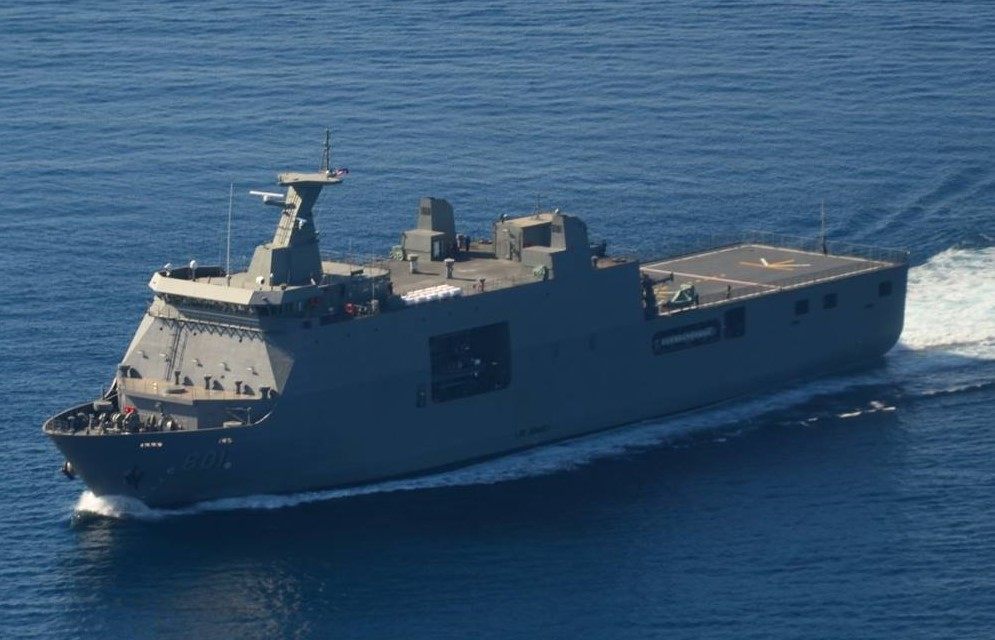
Tarlac-class landing platform dock

==== Frigates ====
- Martadinata-class frigate
- Balaputradewa-class frigate Designed by Babcock International, it is also locally known as Fregat Merah Putih (Red White Frigate).

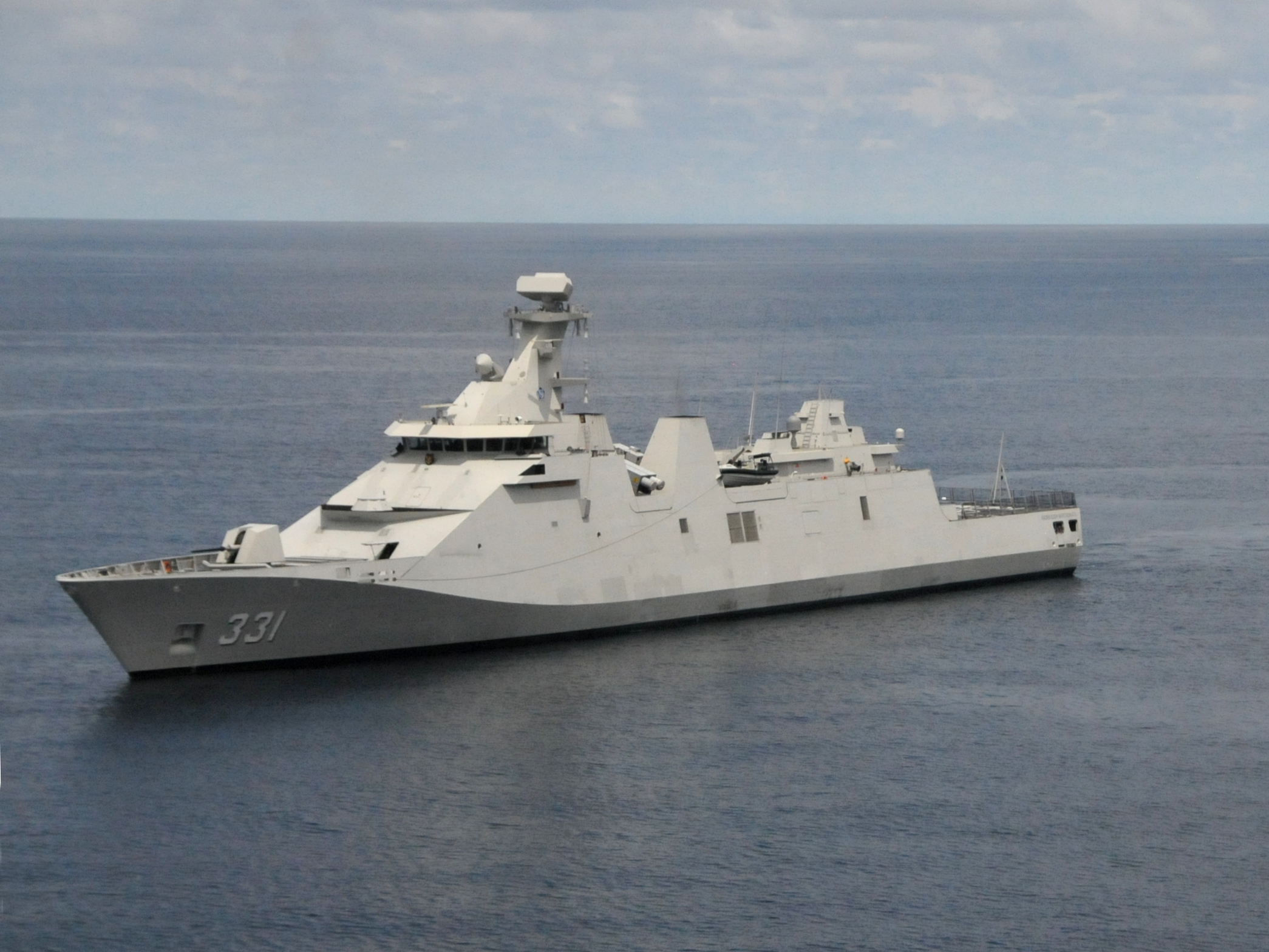
Martadinata-class frigate

==== Fast Attack Craft ====
- Sampari-class 60 Meter Missile Boat

==== Patrol Vessels ====
- Fast patrol craft 14 Meter
- Fast patrol craft 15 Meter
- Fast patrol craft 28 Meter
- Fast patrol craft 38 Meter
- Fast patrol ship 57 Meter

=== Merchant Vessels ===
==== Tanker ====
- Tanker 17,500 LTDW
- Tanker 24,000 LTDW
- Tanker 30,000 LTDW
- Tanker 3,500 LTDW
- Tanker 6,500 LTDW

==== Freighters ====
- STAR 50 – BSBC 50,000 DWT
- STAR 50 – DSBC 50,000 DWT
- OHBC 45.000 DWT STAR
- OHBC 45.000 DWT
- Cargo Vessel 3,500 DWT
- Cargo Vessel 3,650 DWT
- Container Ship 1,600 TEU'S
- Container Ship 400 TEU'S
- Container Vessel 4,180 DWT
- Dry Cargo Vessel 18,500 DWT
- Anchor Handling Tug Supply Vessel 5,400 BHP

==== Passenger Ships ====
- Ferry
- Passenger vessels with capacity u to 500 pax

==== Fishing Boats ====
- Long line Tuna fishing vessel with capacity of up to 60 GT

=== Leisure Vessels ===
==== Yachts ====
- PAL Motor Yacht 28 meter

=== General Engineering ===
- Barge Mounted Power Plant
- INA-TEWS (Tsunami Early Warning System)
