= 2017 in Philippine law and politics =

The following are the events in related to Philippine law in 2017. This includes developments in criminal investigations of national notability.

== Events ==
=== Kidnapping and killing of Jee Ick-Joo ===
- January 10 – Barangay 165, Caloocan chairman Gerardo Santiago, who owns Gream Funeral Services, the funeral parlor where Jee Ick-joo's remains were found, filed a leave of absence from January 10 to February 10, according to Caloocan Mayor Oscar Malapitan.
- January 11 – Santiago flew to Vancouver, Canada.
- January 12 – Choi Kyung-jin offered a ₱100,000 reward to anyone who can give information on her husband's whereabouts.
- January 17
  - The NBI went to Gream Funeral Services, where the body of Jee was believed to have been brought. His remains were cremated and his ashes were flushed down the toilet.
  - Staff of Gream Funeral Services were brought in by the NBI for questioning.
- January 18 – the crematorium staff of St. Nathaniel Crematory in La Loma, Caloocan say they only learned that 'Ruamar Salvador' was actually Jee, when agents from the NBI paid a visit to the crematorium.
- January 19
  - Gen. dela Rosa confirmed that Jee was killed at Camp Crame.
  - The Department of Justice (DOJ) recommended the filing of kidnapping for ransom with homicide charges against SPO3 Ricky Sta. Isabel, SPO4 Roy Villegas, Ramon Yalung, and several John Does in connection with the abduction and death of Jee. Justice Secretary Vitaliano Aguirre said Thursday high-ranking officials of the PNP may be involved in the kidnapping of Jee.
- January 20 – Angeles City Regional Trial Court (RTC) Branch 58 issued an arrest warrant for SPO3 Sta. Isabel, SPO4 Roy Villegas, Ramon Yalung, and four others only known under the aliases "Pulis", "Jerry", "Sir Dumlao", and "Ding".
- January 22 – Presidential Spokesperson Ernesto Abella said there would be "no whitewash or cover-up" in the probe into the killing of Jee.
- January 23 – in an affidavit, SPO3 Sta. Isabel implicated Supt. Dumlao and Senior Superintendent Allan Macapagal of the PNP AKG.
- January 24 – the Philippine government apologized for the death of Jee at the hands of local police. President Rodrigo Duterte conveys his sympathies to Jee's widow, Choi Kyung-jin.
- January 26
  - President Duterte apologized to Korean investors and Korean Ambassador to the Philippines Kim Jae-Shin for the kidnapping and killing of Jee and had vowed that Jee's killers would go to prison.
  - The Senate of the Philippines conducts a hearing on the kidnapping and death Jee.
  - Gen. dela Rosa said that evidence is strong against the police officers tagged in the abduction and killing of Jee.
- January 28 – Supt. Dumlao had been under restrictive custody at Camp Crame but slipped out supposedly after the police failed to serve an arrest warrant against him.
- January 29 – in a late evening press conference, Supt. Dumlao was named by President Duterte to be the mastermind in the abduction and murder and was given 24 hours to surrender.
- January 30 – NBI director Dante Gierran said no one in NBI was involved in Jee's kidnap-slay case.
- February 2 – four key NBI officials are removed from their posts as the bureau investigates the alleged involvement of its own men in the murder of Jee.
- February 3 – according to Gen. dela Rosa, unscrupulous members of the PNP and NBI could be behind the killing of Jee. In a letter, Choi Kyung-jin, has asked President Duterte to exclude the NBI from the kidnapping-murder case due to her loss of trust to carry out an impartial investigation.
- February 6 – memorial for Jee took place.
- April 18 – the DOJ has filed kidnapping and homicide charges against Supt. Dumlao III, tagging him as the principal in the killing of Jee. The DOJ panel also cleared the implicated NBI officials of any liability in Jee's kidnapping and death.
- July 19 – pre-trial hearing on the cases related to the killing of Jee.
- September 18 – South Korean Edward Yoo Hoon was arrested.

==== Calls for resignation of Gen. dela Rosa ====
- January 20
  - Senators warn the Gen. dela Rosa against allowing his men to take advantage of the war on drugs to abuse power. According to Senator Panfilo Lacson, the kidnapping and killing of Jee indicates police abuse of the government's war on drugs. Senator Francis Escudero called the murder not only embarrassing but also outright wrong and unacceptable.
  - House Speaker Pantaleon Alvarez has called for the resignation of Gen. dela Rosa to save President Duterte from further embarrassment.
  - Gen. dela Rosa said that he is to stay and will not resign unless President Duterte himself orders him to do so.
- January 21
  - Interior Secretary Ismael Sueno warned that heads will roll in PNP as a result of the death of Jee, who was killed inside Camp Crame. He also ordered Gen. dela Rosa to accelerate the investigation.
  - Both Senator Leila de Lima and Akbayan Partylist Representative Tom Villarin believe that Gen. dela Rosa was just used as a scapegoat of President Duterte in his war on drugs, which resulted to the killing of Jee.
- January 22 – President Duterte keeps Gen. dela Rosa in his post saying he still has complete trust in him.
- January 23 – Speaker Alvarez takes back his resignation calls against Gen. dela Rosa.

=== Others ===
==== January ====
- January 23 – the House of Representatives started the penalty debates on the revival of death penalty.

==== July ====
- July 24 – President Duterte delivers his second State of the Nation Address.

== National Legislation ==
=== January ===
- January 5 – President Duterte issued Proclamation No. 124, declaring the month of January of every year as National Bible Month, culminating in the last week of January as the National Bible Week.
- January 9 – President Duterte issued Executive Order (E.O.) No. 12, attaining and sustaining zero unmet need for modern family planning through the strict implementation of the Responsible Parenthood and Reproductive Health Act.
- January 31 – President Duterte issued Administrative Order No. 2, authorizing the grant of gratuity pay to job order and contract of service workers in government.

=== February ===
- February 2 – President Duterte issued Executive Order No. 13, strengthening the fight against illegal gambling and clarifying the jurisdiction and authority of concerned agencies in the regulation and licensing of gambling and online gaming facilities.
- February 14 – Secretary Medialdea issued Memorandum Circular No. 14, directing government departments, bureaus, offices, agencies, and instrumentalities to give preference to the Philippine International Convention Center as venue for their official events.
- February 21 – President Duterte issued Proclamation No. 164, declaring January 25 of every year as 'Day of National Remembrance' for the SAF 44, the forty-four uniformed personnel of the Philippine National Police Special Action Force killed in the line of duty while serving a warrant of arrest on a known terrorist in Mamasapano, Maguindanao.
- February 28
  - President Duterte issued Proclamation No. 172, declaring the 3rd week of February 2017 as 'Philippine Innovation Week'.
  - President Duterte issued Executive Order No. 14, reverting the Clark International Airport Corporation as a subsidiary of the Bases Conversion and Development Authority, and maintaining the policy supervision, and operational control of the Department of Transportation over Clark International Airport.
  - President Duterte issued Memorandum Order No. 12, approving the '2017 Investment Priorities Plan'.

=== March ===
- March 6 – President Duterte issued Executive Order No. 15, creating an Inter-Agency Committee on Anti-Illegal Drugs and Anti-Illegal Drug Task Force.

=== April ===
- April 4
  - President Duterte issued Proclamation No. 190, declaring the month of April of every year as 'National Intellectual property Month'.
  - President Duterte issued Executive Order No. 16, directing all government departments and agencies, including government-owned or -controlled corporations (GOCCs) and local government units, to adopt the 'National Security Policy 2017–2022' in the formulation and implementation of their national security related plans and programs.
- April 7
  - President Duterte issued Executive Order No. 17, creating the Order of Lapu-Lapu.
  - President Duterte issued Executive Order No. 18, repealing E.O. 235 series of 2003, streamlining the rules and procedures of defense contracts.
- April 21
  - President Duterte signs Republic Act No. 10925 into law, granting and renewing for another 25 years the franchise of GMA Network.
  - President Duterte signs Republic Act No. 10926 into law, granting and renewing for another 25 years the franchise of Smart Communications.
- April 26 – President Duterte issued Proclamation No. 200, declaring April 27 of every year as 'Lapu-Lapu Day'.
- April 27 – President Duterte issued Executive Order No. 19, reducing real property taxes and interests/penalties assessed on the power generation facilities of independent power producers under build-operate transfer contracts with GOCCs.

=== May ===
- May 16
  - President Duterte issued Executive Order No. 25, changing the name of Benham Rise to 'Philippine Rise'.
  - President Duterte issued Executive Order No. 26, establishing smoke-free environments in public and enclosed places.
- May 23 – President Duterte issued Proclamation No. 216, declaring a State of Martial Law and suspending the privilege of the writ of habeas corpus in the whole of Mindanao.
- May 30 – President Duterte issued General Order No. 1, directing the Armed Forces of the Philippines to fully implement Proclamation No. 216 dated May 23, 2017.

=== June ===
- June 1 – President Duterte issued Executive Order No. 27, directing all government agencies and instrumentalities, including local government units, to implement the 'Philippine Development Plan' and 'Public Investment Program' for the period 2017–2022.
- June 13 – President Duterte issued Proclamation No. 232, declaring June 13 to 16 as Days of National Mourning, in solidarity with the bereaved families of soldiers and police officers killed in action in the Marawi Siege.
- June 20 – President Duterte issued Executive Order No. 28 for the regulation and control of the use of firecrackers and other pyrotechnic devices.
- June 28
  - President Duterte issued Memorandum Order No. 13, abolishing Quedan and Rural Credit Guarantee Corporation.
  - President Duterte issued Executive Order No. 29, renaming the 'National Disaster Consciousness Month' to 'National Disaster Resilience Month', shifting its focus from disaster awareness building to disaster resilience.
  - President Duterte issued Administrative Order No. 3, creating an inter-agency task force for the recovery, reconstruction, and rehabilitation of the city of Marawi and other affected localities.
  - President Duterte issued Executive Order No. 30, creating the Energy Investment Coordinating Council to streamline the regulatory procedures affecting energy projects.

=== July ===
- July 12 – President Duterte issued Executive Order No. 32 to include the Department of Transportation and the Department of Information and Communications Technology as members of the National Disaster Risk Reduction and Management Council.
- July 17 – President Duterte issued Executive Order No. 33, increasing the funeral benefits of employees in both the public and private sectors.

=== August ===
- August 2
  - President Duterte signs Republic Act No. 10928 into law, extending the validity of Philippine passports for a period of 10 years.
  - President Duterte signs Republic Act No. 10929 into law, establishing a free internet access program in public places countrywide.
  - President Duterte signs Republic Act No. 10930 into law, extending the validity of Philippine drivers' licenses for a period of 5 or 10 years.
- August 3
  - President Duterte signs Republic Act No. 10931 into law. Also known as Universal Access to Quality Tertiary Education Act, the law guarantees all Filipino students to receive free higher education in state universities and colleges (SUCs), and in local universities and colleges (LUCs), exempting from paying tuition fees and other school fees.
  - President Duterte signs Republic Act No. 10932 into law, increasing the penalties for the refusal of hospitals and medical clinics to administer appropriate initial medical treatment and support in serious and emergency cases.
- August 7 – President Duterte issued Executive Order No. 38, revoking E.O. 183 s. 2015 which created the Negros Island Region (NIR), resulting to the provinces of Negros Occidental and Negros Oriental to be reverted to Western Visayas and Central Visayas regions respectively. Likewise, all NIR regional offices and regional councils created by E.O. 183 s. 2015 has been abolished.
