= Dhan Ryan Bayot =

Filipino soldier (1992–2017)

- Born: Dhan Ryan Alar Bayot; 25 July 1992; Ipil, Zamboanga Sibugay, Philippines
- Died: 24 May 2017 (aged 24); Marawi, Lanao del Sur, Philippines
- Relatives: Larry Bayot (father)
- Military career
- Allegiance: Philippines
- Branch: Philippine Army
- Service years: unknown–2017
- Rank: Private First Class
- Unit: 51st Infantry Battalion
- Conflicts: Battle of Marawi †
- Awards: Order of Lapu-Lapu

Dhan Ryan Alar Bayot (July 25, 1992 – May 24, 2017) was a Filipino soldier who served as a Private First Class in the Philippine Army's 51st Infantry Battalion. He was killed in action during the opening days of the siege of Marawi in 2017.

Bayot became a national symbol of military heroism for his last stand against a superior force of Maute Group terrorists.

== Early life and career ==
Dhan Ryan Alar Bayot was born on July 25, 1992, and hailed from Ipil, Zamboanga Sibugay. He was the son of Sergeant Larry Bayot of the Philippine Army's 1st Infantry Battalion.

Bayot served in the Philippine Army and held the rank of Private First Class. He was assigned to the 51st Infantry Battalion (51IB), which is part of the 1st Infantry Division.

== Siege of Marawi ==
Bayot's unit was among the earliest responders when the siege of Marawi erupted in May 2017. He was stationed at a detachment of the 51st Infantry Battalion in Barangay Lilod, Marawi. His team, which was composed of ten soldiers, was tasked to provide security near the home of a local government official against the Maute Group and its allies.

On May 24, 2017, the second day of the siege, Bayot and his team were attacked by terrorists who had taken over the official's house. Different accounts state that Bayot was with five or nine companions when they were ambushed. In the ensuing firefight, Bayot became the sole survivor from his team and found himself completely surrounded by enemy forces. Unable to receive ground reinforcement because all pathways were blocked, Bayot contacted his commanding officer and requested for a military bombardment of his location to neutralize the large number of terrorists in the area, even if it meant his own death. One report indicates the artillery strike was carried out, successfully killing the surrounding Maute terrorists. Bayot's corpse and those of the nine other soldiers were retrieved five days after the incident. It was concluded that Bayot did not die from the military bombing since his body was found to be mutilated and his throat slit open.

Bayot's heroic request was reported to have not been executed by the military, which instead sent troops for a recovery operation. His remains, along with those of his nine comrades, were retrieved four to five days later, on May 28, 2017. His father, Sergeant Larry Bayot, was reportedly part of the recovery team. Military reports indicated that Bayot did not die from a military bombing but was found mutilated, with his throat slit, suggesting he was tortured or executed by the terrorists.

== Legacy ==
For his act of "selflessness and courage", Bayot was posthumously awarded the Order of Lapu-Lapu, an honor given for "invaluable or extraordinary service" in the line of duty. Bayot's ultimate act of self-sacrifice deeply moved the Filipino public, transforming his story into a widely shared symbol of courage and dedication for the entire nation during the intensity of the Marawi conflict. His father, Sergeant Larry Bayot, told The Manila Times that while it was "painful" to lose his son, he took comfort in the fact that what his son did was "heroic".

== See also ==
- Rommel Sandoval
- Gener Tinangag
