= Amin Bacu =

ISIS Southeast Asia leader

Personal details
- Born: 1983 Tawau, Sabah, Malaysia
- Died: 20 October 2017 (aged 33–34) Marawi, Lanao del Sur, Philippines
- Occupation: Islamic terrorist

Military service
- Allegiance: Maute group
- Battles/wars: Mamasapano massacre; Siege of Marawi

Amin Bacu or Amin Baco (1983 – 20 October 2017) was the ISIS Southeast Asia leader who replaced Isnilon Hapilon after he was killed and an expert bomb maker. He also took part on the Mamasapano massacre with Marwan and bombed Basilan and Sulu.

Hatib Sawadjaan, his father in law, was head of Tanum Group, a faction of Abu Sayyaf, and he established close links with Islamic militants in Sabah, Sulawesi and Mindanao. He was married on Jolo island with a member of Abu Sayyaf family.

In November 2002 he masterminded the kidnapping of two Malaysians and was involved in terrorist trafficking and firearms between South Philippines and Indonesia. Since 2006 he has operated in Mindanao and coordinated military attacks with ASG, and he was one of the masterminds and key fund raiser of the siege of Marawi.

It was believed he was killed with some 40 other militants in the final assault of the battle of Marawi by the government troops, being part of the last remaining fighters alongside Ibno Kayin, but Col. Romeo Brawner believes that he may still be alive. Muhammad Ilham Syahputra, an Indonesian terrorist who was detained on 1 November 2017, said he fled from Marawi City.
