= Mahmud Ahmad =

Malaysian Islamist and professor of Islamic law (1978–2017)

Mahmud bin Ahmad
- Born: 25 September 1978; Batu Caves, Gombak District, Selangor, Malaysia
- Died: 18 October 2017 (aged 39); Marawi City, Lanao del Sur, Philippines

Mahmud bin Ahmad, known as Abu Handzalah (25 September 1978 – 7 June 2017), was a Malaysian professor of Islamic law and a senior Islamic militant with Abu Sayyaf in the Philippines.

== History ==
He was born in Batu Caves, Gombak District, Selangor.

In the 1990s he travelled to Pakistan to study, where he obtained two bachelor's degrees from the International Islamic University, Islamabad. In the late 1990s he is said to have attended an Al-Qaeda training camp in Afghanistan. He has a master's degree from the International Islamic University Malaysia and a doctoral degree from the University of Malaya. At the University of Malaya he was a senior lecturer in the Department of Aqidah and Islamic Thought in the Academy of Islamic Studies.

According to fellow teachers at the University of Malaya, in late 2013 he began openly expressing his views about jihad. He wrote a journal titled "Faith of the Mujahidin" and founded a religious school called Open Tahfiz Centre.

In March 2014, he arranged for at least four Malaysians to travel to Syria to join the Islamic State of Iraq and the Levant.

He has been on the Malaysian most wanted list since he travelled to the Philippines in July 2014.

According to the head of the Philippine Armed Forces, General Eduardo Año, he was killed on 7 June 2017 along with 13 militants during the Battle of Marawi in the Philippines. It was alleged Mahmud funnelled over 30 million pesos from the Islamic State to gain firearms, food and other supplies to finance the militants' siege on Marawi. Malaysian police chief Khalid Abu Bakar said he believed Mahmud is still alive.
