= 1st Scout Ranger Regiment =

Philippine Army unit specializing in jungle warfare and anti-guerrilla operations

First Scout Ranger Regiment (FSRR)
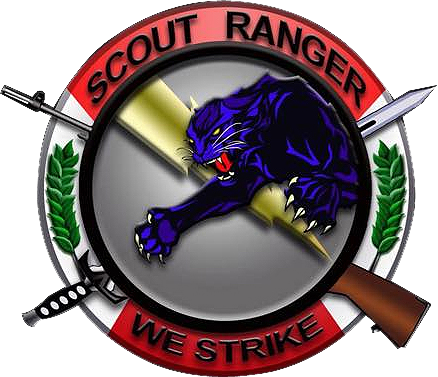
- Dress Uniform Pin Badge of the Scout Rangers
- Active: November 25, 1950 – present
- Country: Philippines
- Branch: Philippine Army
- Type: Special Operation Forces
- Role: Anti-guerrilla warfare Jungle warfare Unconventional warfare Direct action Reconnaissance; Special reconnaissance Special operations
- Size: 5 Battalions
- Part of: Special Operations Command (Philippine Army)
- Garrison/HQ: Fort Bonifacio, Taguig City; Camp Tecson, San Miguel, Bulacan (Main)
- Nicknames: Musangs (civet cats); FSRR; Strikers; Rangers; SR; Scout Rangers
- Motto: We Strike
- Colors: Red
- March: "We Strike" (Scout Ranger Song)
- Mascot: Black Panther
- Anniversaries: November 25
- Engagements: Hukbalahap Rebellion; Communist rebellion; Islamic insurgencies; Moro conflict; New People's Army rebellion; Operation Enduring Freedom - Philippines; 2013 Zamboanga Siege; 2017 Marawi Crisis
- Decorations: Philippine Republic Presidential Unit Citation Badge; Presidential Streamer Award

Commanders
- Current commander: BGen. Montano Almodovar PA
- Notable commanders: LtGen Rafael Ileto AFP; Gen Felix Brawner II AFP; BGen Marcelo Blando AFP; BGen Julius Javier AFP; BGen Danilo Lim AFP; BGen Reynaldo Mapagu AFP

Insignia
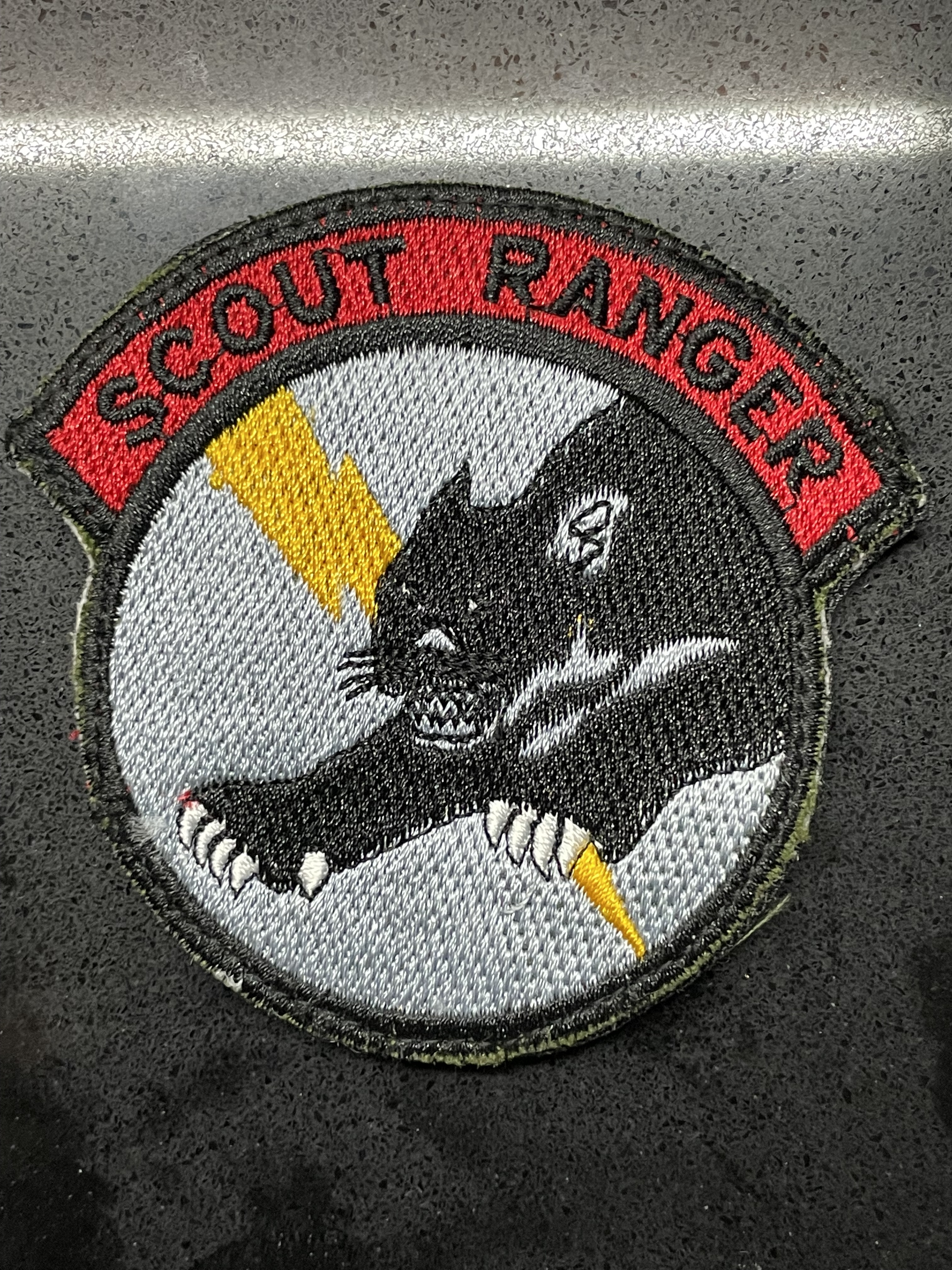
- Shoulder Sleeve Insignia

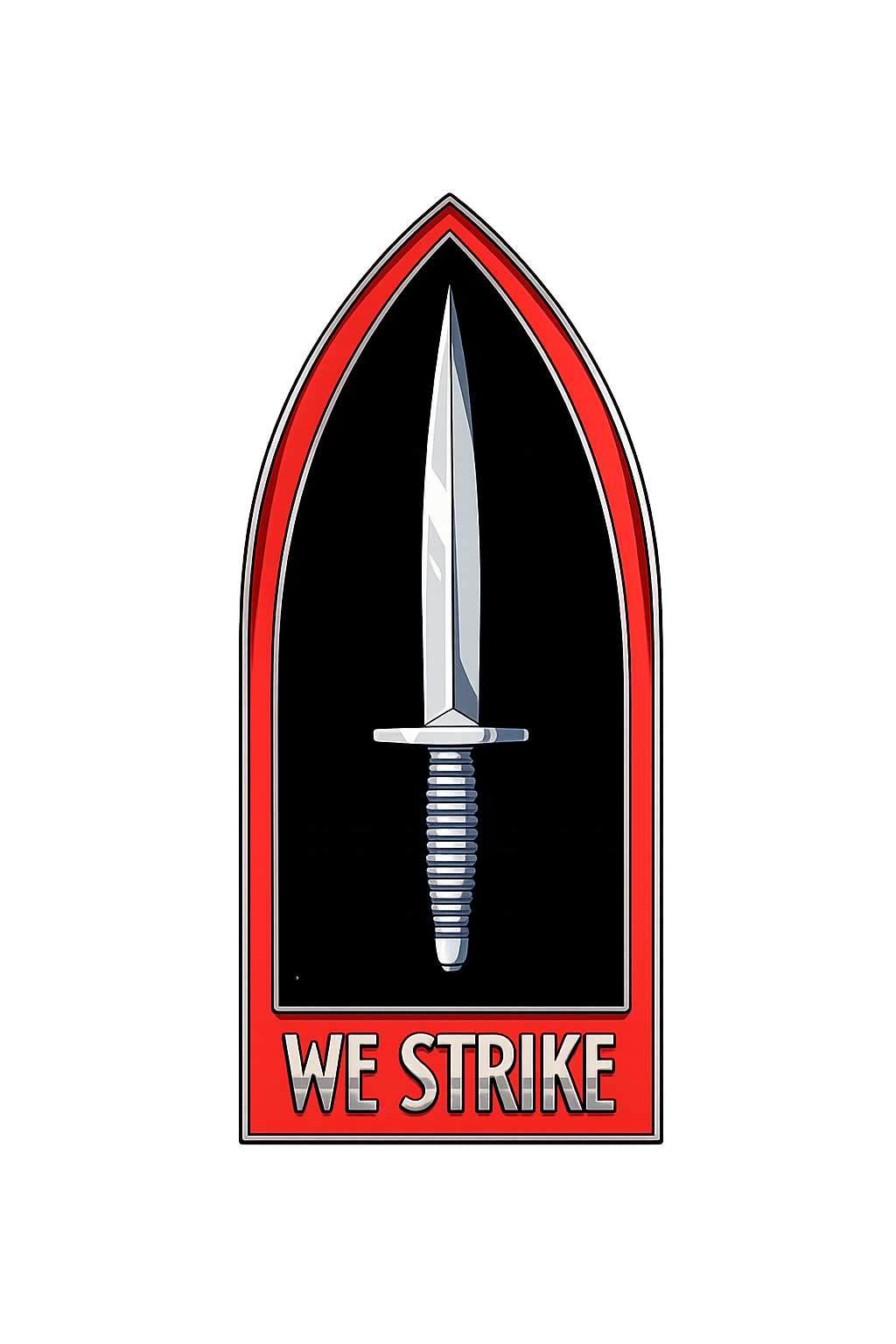
- Scout Ranger Qualification Badge (Tabak Badge)

The First Scout Ranger Regiment (FSRR), or more commonly known as the Scout Rangers (SR), is a special operations forces component of the Philippine Army (PA) that specializes in conducting anti-guerilla jungle warfare, counterterrorism, and hostage rescue operations.

== History ==
The FSRR was formed on November 25, 1950, under the command of former Vice Chief of Staff of the Armed Forces of the Philippines and Secretary of National Defense Rafael M. Ileto. The unit was modelled after the Alamo Scouts (of the US 6th Army) and the US Army Rangers, two units that the then-First Lieutenant Ileto (nicknamed Rocky) had served with during the Second World War.

The FSSR was created due to a growing need to counter the Hukbalahap guerrillas with a force trained in small unit actions. The first operators to be called Scout Rangers were volunteers from the various Battalion Combat Teams (BCTs) throughout the entire Army establishment, as well as personnel from the Philippine Constabulary (who later formed their own special operations group, the PC Ranger Company, the predecessor of the Special Action Force of the Philippine National Police). The first batch of Scout Rangers to complete their specialized training consisted of nine officers, and 61 enlisted personnel.

Initially known as the Scout Ranger Training Unit (SRTU), they were made up of 5-man teams, made up of one officer and 4 enlisted men, trained for guerilla warfare deep into enemy territory. SRTU teams used deep penetration tactics to infiltrate Huk-held territory and take out their units.

Upon successful neutralization of the Huks, the SRTU was deactivated in 1957, only to be put back in action on December 8, 1971, to combat a new threat: the rebels under the Communist Party of the Philippines-New People's Army-National Democratic Front (CPP-NPA-NDF).

Growing in size, the SRTU was reorganized on July 16, 1978, as the Scout Ranger Group (SRG), under the newly created Army Special Warfare Brigade (ASWABde). At this point, the ASRG had five companies at its disposal.

In March 1983, the ASWABde was deactivated, but the Scout Rangers lived on, now taking the name of the 1st Scout Ranger Regiment (FSRR), which they still take to this day.

Due to its reputation in fighting rebels throughout the entire country, the AFP designated FSRR as a "national maneuver force" on December 1, 1986. This meant that they can be deployed anywhere in the country as the AFP sees them fit, unlike the various Army divisions which are concentrated in a certain area of operations (AOR).

The Scout Rangers participated in the December 1989 coup attempt against the administration of Corazon Aquino. Led by then Captain Danilo Lim, Major Abraham Purugganan and Lieutenant Colonel Rafael Galvez, some 2500 Rangers took over Makati in the most destructive coup attempt against the Aquino administration which left hundreds of civilians and soldiers dead, and hundreds more injured. In effect, FSRR was disbanded after this, only to be reactivated two years later.

The Scout Rangers played a major role in capturing the Moro Islamic Liberation Front (MILF) rebel camp during the 2000 all-out war against the MILF, receiving the Presidential Streamer Award in the process.

During the Battle of Marawi of 2017, Scout Rangers were the first elite units deployed with the 1st Infantry Division to neutralize the Islamic State-inspired Maute Group, and the fundamentalist terrorist group Abu Sayyaf, and their leader Isnilon Hapilon. During the battle, the Scout Rangers incurred many casualties including a veteran Captain of the battle of Zamboanga city. A Scout Ranger is credited with killing Hapilon during the final stages of battle.

On July 20, 2022, Private Amaleth Joyce Caoyong was the first female soldier to pass Scout Ranger training.

In July 2025, the Scout Rangers joined the Salaknib 2025 exercises with American soldiers. In August 2025, a reserve component in the Scout Rangers was activated.

== Unit Organization ==
FSRR is composed of approximately 2,500 personnel (as of August 2019), and is organized as follows:

=== Battalions ===
- 1st Scout Ranger Battalion ("Unbeatable")
- 2nd Scout Ranger Battalion ("Second to None")
- 3rd Scout Ranger Battalion ("Excelsior")
- 4th Scout Ranger Battalion ("Masigasig"; "Enthusiastic" in Filipino)
- 5th Scout Ranger Battalion ("Valientes"; "Valiant" in Spanish)
- Scout Ranger School (SRS) (Formerly the Scout Ranger Training Center)

=== Companies ===
- 1st Scout Ranger Company ‘Reconnaissance’
- 2nd Scout Ranger Company ‘Venceremos’ (‘We will win’, in Spanish)
- 3rd Scout Ranger Company ‘Terminator’
- 4th Scout Ranger Company ‘Final Option’
- 5th Scout Ranger Company ‘Salaknib’ (‘Shield’, in Ilocano)
- 6th Scout Ranger Company ‘The Cutting Edge’
- 7th Scout Ranger Company ‘In Hoc Signo Vinces’ (‘Under this sign thou shalt conquer’, in Latin)
- 8th Scout Ranger Company ‘Destruere Hostis Deus’ (‘Destroy the enemy of God’, in Latin)
- 9th Scout Ranger Company ‘Angát sa Ibá!’ (‘Above all others!’, in Filipino)
- 10th Scout Ranger Company ‘Ultimus Fortis’ ('We Lead', in Latin)
- 11th Scout Ranger Company ‘Pericoloso’ (‘Dangerous’, in Italian)
- 12th Scout Ranger Company ‘Always Ready’
- 13th Scout Ranger Company ‘Warrior’
- 14th Scout Ranger Company ‘Mabalasik’ (‘Fierce’, in Filipino)
- 15th Scout Ranger Company ‘Mandirigmâ’ (‘Fighters’ or ‘Warriors’, in Filipino)
- 16th Scout Ranger Company ‘Mabangís’ (‘Vicious’, in Filipino)
- 17th Scout Ranger Company ‘Mapanganib’ (‘Dangerous’, in Filipino)
- 18th Scout Ranger Company ‘Makamandág’ (‘Venomous’, in Filipino)
- 19th Scout Ranger Company ‘Dimalupig’ (‘Unbeatable’, in Filipino)
- 20th Scout Ranger Company ‘Hellcat’
- 21st Scout Ranger Company ‘Mapangahas’ (‘Fearless’, in Filipino)
- 22nd Scout Ranger Company ‘Colpire Duro’ (‘Strike Hard’, in Italian)

== Training ==
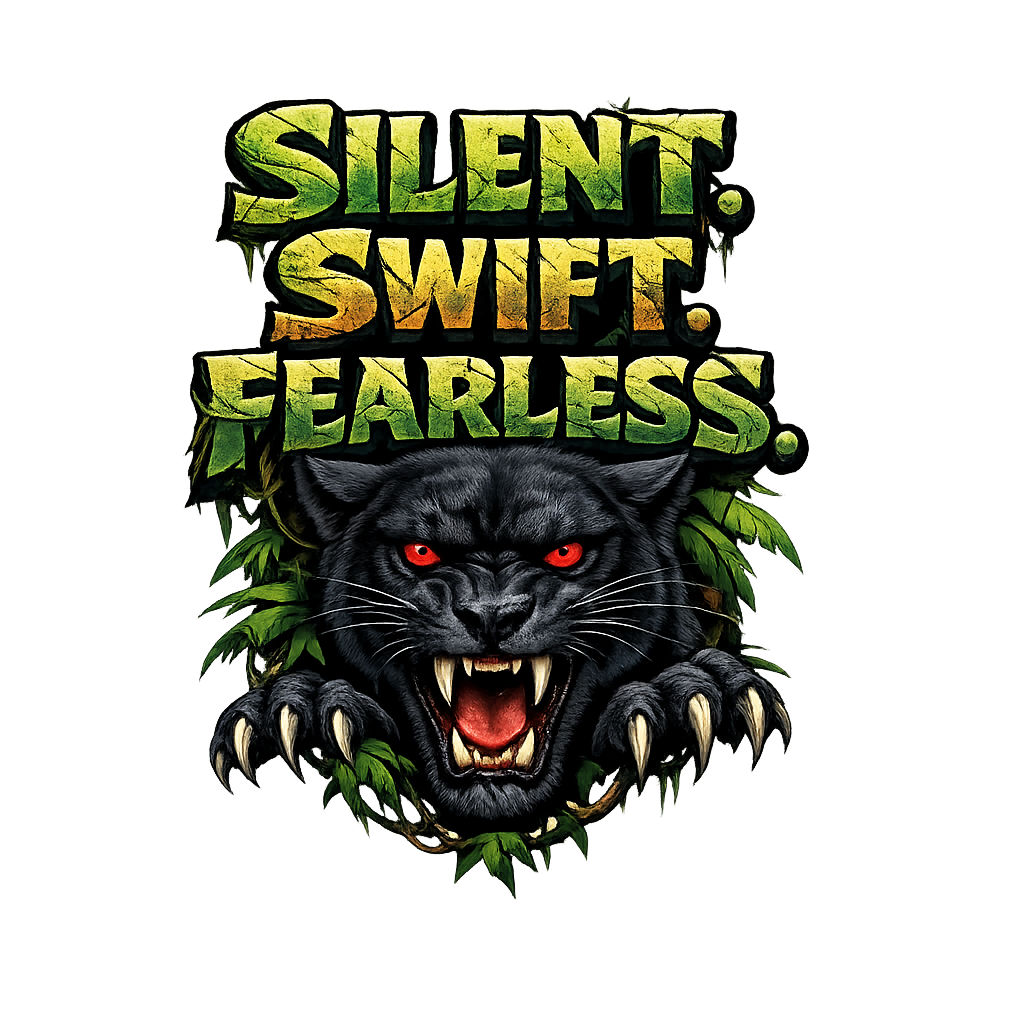
Excerpt from "Oath of a Ranger" Scout Ranger Battlecry: Silent. Swift. Fearless.

Scout Ranger training has been deemed to be one of the hardest throughout the Armed Forces of the Philippines. Among the various training courses FSRR operators undergo, the core of it all is called the Scout Ranger Course (SRC) for six months.

The SRC is a 32-week course (around 10 months) , divided into four (4) phases, namely:

- Phase 1: Individual Training Phase
- Phase 2: Small Unit Training
- Phase 3: Combat Maneuvers (Field Training Exercises)
- Phase 4: Test Mission
  - The SRC has made the unique distinction that a graduating class must undergo an actual combat mission, known within SR circles as a "test mission", designated by the regiment commanders.

Their training regimen throughout the SRC include (but not limited to):

- physical fitness training (PFT), focusing on:
  - muscle endurance,
  - strength, and
  - cardiovascular toughness
- mental and psychological exercises
- team dynamics in high-pressure situations
- morning runs from 5km (3.1mi) to 21km (13mi), all while carrying 20kn (44lbs) of individual equipment, including their service rifles
- sleep deprivation (one training week is dedicated for this)

SRC graduates are awarded with the Scout Ranger Qualification Badge, known within the regiment as the "Tabak" badge (named after a pre-colonial Filipino fighting blade), pinned on the breast pockets of their dress uniforms, or stitched as an embroidered patch on their Battle Dress Uniforms (Army, and Air Force), or their Field Service Uniforms (PNP).

Despite being organized and facilitated by the Philippine Army, the SRC is also open to personnel from the Philippine National Police and from other AFP units.

Other training courses offered, and undertaken by the Scout Rangers include (but not limited to):

- Scout Ranger Orientation Training (SROT)
- Scout Ranger Orientation Course (SROC)
- Scout Sniper Course (SSC)
- Combat Tracking Course (CTC)
- Pekiti Tirsia Kali Course (PTKC)
- Rappel Master Course (RMC)
- Physical Trainer's Training Course (PTTC)
- Rope Master Trainers' Training

=== International ===
Scout Rangers are sent to train in Cobra Gold annual exercises with American and foreign troops.

== Equipment ==
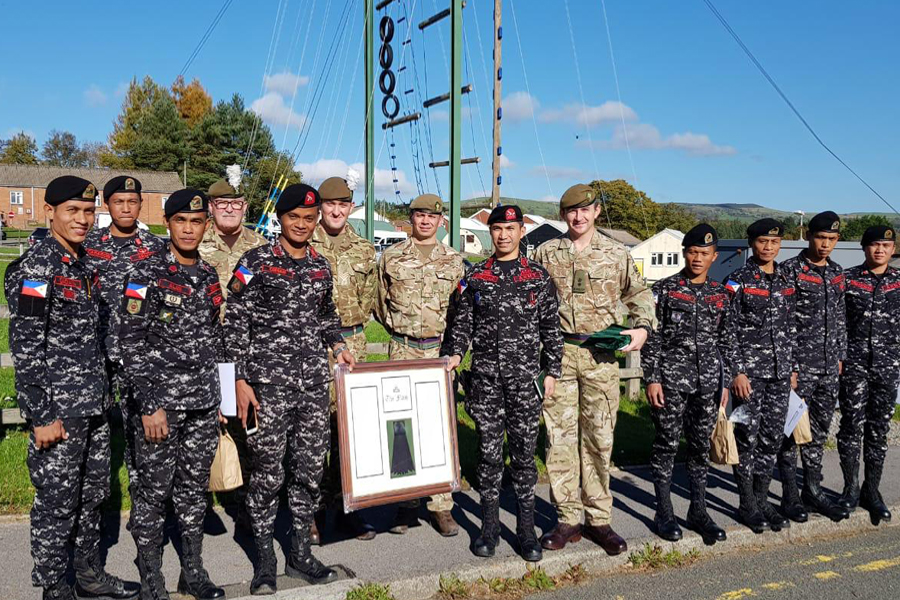
Scout Rangers in a photo taken during Exercise Cambrian Patrol (EX CP) 2018, in Wales, UK. The FSSR operators are wearing the Scout Ranger Distinctive Uniform (SRDU).

The Scout Rangers, since its inception, has fought their battles wearing solid black military uniforms (sometimes tailored in the cut of the US Battle Dress Uniform). They also wear their black berets. This is said to pay homage to their mascot, the civet cat (Musang), and to their reputation to strike quickly in their operations, hence their motto of "We Strike". All their uniform insignias are embroidered and stitched in red.

But as paramilitary groups, security guards, police forces (such as the PNP SWAT teams), and even the Communist rebels also started to adopt black military uniforms, FSSR has adopted the Scout Ranger Distinctive Uniform (SRDU) in around 2009-2010, for the sole intention to help operators identify their comrades in battle. Later on, the SRDU was reserved only for drill and parade purposes. The SRDU uses a pixelated camouflage pattern akin to the US Army's Universal Camouflage Pattern (UCP), albeit using a black-grey-white color scheme.

In the present time, Scout Rangers prefer to fight their battles using surplus US Woodland BDUs, the vintage DPM-derived AFP Battle Dress Attire (BDA), and the currently issued Philippine Army Pattern (PHILARPAT) BDUs.

== Collaboration with foreign SOFs ==
During the Cold War, the FSRR provided training for prospective commandos of the Royal Laotian Army. They have also trained constantly with US special forces and the Australian SASR.

In November 2021, the Scout Rangers have conducted joint training with Kopassus operators.

In 2024 and 2025, the FSRR participated in exercises alongside the SFR(A) with Cambodian special forces units.
