= Rommel Sandoval =

Philippine Army officer (1979–2017)

Rommel B. Sandoval
- Born: July 26, 1979; Bauan, Batangas, Philippines
- Died: September 10, 2017 (aged 38); Marawi, Lanao del Sur, Philippines
- Military career
- Allegiance: Philippines
- Branch: Philippine Army: Special Operations Command
- Service years: 2005–2017
- Rank: Captain
- Nickname: Daredevil
- Unit: 1st Scout Ranger Regiment
- Commands: 11th Scout Ranger Company
- Conflicts: Battle of Marawi †
- Awards: Medal of Valor

Rommel Bigyan Sandoval (July 26, 1979 – September 10, 2017) was a Philippine Army officer commissioned as captain and a recipient of the Philippines' highest military award for courage, the Medal of Valor. Sandoval was the Commanding officer of the 11th Scout Ranger Company, 4th Scout Ranger Battalion of the 1st Scout Ranger Regiment deployed to fight ISIS-inspired militants during the 2017 Battle of Marawi. He graduated at Philippine Military Academy located in Baguio.

On September 10, 2017, the 111th day of the battle, Sandoval was killed in action attempting to rescue one of his men wounded in a firefight with the jihadist militants. Sandoval, a Captain, was the highest-ranking soldier to have died in the Battle of Marawi.

== Early life and education ==
Sandoval was a graduate of Bauan High School (now Bauan College) class of 1996, and he was also a graduate of the Philippine Military Academy's Class of 2005.

== Marawi siege ==
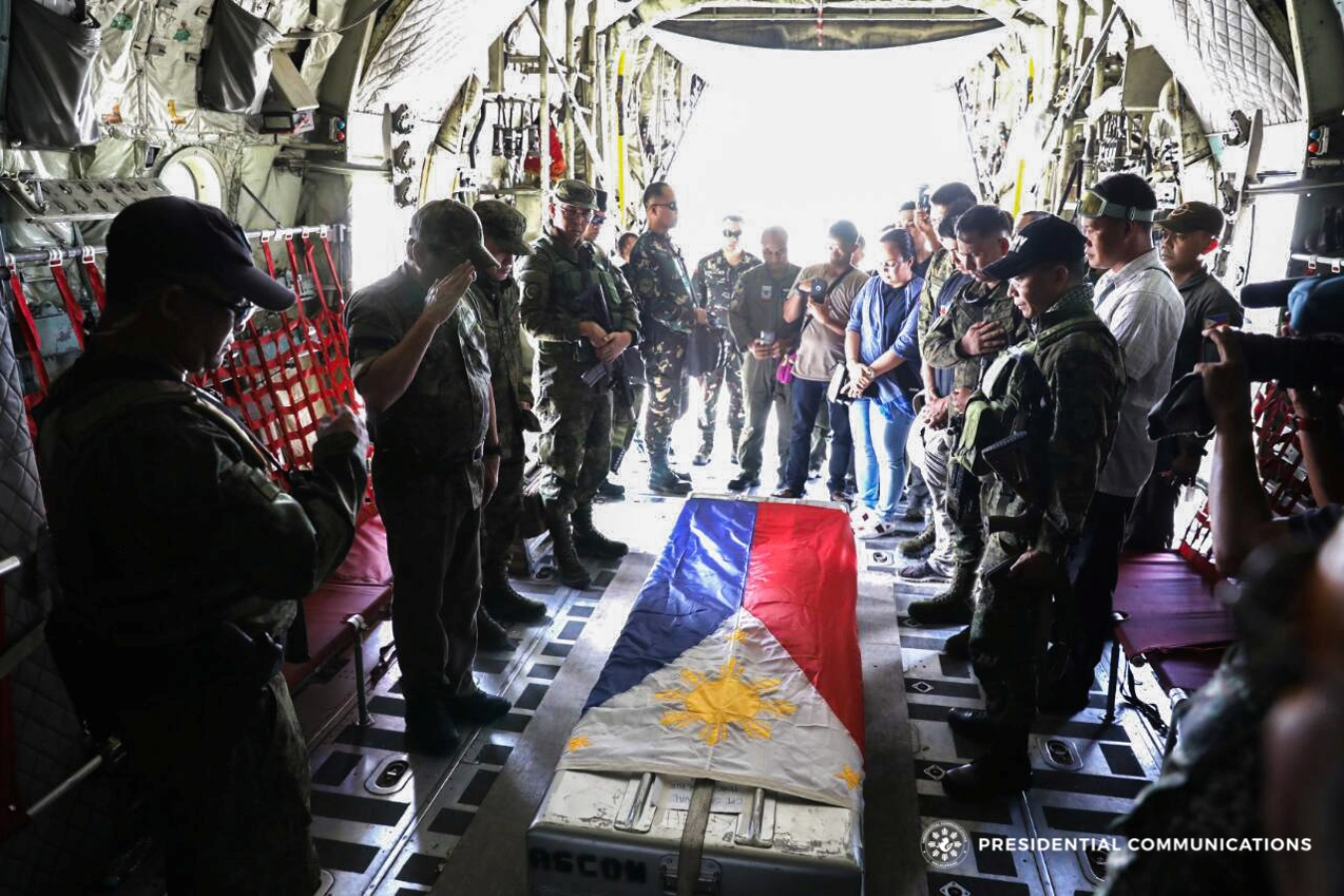
President Rodrigo Duterte pays his last respects to Captain Rommel Sandoval, September 11, 2017.

Sandoval had spent over three months in the siege of Marawi without losing a single one of his men. His command, the 11th Scout Ranger Company, had not had a single casualty since their deployment. In August 2017, he had saved a group of Scout Rangers who had been trapped in a building in the main battle area. Under his instructions, they had exfiltrated the building using an armored personnel carrier and escaped the Maute group.

=== Death ===
External videos
- Philippine Scout Ranger - Ranger Sandoval Tribute, YouTube video

External videos
- Marawi hero: The courage of Captain Rommel Sandoval, YouTube video

On September 10, 2017, Sandoval's company was tasked with retaking a stronghold of the Islamic militants. The building, a 5-storey commercial complex called C&D Centerpoint, was occupied by a branch of the Land Bank of the Philippines prior to the siege. It was referred to by the Philippine military as part of the militants' final defensive position and was defended by more than 26 militants.

Sandoval's men began clearing the building from top to bottom. After clearing the fifth to the second storeys, they were about to enter the ground level when a burst of gunfire wounded Corporal Jayson Mante. His two other companions managed to quickly withdraw to the safety of the building's second storey, but Mante's injury prevented his own escape. Several failed attempts to rescue Mante transpired, during which time he was wounded several more times. At this point, Sandoval himself found an alternate route by which to approach and rescue Mante. He ordered his men to provide suppressive fire while he and another soldier, Private First Class Sherwin Canapi, attempted the rescue. As he reached the wounded soldier, Sandoval checked the latter's pulse and tried to pull him to safety. Sandoval was first wounded in his side. He returned fire but was then shot in the cheek, which proved fatal. He managed to crawl on top of Mante, shielding him from enemy fire. His body was later found to have bullets lodged in the chest, proving that he had protected Mante from getting further hit. Canapi was also killed in the rescue attempt.

Captain Sandoval was buried at the Libingan ng mga Bayani on September 15, 2017. He was conferred the Armed Forces of the Philippines Medal of Valor, the highest award conferred to members of the AFP, on December 20, 2017.

== Personal life ==
Sandoval was married to Maria Ana Rosario "Ani" Ello Sandoval. He was said to have been a talented artist; an illustrator, painter and wood carver who also had a passion for bonsai.

== In popular culture ==
Actor Zanjoe Marudo played the role of Sandoval and also his wife, Ani was played by actress Kim Chiu in the anthology series Maalaala Mo Kaya episode "Tangke" last March 10, 2018 dedicated for the story about Marawi Siege.

== See also ==
- Arturo B. Ortiz
- Noel S. Buan
