= Siege of Marawi =

2017 conflict between the Philippine government and the Maute Group

- Part of the Islamic State insurgency in the Philippines during the Moro conflict, Operation Enduring Freedom – Philippines and the war against the Islamic State
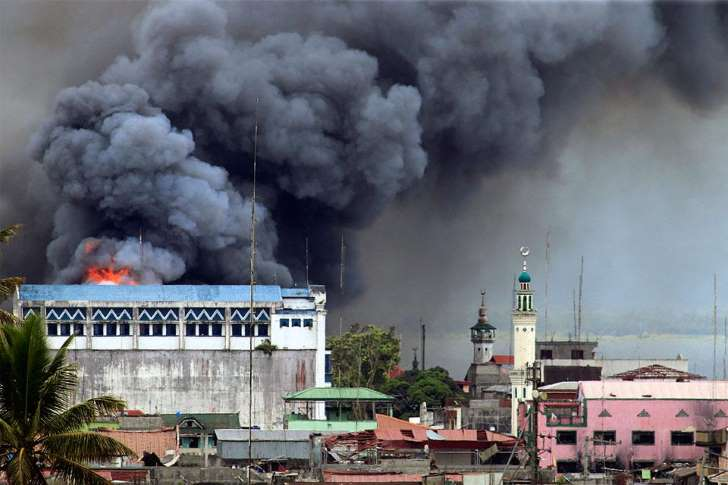
- A building in Marawi is set ablaze by airstrikes carried out by the Philippine Air Force and the Naval Air Wing of the Philippine Navy
Date	May 23 – October 23, 2017 (5 months)
Location	Marawi, Lanao del Sur, Philippines 8.00°N 124.29°E
Result	Philippine government victory
Territorial changes	Marawi recaptured by the Armed Forces of the Philippines on October 23, 2017

Belligerents
Philippines	Islamic State

Commanders and leaders
(Philippines) Lt. Gen. Rolando Bautista (2nd Commanding General of the Philippine Army, 1st Overall Ground Commander, Joint Task Force Marawi, and the 1st Infantry Division) (Philippines) Lt. Gen. Danilo G. Pamonag (2nd Overall Ground Commander, Joint Task Force Marawi) (Philippines) V. Adm. Ronald Joseph Mercado (Flag Officer-in-Command of the Philippine Navy)	(Islamic State) Isnilon Hapilon † (Abu Sayyaf commander and regional Emir) (Islamic State) Abdullah Maute † (Maute Group commander) (Islamic State) Omar Maute † (Maute Group deputy commander) (Islamic State) Mahmud Ahmad † (Abu Sayyaf deputy commander) (Islamic State) Amin Bacu † (Abu Sayyaf senior commander)

Units involved
Joint Task Force Marawi; Armed Forces of the Philippines; AFP Western Mindanao Command; AFP Joint Special Operations Group; AFP Reserve Command; Philippine Army; 1st Scout Ranger Regiment; Armor "Pambato" Division; 1st Infantry Division; 2nd Infantry Division; Army Reserve Command; Philippine Navy; Naval Forces Western Mindanao; Philippine Fleet; Naval Special Operations Command; Naval Air Wing; Philippine Marine Corps; 1st Marine Brigade; 7th Marine Landing Battalion; Assault Armor Battalion; Force Reconnaissance Battalion; Philippine Air Force; 15th Strike Wing; 5th Fighter Wing; 710th Special Operations Wing; Philippine National Police; Special Action Force; PNP Maritime Group; Philippine Coast Guard; Coast Guard Special Operations Force; Coast Guard K9 Force; Coast Guard District Northern Mindanao; Coast Guard District Southeastern Mindanao; Coast Guard District Southwestern Mindanao	Abu Sayyaf; Maute group Bangsamoro Islamic Freedom Fighters (Note: There have been conflicting reports in regard to the presence of the Bangsamoro Islamic Freedom Fighters (BIFF) during the Battle of Marawi. The Philippines' Secretary of National Defense Delfin Lorenzana stated in June 2017 that about 40 BIFF fighters were among the Jihadist forces inside the city. According to other reports, the group had not only contributed fighters to the battle, but also provided "logistical support" to the ISIL troops in Marawi. A BIFF spokesman stated during the battle that his group "welcomed" the offensive by the Maute group and Abu Sayyaf, but did not confirm that BIFF had troops in Marawi. Instead, the spokesman claimed that the BIFF attacks which coincided with the siege had nothing to do with the Maute group and Abu Sayyaf. Furthermore, the leader of the Moro Islamic Liberation Front Murad Ebrahim claimed in July 2018 that BIFF had not participated in the battle.); Ansar Khalifa Philippines; Islamic State - Philippines Province

Strength
3,000+ soldiers (in June); 6,500 soldiers (by September)	1,000 militants

Casualties and losses
1,568+ total casualties 168 killed 1,400+ wounded	974 total casualties 962 killed (Philippine Army claim); 12 captured
- 87 civilians dead (40 due to illness); 300 civilians missing Nearly 1.1 million civilians displaced
- The location of Marawi in Mindanao

The siege of Marawi (Filipino: Pagkubkob sa Marawi), also known as the Marawi crisis (Krisis sa Marawi) and the Battle of Marawi (Labanan sa Marawi), was a five-month-long armed conflict in Marawi, Philippines, that started on May 23, 2017, between Philippine government security forces against militants affiliated with the Islamic State (IS), including the Maute and Abu Sayyaf Salafi jihadist groups. The battle also became the longest urban battle in the modern history of the Philippines.

According to the Philippine government, the clashes began during an offensive in Marawi to capture Isnilon Hapilon, the leader of the Islamic State's affiliate Abu Sayyaf group, after receiving reports that Hapilon was in the city, possibly to meet with militants of the Maute group. A deadly firefight erupted when Hapilon's forces opened fire on the combined army and police teams and called for reinforcements from the Maute group, an armed group that pledged allegiance to the Islamic State and which is believed to be responsible for the 2016 Davao City bombing, according to military spokesmen.

Maute group militants attacked Camp Ranao and occupied several buildings in the city, including Marawi City Hall, Mindanao State University, a hospital and the city jail. They also occupied the main street and set fire to Saint Mary's Cathedral, Ninoy Aquino School and Dansalan College, run by the United Church of Christ in the Philippines (UCCP). The militants also took a priest and several churchgoers hostage.

The Armed Forces of the Philippines stated that some of the terrorists were immigrants in the Philippines who had been in the country for a long time, offering support to the Maute group in Marawi. Their main objective was to raise the jihadist flag of the ISIL at the Lanao del Sur Provincial Capitol and declare a wilayat or provincial IS territory in Lanao del Sur.

On October 17, 2017, the day after the deaths of militant leaders Omar Maute and Isnilon Hapilon, Philippine president Duterte declared that Marawi was "liberated from terrorist influence". On October 23, Delfin Lorenzana, the Philippine Defense Secretary announced that the five-month battle against the terrorists in Marawi had ended.

== Background ==
The Battle of Marawi was a consequence of the Philippines' long struggle against terrorism, in the aftermath of the September 11 attacks in the United States, against the Abu Sayyaf Group (ASG) then linked with al-Qaeda and now with the Islamic State. But the Battle of Marawi has been associated with the Maute group being its stronghold. The Maute Group had established a stronghold in Lanao del Sur since February 2016 and was blamed for the 2016 Davao City bombing and two attacks in Butig, Lanao del Sur, a town located south of Marawi, in 2016. Since the militant group's founding in 2013, the Philippine government has downplayed the threat of IS in the Philippines. Following the February 2016 Butig clash with the Maute Group, then-President Benigno Aquino III discounted the possibility of the Islamic State's presence in the country. He said that those behind the attack were just mercenaries wanting to be recognized by the Middle East-based terror group.

The Abu Sayyaf group, blamed for deadly bombings and kidnappings in the past, had also pledged allegiance to the IS in the summer of 2014. One of its leaders, Isnilon Hapilon, was listed as among the world's most wanted terrorists by the US State Department with a reward of up to US$5 million for his capture. Following the abduction and subsequent beheading of Canadian businessman John Ridsdel in April 2016, Aquino disclosed that he had received death threats from the jihadist group, and that the Abu Sayyaf also plotted to kidnap his sister Kris, and Manny Pacquiao. Aquino also identified Hapilon behind attempts to convert and recruit inmates at the New Bilibid Prison to their cause, and embark on a bombing campaign in Metro Manila, which he said was "part of their effort to gain favor with ISIS."

In November 2016, President Rodrigo Duterte confirmed the Maute Group's affiliation with IS and he even revealed that the Siege of Marawi was also related to narcoterrorism. But the Philippine military maintained that IS had not established links with militants in the Philippines. Amidst fierce fighting in Butig on November 30, 2016, Duterte, in a command briefing in Lanao del Sur, warned the Maute group: "I do not want a fight with you. I don't want us killing each other but please, do not force my hand. I cannot be forever traveling here every month just to talk, and when I turn around, there's killing again. I do not want to mention anything, but please do not force my hand into it."

On December 2, 2016, as the military regained control of Butig, the retreating Maute fighters reportedly left a note threatening to behead Duterte and the military. On December 12, 2016, in a speech before the Wallace Business Forum Dinner, Duterte dared the Maute Group to attack Marawi, stating: "Because they (the Maute Group) threatened to go down from the mountains to burn down Marawi? Go ahead, be my guest. We will wait for you there. No problem."

From April to May 2017, Abu Sayyaf fought in clashes with Philippine security forces in Bohol which resulted in the deaths of three soldiers, a policeman while ten militants were eliminated.

=== Prelude to the battle ===
The Armed Forces of the Philippines (AFP) stated that the fighting in Marawi was due to a raid conducted by the military in coordination with the Philippine National Police, contrary to earlier reports that the clash was initiated by the militant groups. Rolando Joselito Bautista, commanding general of the Philippine Army's 1st Infantry Division, stated that they had received reports of impending activity two or three weeks ahead of time. As the combined military and local police team conducted zoning in Marawi to validate the information that suspicious personalities including Omar Maute and Abdullah Maute were consolidating in the area, their team instead spotted Isnilon Hapilon. According to the AFP, Hapilon had been appointed as "emir" of the IS forces in the Philippines and was consolidating his group with the Maute and other terrorist groups. After residents of Marawi reported the presence of an armed group within their locale and after the AFP verified the information, the AFP launched a "surgical operation" in order to capture Hapilon, only to stumble into an entire city of armed men.

== Timeline (2017) ==
=== May ===
==== May 23 ====
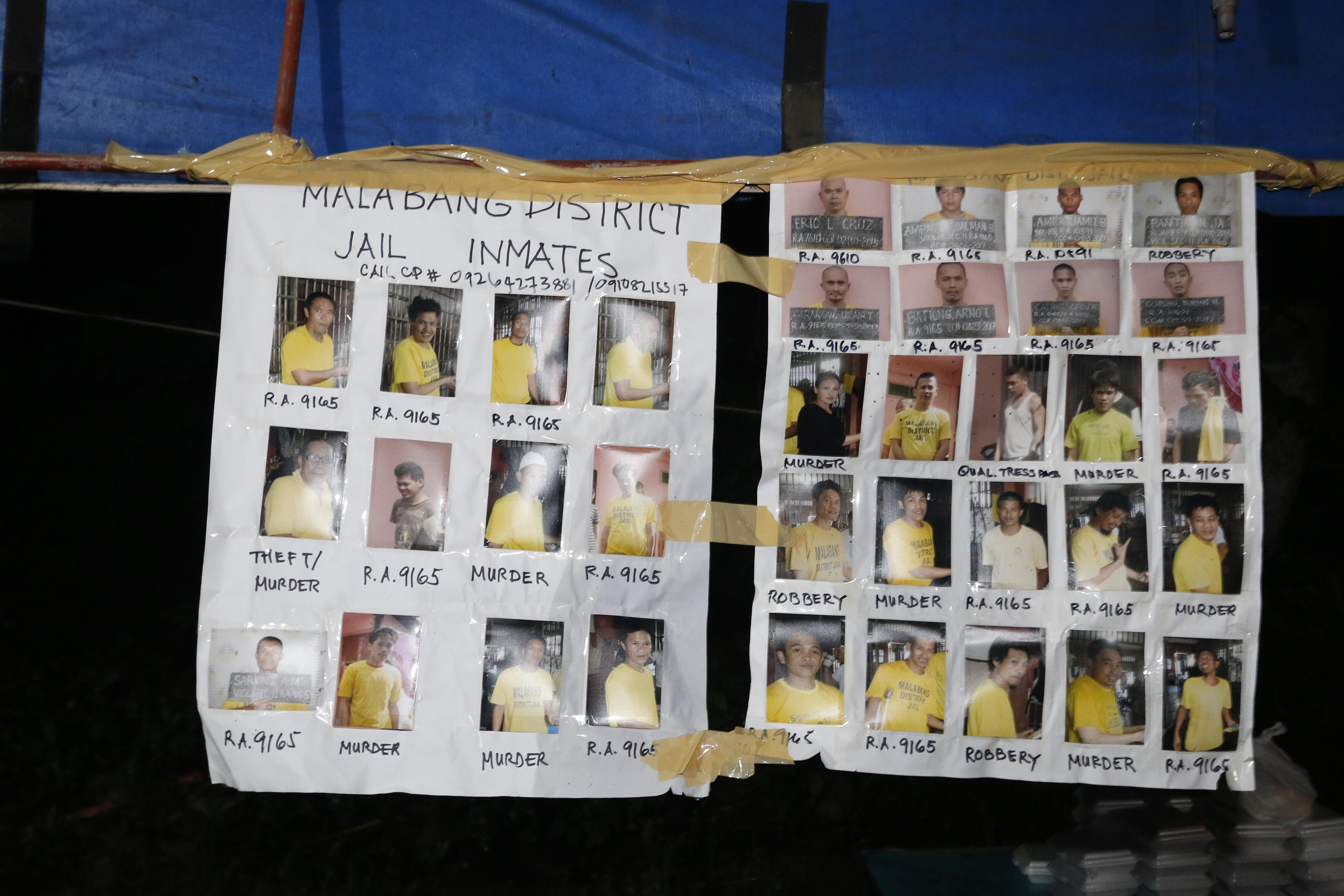
Listing of inmates of the Malabang District Jail at a PNP checkpoint

Firefights between government forces and militants began at approximately 2:00 PM. The Peace and Conflict Journalism Network reported that the clash occurred in the Basak Malutlut area of the city as Hapilon's forces called for reinforcements from the Maute group to prevent him from being arrested. Maute fighters occupied the Amai Pakpak Hospital and ordered PhilHealth employees out of the facility. The fighters allegedly replaced the Philippine flag hoisted in the hospital with the Black Standard used by the Islamic State group. A staff member of the hospital later denied that this happened.

The 103rd Brigade of the Philippine Army stationed at Camp Ranao was also attacked by at least 500 Maute militants. A number of militants were then seen waving their ISIS black flags as they roamed the streets of Marawi.

The whole city was put on lockdown as several buildings and houses were set ablaze by members of the Maute group. Dozens of gunmen occupied the Marawi City Hall as 107 inmates escaped from the Marawi City Jail and the Malabang District Jail 39 after the Maute attacks. Power and communication lines were also shut down due to the continued hostilities. Roads leading to Marawi were blocked by both government security forces and Maute militants. Civilians were reported to have been abducted by the Maute, including a priest, Father Chito Suganob and several parishioners of the Cathedral of Our Lady Help of Christians as the group demanded that the government stop its offensive against them.

The clashes sparked a mass evacuation of the city with residents fleeing by the thousands, causing traffic congestion on the highway to Iligan and Cagayan de Oro. At least eleven civilians were killed in the first hours of the fighting, two of which the Lanao del Sur Provincial Disaster Office identified as ambulance drivers who were stopped by militants while responding to an emergency call. Nine of them were on board a truck when they were stopped by militants at a checkpoint and shot dead with their hands tied. A police officer was also reported to have been beheaded by the militants.

==== May 24 ====
Additional government forces arrived at Laguindingan Airport as the military regained control of the Amai Pakpak Hospital. 120 civilians used as a human shield by the Maute group were rescued from the hospital. The military had also recaptured the city hall and the Mindanao State University.

==== May 25 ====
Fresh fighting took place near the Lanao del Sur Provincial Capitol in the city center. Black-clad Maute and Abu Sayyaf militants were spotted on the city's major roads and bridges. The militants also reportedly took control of the Lanao del Sur Electric Cooperative in Barangay Gadungan. The Armed Forces of the Philippines (AFP) said there were still three or four dozen Maute, as well as Abu Sayyaf leader Isnilon Hapilon, remaining in Marawi. The Philippine air force launched strikes against remnants of the group in three nearby villages.

Reports came in that two Malaysian terrorists who were with Isnilon Hapilon in Marawi to push for the creation of the Islamic State in Southeast Asia were killed. Intelligence sources also said that an Indonesian and a Saudi Arabian linked to ISIS were also killed in skirmishes. The AFP said that 26 of the around 50 Maute militants in the area were killed and 30 government soldiers were wounded.

==== May 26 ====
At a press briefing in Davao City, AFP Spokesperson Brig. Gen. Restituto Padilla stated that some of the terrorists were foreigners who had been in the country for quite some time, offering support to the Maute group in Marawi. He noted that of the twelve killed in a recent engagement, six were from out of the country.

Amid continuing operations against the terror groups, several houses, including the residence of Lanao del Sur's 2nd District Representative Mauyag Papandayan Jr., were seen burning as residents also reported seeing civilians killed after the military dropped bombs on Maute positions. Sources said the houses were targeted because of the presence of Maute snipers. According to AFP Western Mindanao Command chief Lt. Gen. Carlito Galvez Jr., dwellings in the area were intentionally set on fire so as to keep them from being used as cover by Maute fighters. Limited air strikes were also used on Maute sniper positions. Galvez insisted no civilians were reported killed in the air strikes.

Father Chito Suganob and his companions who were taken hostage by the Maute group on 23 May, were still being held by the group according to Marawi bishop Edwin de la Peña.

==== May 27 ====
1st Infantry Division spokesman Lt. Col. Jo-Ar Herrera told reporters that they identified where Maute fighters were consolidating and were conducting "surgical air strikes to destroy the local terrorist group." The AFP and the Philippine National Police Special Action Force continued their clearing operations by checking each house and building in the downtown area. During operations, troops encountered child soldiers as young as 10 years old armed with M-16 rifles being used by the Maute group.

90 percent of Marawi's population of more than 200,000 people had been evacuated to safer grounds, particularly in Iligan.

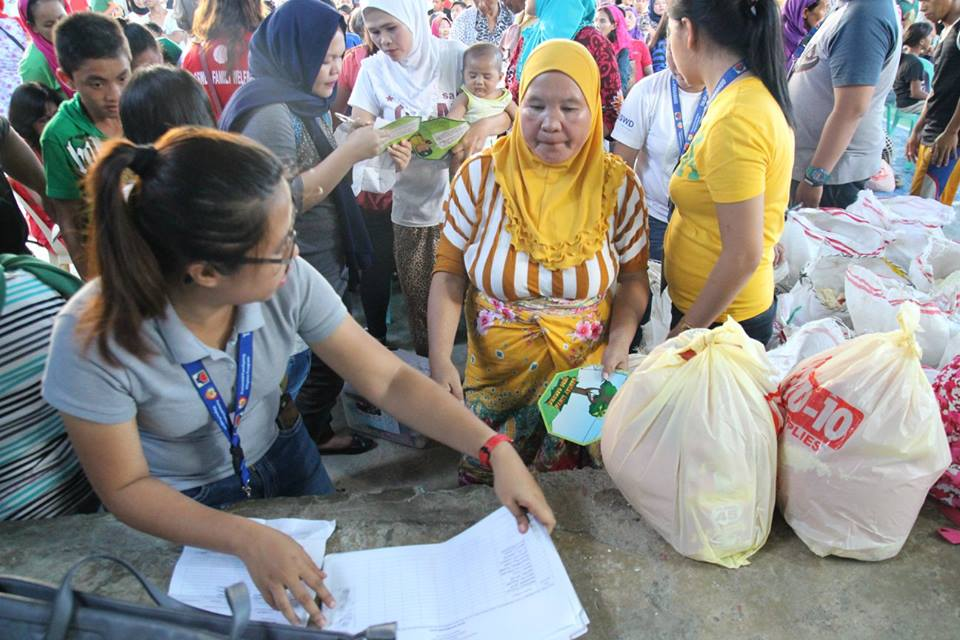
Internally displaced persons (IDPs) from Marawi staying in Iligan

==== May 28 ====
AFP spokesman Jo-Ar Herrera reported 19 civilians, some of whom were women and children, had been killed in Marawi. Some of the victims were later identified as local carpenters who were part of an evacuation convoy; the militants stopped the convoy and then massacred those who could not recite verses from the Quran. Authorities said that 2,000 civilians were trapped in militant-controlled areas.

Reports came in that 28 Malaysians had joined the Maute Group. Citing intelligence sources in Manila, a Malaysian newspaper reported that they arrived early last week supposedly for a religious event and may have also taken up arms, a conclusion they arrived at after 2 Malaysians were killed in firefights. The ongoing clash also raised concerns in Jakarta that extremist groups in Indonesia could be drawn to join the fight in Marawi as well.

Presidential Communications Secretary Martin Andanar appealed for foreign support in fighting the militants in Marawi.

==== May 29 ====
The "Peace Corridor" set up by combined forces of the Philippine government and Moro Islamic Liberation Front to hasten humanitarian efforts in support of affected Marawi residents. The orange line shows the scope of the corridor which covers Marawi itself and the towns of Marantao, Balindong, Tugaya, Bacolod-Kalawi, Madalum, Madamba, Ganassi, and Malabang.

The AFP said that the death toll in Marawi had reached 100, including 19 civilians and 61 militants. The military had also retaken most of Marawi previously occupied by the extremist groups. Presidential Spokesperson Ernesto Abella said that only small areas in the city remained under militants' control. The AFP also reported that fighters from the Bangsamoro Islamic Freedom Fighters in neighboring Maguindanao joined the Maute and Abu Sayyaf groups in Marawi and that the Abu Sayyaf leader Isnilon Hapilon remained holed up in the city.

Amid continuing air strikes and ground fighting, fourteen hostages managed to escape their Maute captors. The men said they were part of a group of 20 who had been taken captive on May 27 while evacuating the city. Their captors forced them to film a video appeal to President Rodrigo Duterte to accede to the militants' demands or the hostages would be killed. One of the hostages was indeed beheaded, they reported, and one drowned during the escape.

A spokesman for Nur Misuari said that he had ordered the Moro National Liberation Front (MNLF), which he chaired, to fight any Maute in Lanao del Sur. Misuari offered a unit of 500 to 700 MNLF fighters to help fight the extremists. Luis Jalandoni of the National Democratic Front stated his group was willing to help as well.

The Moro Islamic Liberation Front and the government decided to implement a "peace corridor" in Lanao del Sur as part of an effort to hasten humanitarian operations for displaced residents. The corridor stretched from Marawi down to Malabang.

==== May 30 ====
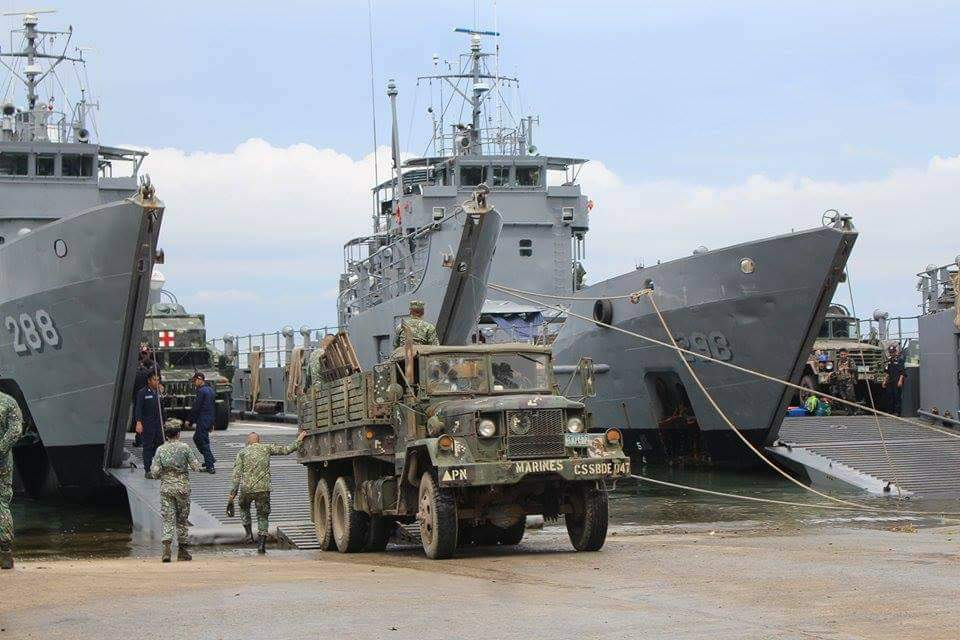
Naval Forces Western Mindanao sent off two Navy vessels to Marawi City on May 30, 2017, at Naval Station Romulo Espaldon, Calarian, Zamboanga City to transport Fleet-Marine Team to augment troops fighting against the Maute in Marawi City.

In a video, abducted priest Fr. Chito Soganub pleaded the government to stop their offensive against the militants and withdraw all their forces from Marawi and Lanao del Sur. Marawi Bishop Edwin de la Peña said that Soganub was relaying the Maute group's demands in exchange for the safety of Suganob and other people taken as hostages.

The city center remained under control of the militants, as two of three bridges leading to the area, the Mapandi and Bayabao bridges, still contained roadblocks and enemy vehicles with a black flag flying in front of them.

The Philippine Marines recovered eighteen high-powered firearms, police and military uniforms, and black flags from their two-day clearing operations in Marawi. They also reported that eight terrorists had been killed.

In a joint statement from the Philippine government and the MILF, chairman Murad Ebrahim said the MILF welcomed President Duterte's invitation for its forces to extend humanitarian assistance to civilians still trapped in Marawi.

==== May 31 ====
AFP spokesperson Restituto Padilla said that government forces have retaken 90 percent of Marawi, including parts of the city center and the two bridges that lead to it. According to Padilla, the surge in the number of militants was believed to have been due to the sympathizers they freed from the city jail, but that the military managed to secure all entry and exit points to prevent possible reinforcements for the militants.

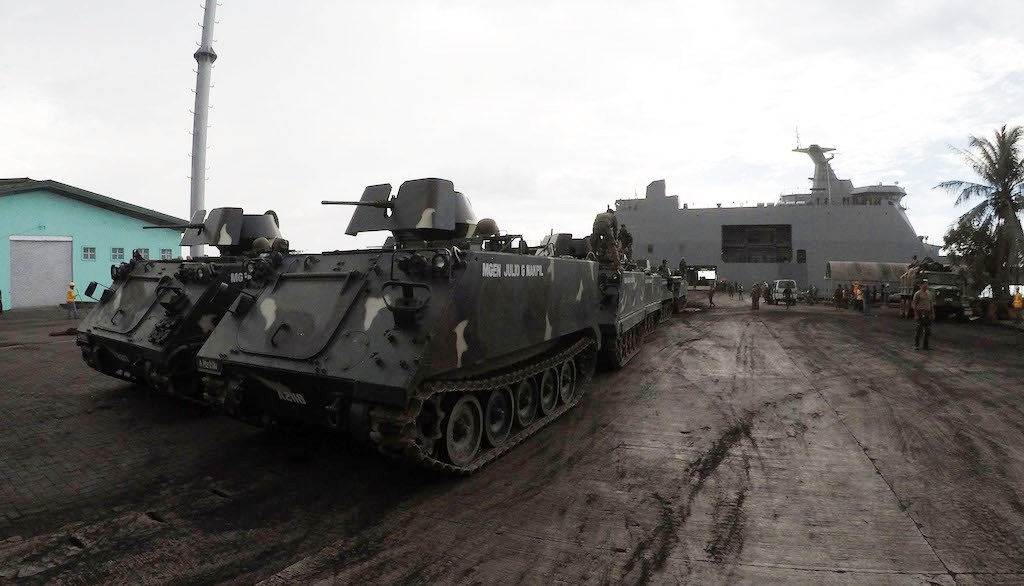
BRP Tarlac in Iligan offloading military units meant to augment government forces fighting in Marawi

The Associated Press reported that eleven soldiers were killed and seven others were wounded by friendly fire in a military air strike as the AFP struggled to drive off the militants from the city. An AFP spokesman said the incident happened when a SIAI-Marchetti SF.260 turboprop aircraft providing close air support "over militant positions" dropped a bomb that accidentally hit an army unit locked in close-range combat with the militants. Defense Secretary Delfin Lorenzana ordered an investigation on the incident. Following the incident, Senate President Aquilino Pimentel III asked for a review of the AFP's strategy in the ongoing campaign against the militant groups in Marawi. Senator Antonio Trillanes called the incident "tragic and unfortunate" as he called on the AFP to ensure that similar incidents would never happen again. Senator Panfilo Lacson encouraged the public to support the AFP as well as the investigation being conducted.

At least eight militants surrendered to government troops. According to AFP spokesman Restituto Padilla, the militants surrendered to the unit of Marine Task Force Tiger Tawi-tawi Commanding general Custodio Parcon and "provided very, very valuable intelligence." It was the first time that members of the militant groups had surrendered since the start of the fighting. Additional marines and relief supplies arrived via transport ship on May 31.

=== June ===
==== June 1 ====
In a news conference, Defense Secretary Lorenzana announced that eight foreign militants had been killed in Marawi, five of which they have identified as Malaysian, Indonesian, Saudi Arabian, Yemeni, and a Chechen. Lorenzana also said they revised their estimate of the number of militants involved in the Marawi attacks since last week from the initial 100 militants to 500 militants, which he said was composed of 260 Maute militants, 100 Abu Sayyaf militants under Isnilon Hapilon, and the rest from other local militant organizations. He said 280 militants fled the city, some of them mixing with civilians in neighboring towns while an estimated 50 to 100 militants remained in Marawi.

==== June 2 ====
Presidential spokesman Ernesto Abella dispelled speculations that the 2017 Resorts World Manila attack that occurred earlier in the day in Pasay was connected to the ongoing military offensive against the Maute group in Marawi or to ISIS. He also denied any possible terrorism link in the incident.

In a media update, the AFP said that the militants remained holed up in commercial buildings in the city center and that they believed Isnilon Hapilon was still in Marawi. The AFP also acknowledged that their deadline for completely taking back the city from the militant groups could not be met as they continued to put up significant resistance. The Indonesian Foreign Ministry through its embassy in Manila was able to rescue 17 of their citizens from Marawi with help from the AFP.

==== June 3 ====
President Duterte and Nur Misuari made an agreement that 2,000 MNLF fighters would be enlisted into the AFP and join in the fighting in Marawi. However, a few days later, both the AFP and Duterte himself issued statements that this would not be happening soon.

==== June 4 ====
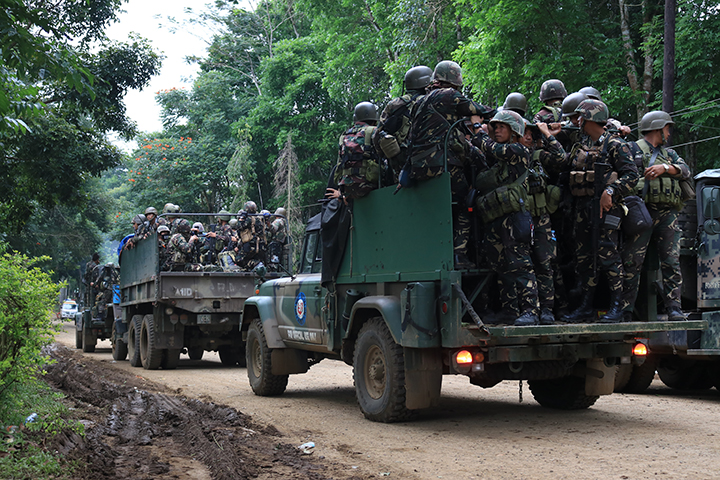
A convoy of Filipino soldiers participating in the Battle of Marawi in transit

A ceasefire agreement was reached between the Philippine government and Maute fighters remaining in Marawi. This ceasefire had been facilitated by the MILF, which had been asked by Duterte to help negotiate a settlement by which civilians still trapped in the city could be evacuated. The ceasefire was to begin at 8 A.M. and last for four hours. However, AFP units in the city refused to accept the terms of the ceasefire, and only allowed the evacuation of those individuals on the edges of the areas controlled by the militants. Fighting in the city broke out at 9 A.M. The army claimed that 179 civilians were evacuated, while the government claimed that 134 were evacuated, which was fewer than on preceding days and leaving about 2,000 civilians trapped in the city. Two soldiers were injured.

Authorities claimed that the total number of civilian casualties had increased from 20 to 38, all killed by militants, while residents claimed that airstrikes had killed dozens of civilians.

==== June 6 ====
Police in Davao City arrested Cayamora Maute, the 67-year-old patriarch of the leaders of the Maute group. He was arrested at a Task Force Davao checkpoint in Sirawan, Toril District. Cayamora was aboard a van wearing a surgical mask to avoid identification when they were stopped at the checkpoint.

==== June 9 ====
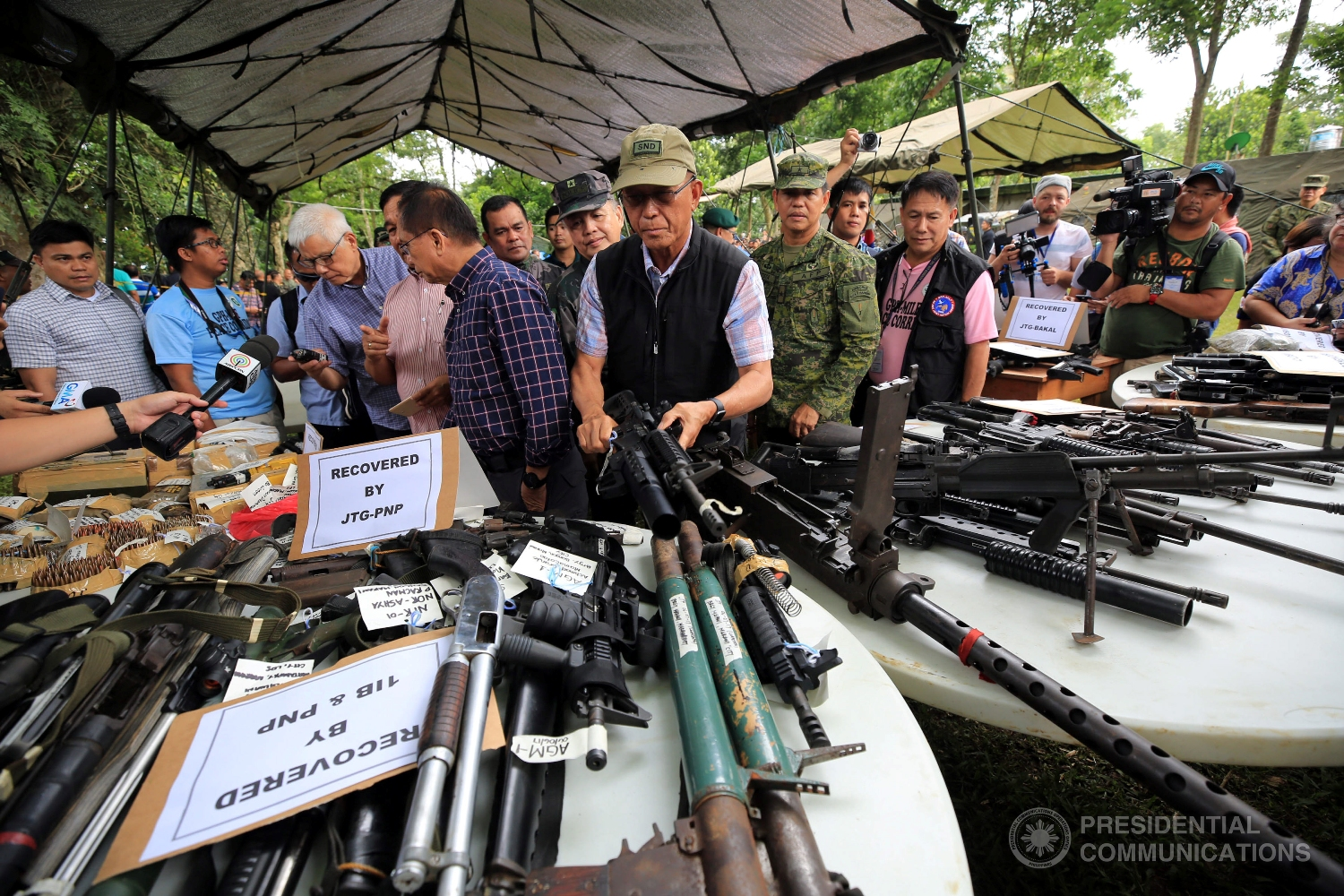
Members of the government cabinet inspecting weapons retrieved by security forces from ASG-Maute militants.

Police received information and arrested the mother of the Maute group leaders, Ominta Romato Maute. Ominta, also known as Farhana, was arrested in Masiu, Lanao del Sur, along with two other wounded family members and 7 other unidentified females. It was also reported that 13 Philippine Marines had been killed and 40 wounded during a clearing operation in Marawi. US Special Forces were deployed to the city in an advisory role.

==== June 11 ====
The AFP announced that it had so far killed 191 Maute group terrorists in the ongoing operations to clear Marawi.

==== June 12 ====
On Philippines' Independence day, the Philippine Government raised the Philippine flag in several places in Marawi such as Marawi City Hall, the Lanao del Sur Provincial Capitol, Camp Ranao, Mindanao State University, Amai Pakpak Hospital and several roads in the city. Meanwhile, clashes continued.

==== June 16 ====
The AFP announced that they had begun "normalization operations" and coordination with local government units in restoring the situation in Marawi back to normal. Clashes against the militants continued. The Philippine Army stated that it had secured 90% of Marawi.

==== June 19 ====
The AFP raided a Maute safehouse and recovered bags of shabu (methamphetamine hydrochloride) and related drug paraphernalia. Captain Eric Estrevillo of the 49th Infantry Battalion stated on a press conference that Maute group members were using shabu to endure long battles, and in addition, looked "high" during combat.

==== June 23 ====
The Philippine government accepted Australia's offer to send two AP-3C Orion surveillance aircraft to assist the AFP in Marawi.

==== June 24 ====
According to some news websites, the leader of Abu Sayyaf and the emir of the ISIS Philippines Isnilon Hapilon withdrew from Marawi, according to Lt. Gen. Carlito Galvez, the head of Western Mindanao Command. However, the reports were later disproved.

The AFP declared an 8-hour ceasefire effective from 6:00 am on June 25 to give way for the observance of Eid el-Fitr but maintained that the ceasefire will be lifted if the militants open fire at government forces or civilians.

==== June 25 ====
At 6:50 a.m. amidst a congressional prayers for the Eid al-Fitr celebration held at the provincial capitol building, suspected gunshots were heard a few minutes after the unilateral ceasefire by the government was declared. Entrance and exit points to Marawi remained guarded by government security forces against the influx of aid to Maute forces and assist civilians fleeing the city.

Civilian volunteers along with MILF members took advantage of the ceasefire to repatriate civilians in opposing combat areas. Maute snipers opened fire at some government held positions but none of the clashes during the ceasefire were deemed major by the government. When the unilateral ceasefire expired, full-scale hostilities continued.

==== June 30 ====
The two surveillance planes committed by Australia started conducting operations in Marawi. Filipino pilots and technicians were aboard the aircraft and assisted in relaying information to forces on the ground. The mission involving the planes was set to last for two weeks.

=== July ===
==== July 3 ====
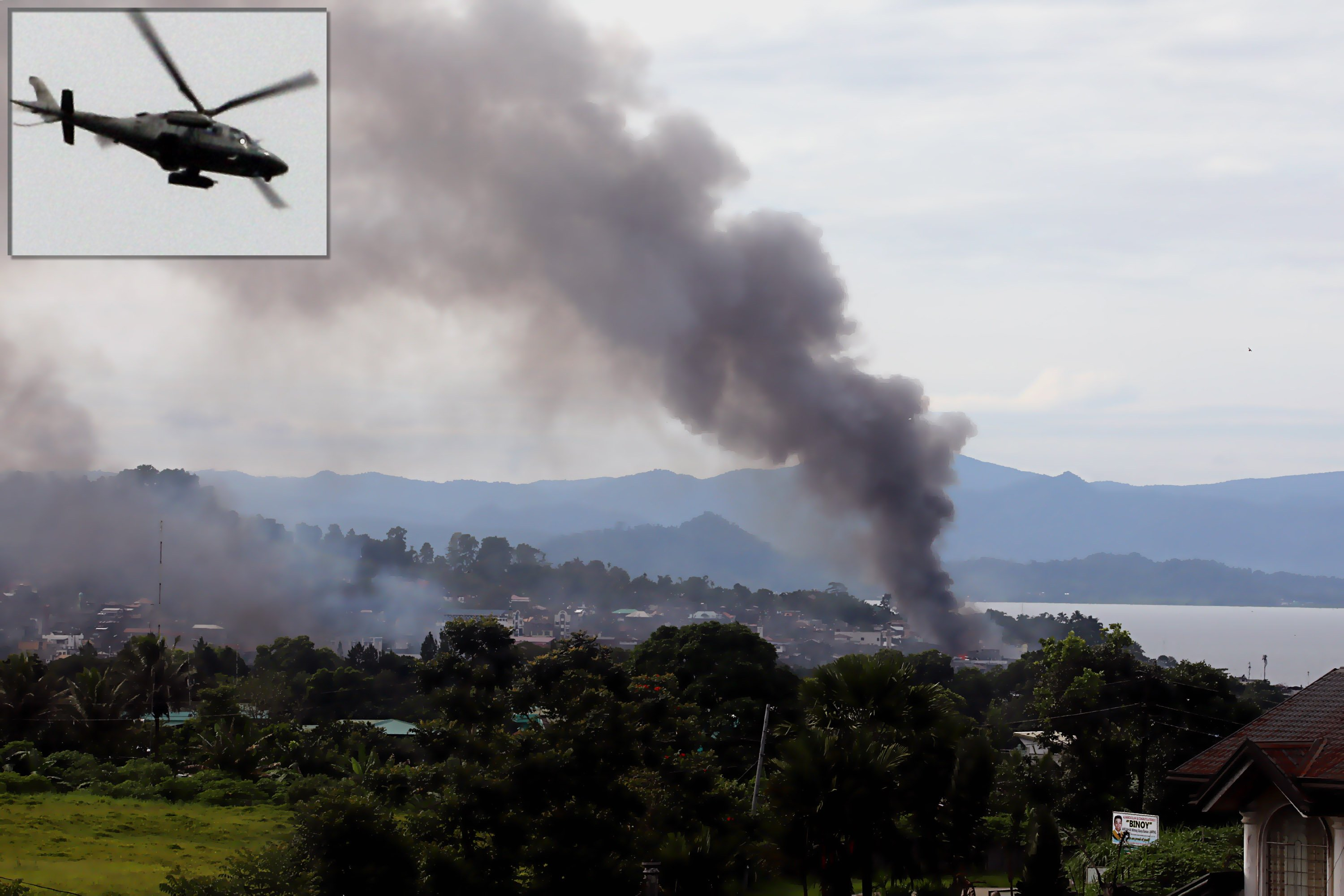
An attack helicopter of the Philippine Air Force conducting airstrikes

Defense Secretary Lorenzana said Isnilon Hapilon was believed to be hiding inside one of the mosques in Marawi.

==== July 4 ====
Presidential spokesman Ernesto Abella confirmed reports that Maute looted an estimated P500 million worth of money from Marawi. Dansalan College, which had been used by the militants as a sniper roost, was retaken by government troops and 410 firearms were recovered since clearing operations began.

==== July 12 ====
An FA-50PH Golden Eagle fighter jet missed a target by 250 meters (820 ft) resulting in friendly fire which killed two soldiers and injured 11 others. All FA-50s were grounded pending an investigation while other air assets of the Philippine Air Force remained operating in Marawi.

==== July 13 ====
As of 7 p.m., the AFP had killed 394 terrorists and recovered 498 firearms. But government fatalities numbered 93 while the terrorists killed 45 civilians. Soldiers were able to rescue 1,723 people from the city but said there were still some 300 civilians who were either trapped by the fighting or taken hostage by the terrorists.

==== July 18 ====
President Duterte called upon Congress to extend until December 31, 2017, the declaration of martial law and the suspension of privilege of the writ of habeas corpus in Mindanao.

==== July 19 ====
President Duterte said the Marawi crisis birthed a "newly evolving type of urban warfare" and his declaration of martial law in Mindanao is meant to fight this menace. In the full text of his letter to Congress released on that day, Duterte said this type of warfare is "characterized by the rebels' total disregard for civilian lives, cruelty to combatants and non-combatants alike, widespread looting, and pillaging of occupied communities." He added this particular kind of warfare resulted in a "significant number of casualties," and firefights that have prevented government troops from moving forward as well as clean up operations.

==== July 20 ====
Militant control over Mapandi Bridge ended when government forces took control of the structure.

==== July 22 ====
Through a joint session of the Philippine Congress, 16 senators, and 261 congressmen, voted in favor (versus 18 opponents and no congressmen abstaining) of President Duterte's request for the extension of Proclamation Order No. 216—Imposing Martial Law in Mindanao until December 31, 2017.

==== July 27 ====
Agakhan Sharief, a Marawi-based Muslim cleric well known to the Maute clan, stated in November 2017 that the militants had asked Muslim leaders to urge President Duterte at the time in allowing the militants to escape in return for release of the hostages. He stated that they had asked for help in arranging for the MILF to receive the hostages and escorting the militants out of the city. The MILF's top peace negotiator, Mohagher Iqbal, confirmed the Maute proposal, but the government had ignored it. Secretary Lorenzana said that the president was aware of the offer but it was "too little, too late."

=== August ===
==== August 18 ====
Joint Task Force Marawi stated that the main battle area of the conflict was now confined to an area of covering 800 by 600 meters (2,600 ft × 2,000 ft). 400 buildings remained uncleared from Maute elements by government forces.

==== August 19 ====
Maute militants were now confined to an area near the city's Grand Mosque with 40 civilians believed to be still held hostage.

==== August 22 ====
Government forces recaptured the Marawi City Police Station. Among the first features seized by ISIL-link militants in the early part of the battle, the police station was considered a "strategic location" by the AFP.

==== August 23–24 ====
The Grand Mosque where hostages by ISIL-linked militants were allegedly held was recaptured by government forces. However, troops did not encounter any militants or the hostages when they entered the building.

==== August 25–29 ====
Captain Jo-Ann Petinglay, the spokesman of Joint Task Force Marawi, stated that the military had recaptured Saint Mary's Catholic Cathedral, one of the first facilities occupied by the militants when they laid siege to the city. AFP Chief of Staff General Eduardo Año said that their leaders had been cornered in a battle zone restricted to 500 m^{2} (5,400 sq ft). The AFP reported the deaths of 10 militants who tried to sneak from Lake Lanao into Marawi as reinforcements.

=== September ===
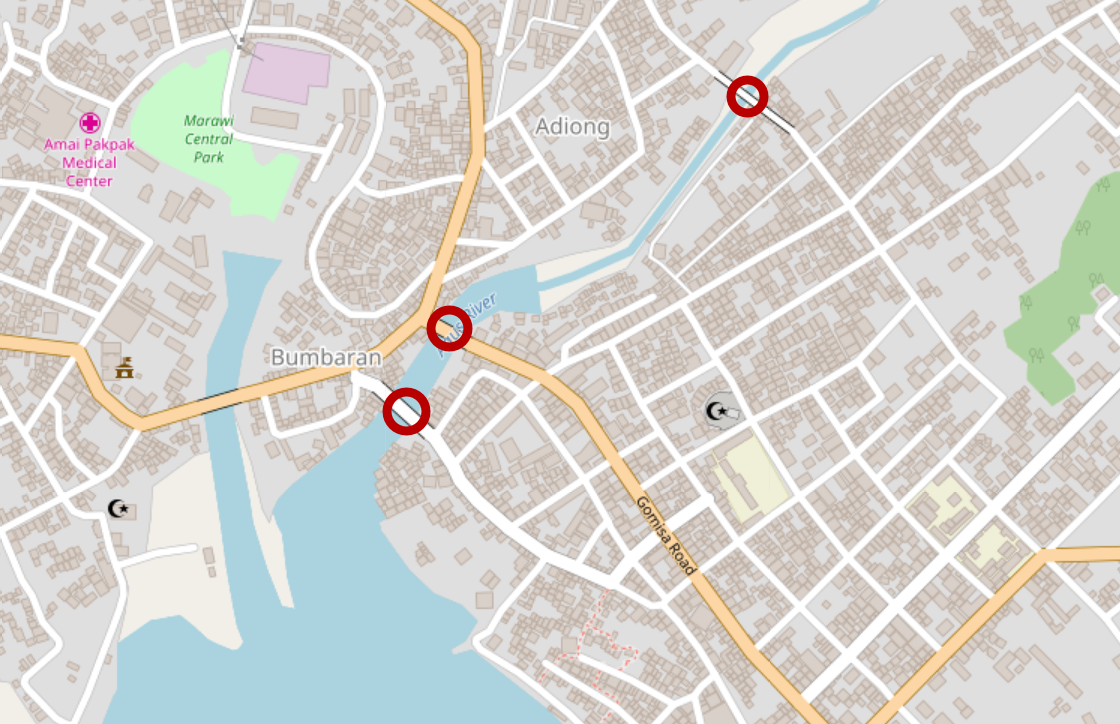
The following bridges above Agus River in Marawi were tagged as strategic by government forces along with dates when the government secured control over the structures; from top to bottom: Mapandi Bridge (July 20); Bayabao (Banggolo) Bridge (September 1); Raya Madaya (Masiu) Bridge (September 24); ISIL-linked militants were concentrated on the west side of the river.

==== September 1 ====
The military took control of Bayabao Bridge after clashes which saw three soldiers and five militants killed. The structure, which connected the conflict area to the city center was the second bridge recaptured by government forces.

==== September 16 ====
At around 17:00, government forces regained control over the Bato Mosque and the Amaitul Islamiya Marawi Foundation building which was used by the militants as their control center after a five-hour gunfight. At 17:00, Father Chito Soganub was found by government forces abandoned by his captors near the mosque and flown to Davao City to meet President Duterte.

==== September 24 ====
Government forces secured Masiu Bridge, also known as the Raya Madaya Bridge, one of the critical bridges which the militants had occupied and which led to Lake Lanao, depriving the militants of an escape route.

==== September 25 ====
The Sultan of Marawi, Sultan Hamidullah Atar, following President Duterte's earlier offer for a dialogue with the militants, offered to mediate between the Maute Group and government forces to spare civilians still trapped inside Marawi and pave way for the possible release of hostages. Atar, who is also a conflict mediation professional, said talks with the Maute group could be done through the traditional mechanisms as they are also Maranaos. He related that he was able to link up with several members of the Maute group while he was also trapped in Marawi for 4 days.

=== October ===
==== October 10 ====
Eight foreign militants, along with Isnilon Hapilon and Omar Maute, were acting as leaders of the militants by then, according to the AFP.

==== October 16 ====
Isnilon Hapilon and Omar Maute were reportedly killed during a hostage rescue operation, according to a statement released by Defense Secretary Lorenzana. On the same day, the Philippine Army estimated that there were about 100 militants still fighting in Marawi.

==== October 17 ====
Rodrigo Duterte declares Marawi liberated from terrorist influence on October 17, 2017.

Following the deaths of Omar Maute and Isnilon Hapilon, President Duterte declared the liberation of Marawi. At around 2 p.m., he addressed a crowd, saying: "I hereby declare Marawi City liberated from the terrorist influence that marks the beginning of rehabilitation of Marawi." AFP Chief Gen. Eduardo Año said that the announcement meant that the conflict is substantially over now that the militants' leaders were killed. However, he maintained that there were skirmishes and that 20–30 militants with 20 hostages remained confined in a 2 hectares (4.9 acres) area in the city.

==== October 18 ====
Military officials stated that 4 militants had been killed, while 10 soldiers were injured in fighting that continued after President Duterte's "liberation" declaration.

==== October 19 ====
The AFP said that senior ISIL commander Mahmud Ahmad may have been among 13 militants killed overnight, though they were still trying to verify his death with two rescued hostages stating that he had died and was buried. Meanwhile, seven more hostages were rescued. Seven more terrorists were killed on October 19 according to AFP.

==== October 20 ====
Lt. Gen. Carlito Galvez stated that they had rescued 10 hostages, while 11 people, about whom it was not known whether they were hostages or Maute members, were also in their custody. He added that four hostages were still being held by the terrorists while a small band of Maute fighters were making a last stand in three buildings. Padilla added that a soldier was killed, while three others were wounded in military operations during the day. The military meanwhile started a gradual pullout of troops from the battle zone following the mission against Hapilon and Omar.

==== October 21 ====
Galvez stated that about 20 militants, including five significant figures, remained in a small area of the city. He also added that they were closing in on three sons of Hapilon, two Malaysians including Amin Bacu, and a prominent Indonesian militant. Ground commander Gen. Danilo Pamonag declared victory on the same day, however the AFP stated that Maute fighters were still resisting in a small area. Baco and an Indonesian, Ibno Kayin, were named as their leaders.

==== October 22 ====
Deputy commander of operations Col. Romeo Brawner Jr., told a press conference that an estimated 30 people, including militants and some of their family members, were fighting to hold a fortified two-story building next to Lake Lanao, which was the final militant-held building in Marawi. He added that soldiers were using loudspeakers to urge them to surrender and that the military did not know who their leader was. Brawner also declared that the AFP had rescued the last 20 hostages. As of then, 919 militants and 165 security personnel had been killed in the battle.

==== October 23 ====
The AFP cleared the final militant-held building in Marawi, fully recapturing the city. AFP Chief General Eduardo Año said that the bodies of 42 militants were found in two buildings and a mosque in the battle zone, stating that it was possible that some militants were still hiding. The bodies also included two wives of Maute gunmen. Meanwhile, Defense Secretary Lorenzana announced the end of the battle and the end of combat operations in the area. He added that Bacu was believed to be among the dead militants. Intelligence sources later stated that he was among the last three or four militants who could have escaped. However, in November, the Philippine Army stated that they believed that Amin Bacu had been killed during the battle, and that the remnants of the Maute group were now largely leaderless.

== Casualties ==
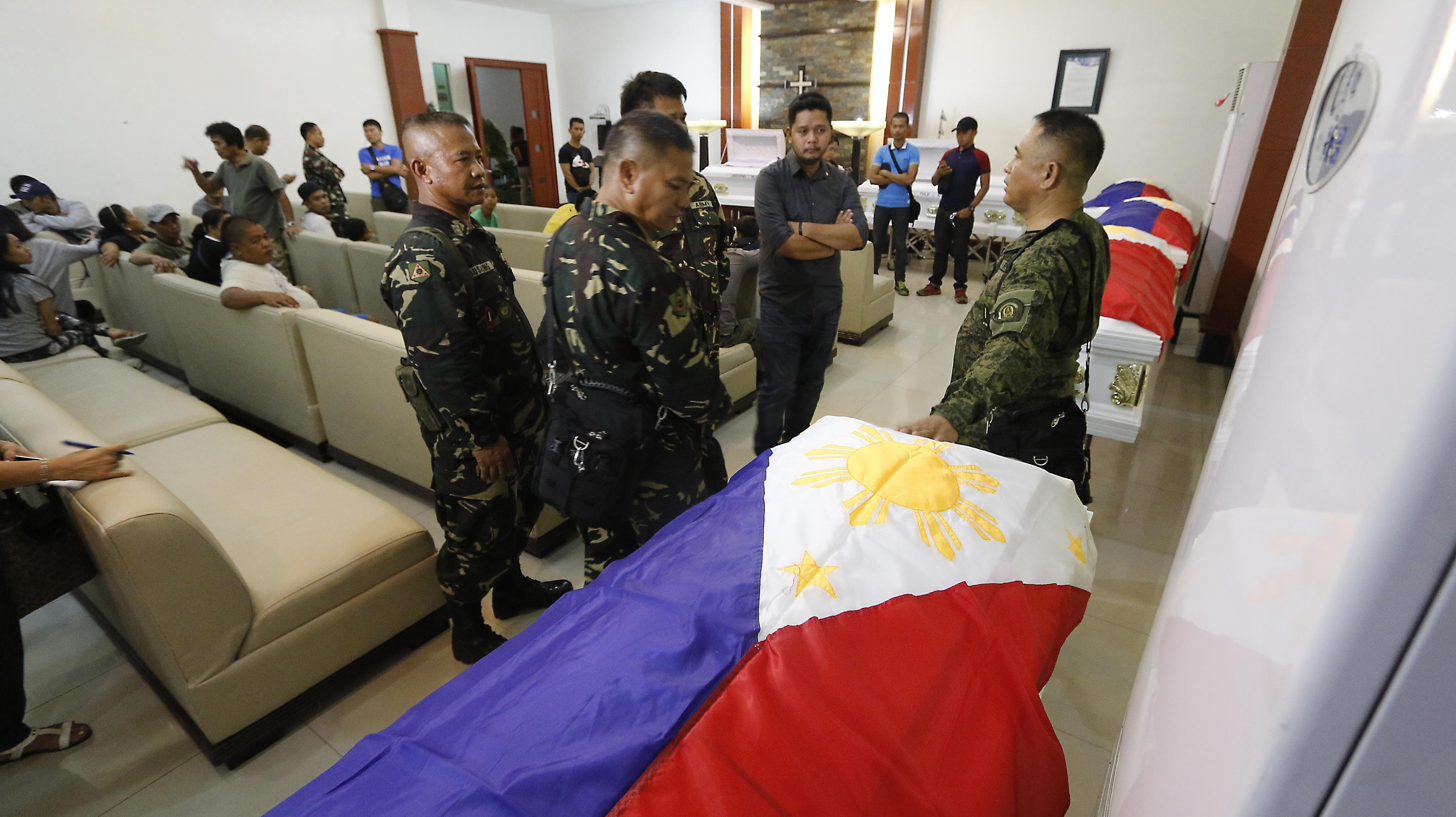
Wake for soldiers who died in the conflict

The casualties reported were as follows:

- 978 militants killed (13 foreigners)
- 12 militants captured (1 foreigner)
- 168 government forces killed (12 by friendly fire)
- 1,400+ government forces wounded
- 87 civilians dead (40 due to illness)
- 10 armored vehicles lost (estimated)

The police chief of Malabang, Romeo Enriquez, whose beheading was cited by Duterte as one of the bases for his declaration of martial law in a speech on May 24, 2017, was later found to be alive. The police officer actually killed was identified by the ARMM PNP as Senior Inspector Freddie Solar, a former police chief of Malabang and member of the Drug Enforcement Unit of the Lanao del Sur Provincial Police.

The Armed Forces of the Philippines' highest-ranking combat casualty was Rommel Sandoval, a Captain commanding a company of the Philippine Army Scout Rangers. Sandoval was posthumously conferred the Medal of Valor. Among the soldiers killed during the early stages of the siege was Private First Class Dhan Ryan Bayot. He was posthumously awarded the Order of Lapu-Lapu in recognition of his service during the conflict.

Along with the casualties, much of Marawi was flattened in what was described as the heaviest urban fighting in the Philippines since World War II.

=== Deaths of evacuees due to diseases ===
According to the Philippines' Health Department report on June 16, at least 40 evacuees, who were staying outside evacuation centers, died of dehydration, while 19 others died as a result of diseases contracted due to living in congested evacuation camps. The following month, the Health Secretary denied this report and stated just four evacuees died of dehydration, instead of 40. However, in September, it was once again reported 40 evacuees had died due to illness.

== Aftermath ==
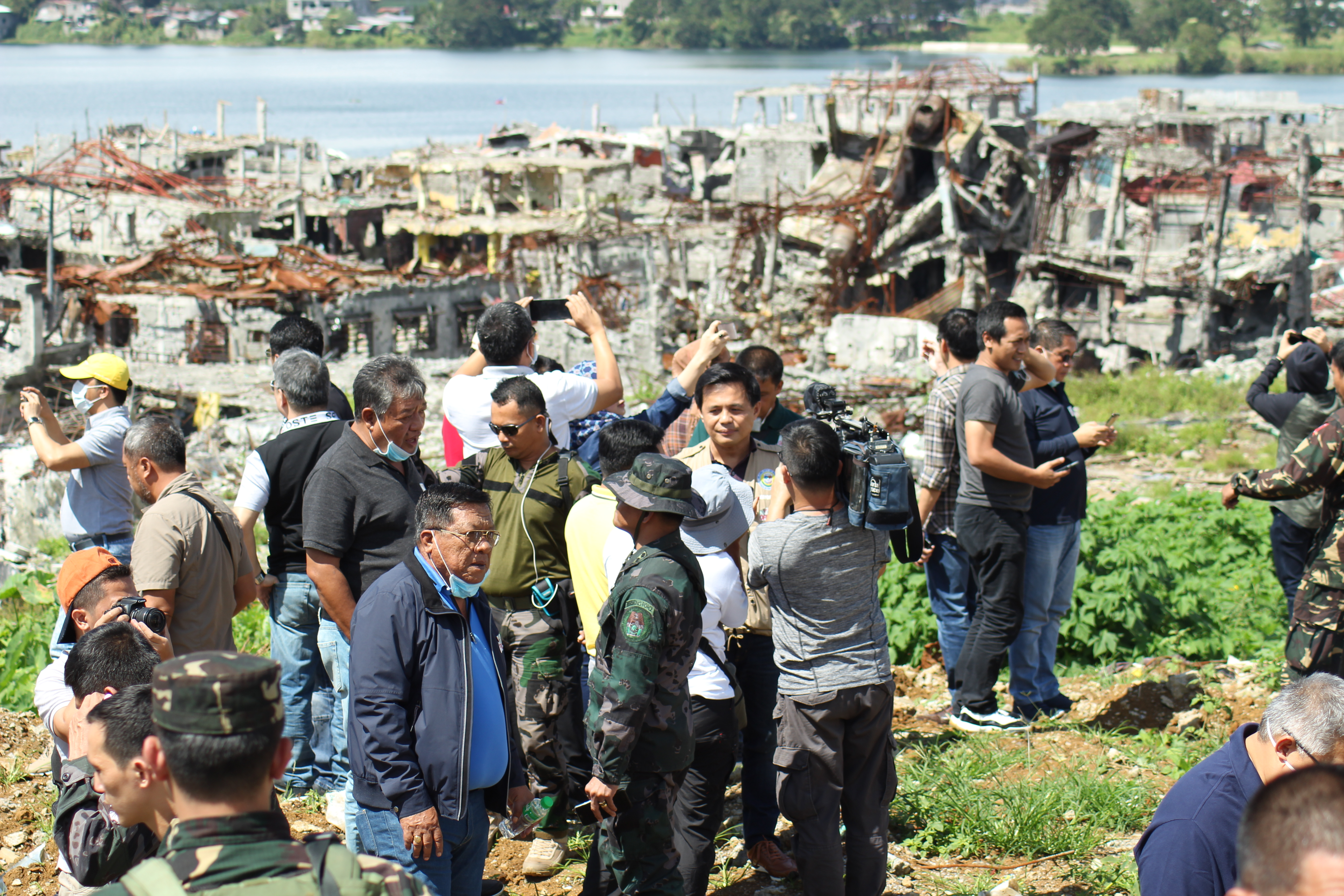
Lanao del Sur government officials visit the so-called "Ground Zero" or "Main Battle Area" in Marawi for the first time following the end of the conflict.

=== Post-battle fighting and clearing operations ===
After the end of military operations, the AFP killed a suspected surviving militant trying to escape on October 31, according to Col. Romeo Brawner. Muhammad Ilham Syaputra, an Indonesian militant who reportedly played a role in the 2016 Jakarta attacks, was caught near Marawi on November 1. He was caught while trying to escape from a district where several Maute fighters had been hiding, according to the police. Military officials stated on the next day that two militants engaged in a firefight with AFP and were killed during the night of November 1. Task Force Ranao deputy commander Romeo Brawner stated that Abu Talha, who was Hapilon's trusted aide for years, in addition to an unidentified militant, were killed while hiding in a building.

In the aftermath of Marawi Battle, terrorist threats in the Philippines persist. Sporadic fighting continued following the declaration of victory, with troops battling some fighters hiding amid the ruins. The military stated on November 6 that nine more militants were killed in day-long clashes. Brawner stated that one of them was Ibrahim Maute alias Abu Jamil, a cousin of the Maute brothers. Philippine National Police chief Ronald dela Rosa meanwhile claimed that Amin Baco was still alive and had become the new emir. Military officials however said they believed Baco had been killed during the clashes on the same day or in recent weeks. Lt. Gen. Carlito Galvez said at a separate briefing that Baco and Abdullah, one of Hapilon's sons, could be among the nine who were killed. Two more militants were later killed, raising their death toll to 11, according to the military.

On November 16, the AFP stated that they believed there were no more stragglers in Marawi, due to the lack of fighting between both sides for the past few weeks. Galvez confirmed in December 2017 the deaths of all the Maute brothers had been killed by AFP. He added that the military was continuing its manhunt for Abu Dar, a senior Maute leader. Dar was reported in January 2018 to have recruited new fighters from the cash and gold looted in Marawi. A year after the Battle of Marawi, threats of the Islamic State in the Philippines were still alive. Even three years after, terrorist threats in the Philippines emanating from the pro-ISIS groups continue unabated even during the COVID-19 pandemic.

=== Infrastructure damage ===
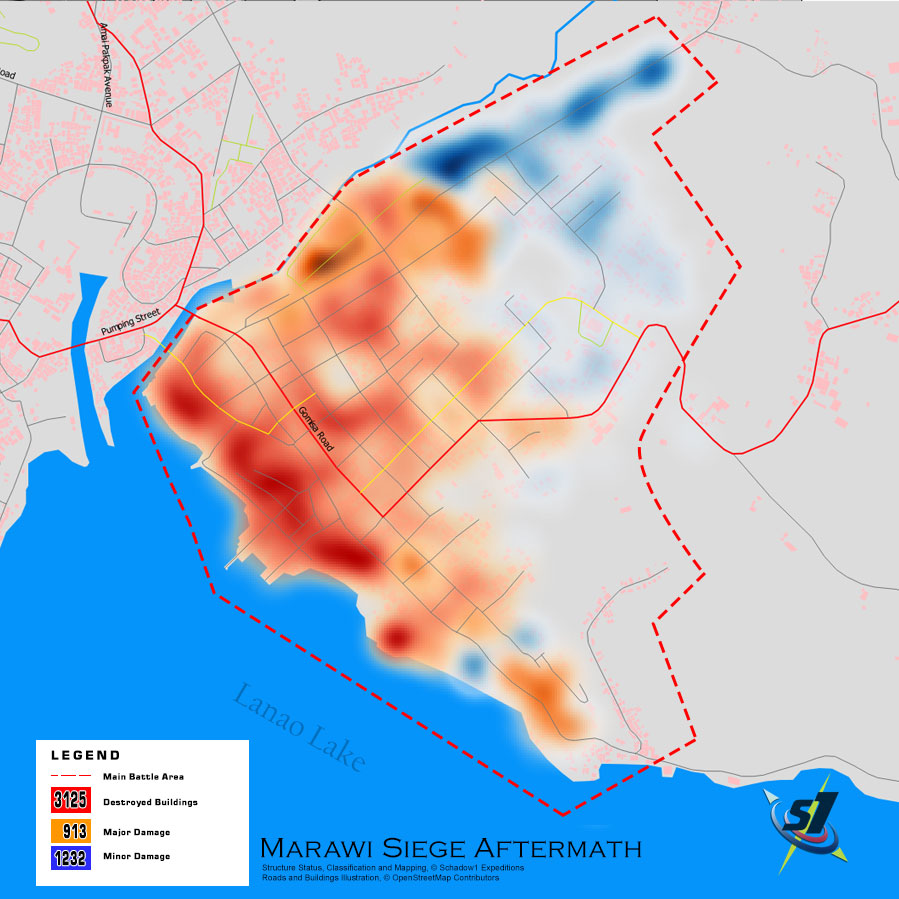
Map of the destruction left in the main battle area after the five-month-long battle in Marawi

The battle left the city in ruins with 95 percent of the structures within the 4 square kilometres (1.5 sq mi) of the main battle area to be heavily damaged or completely collapsed. 3,152 buildings were completely destroyed and 2,145 buildings were partially to heavily damaged due to the five-month heavy bombardment during the war.

=== Displacement of residents ===
Government estimates placed the number of residents displaced during the crisis at 200,000. About 70 percent of displaced residents lived in nearby temporary government shelters as of May 2018. According to a United Nations estimate in December 2017, the number of indigenous Lumads that have been displaced is at 2,500.

According to the United Nations; 98 Percent of Marawi's population were forcibly displaced by the fighting

The Battle for Marawi took a heavy toll on infrastructure and private property in the city quarter where the battle was concentrated. At one point, over 200,000 of the civilian population evacuated to neighboring cities and towns such as Iligan, Cagayan de Oro, and Lanao Norte coastal towns at the start of hostilities. In April 2018, the government allowed limited return to residential areas due to the danger of a reported eight unexploded ordnance, one 60-millimeter mortar, one hand grenade, six 40-millimeter rounds of ammunition, and 70 undetonated bombs dropped by the Philippine military, according to Joint Task Force Ranao commander Maj. Gen. Roseller Guanzon Murillo of the Philippine Army's 1st Infantry Tabak Division.

By May 2018, around 70 percent of Marawi's residents had returned home. According to the Philippines' Department of Social Welfare and Development, 64,364 displaced families have returned to the city as of July 2018. As of March 2019, around 70,000 people were still displaced.

=== Human rights concerns ===
An Amnesty International report released on November 16, 2017, blamed the militants and government forces of widespread abuses, some of which amount to war crimes. It was based on interviews with 48 survivors and witnesses, as well as local leaders, journalists and activists. It accused pro-ISIL fighters of extrajudicial killings and hostage-taking while accusing soldiers of mistreating people in custody. It also stated that government shelling caused widespread destruction in Marawi, civilians were trapped in crossfire and all parties engaged in looting.

Per the report, the pro-ISIL fighters targeted and brutally killed Christians or anyone who couldn't recite Shahada (profession of Muslim faith). Victims of pro-ISIL fighters were either held hostage or killed. Amnesty International documented at least 25 extrajudicial killings at their hands. Hostages were tortured and abused, made to forage for food, collected and buried cadavers, dug foxholes for fighters, made IEDs, were forced to fight the Army or used as sex slaves. Those attempting to escape were shot or beheaded, Amnesty International said.

Meanwhile, Amnesty International also reported that several survivors accused that they were shot at, beaten and tortured by Philippine Marines to make them confess of being an ISIL member, with one survivor stating he was doused with a hot liquid. Witnesses also said that 10 hostages were killed in air strikes by pro-government forces. It questioned whether civilian deaths and "large-scale destruction" in government air and ground attacks were "militarily necessary and proportional to the threat posed" by the fighters. It also questioned whether the operations met the requirements under international humanitarian law based on the fact that the military carried out bombings even after it declared only a few militants remained alive.

AFP reiterated in November 2018 its commitment to protecting human rights in response to the report by Amnesty International. AFP spokesman Maj. Gen. Restituto Padilla said soldiers accused of abuses will be investigated and those found guilty will be disciplined. He gave filing of looting charges against an army officer and five soldiers as an example of the commitment. In response to claims of "disproportionate air and ground attacks" by AFP, he asked the public to take into consideration the difficulties faced by it.

According to a Mindanao-based human rights group, there have been 130 reported cases of extrajudicial killings one year into the declaration of martial law in Mindanao, with most of the victims being peasants and indigenous Lumads.

=== City restoration ===
The rehabilitation and restoration of the city officially began on October 18, 2017, but efforts began in June 2017 even as the battle was ongoing. Rehabilitation is estimated to cost ₱53 billion to 80 billion, according to projections by NEDA and Task Force Bangon Marawi. Some displaced residents remain in relocation sites on the outskirts of the city.

== Reactions ==
=== Domestic ===
==== Government ====
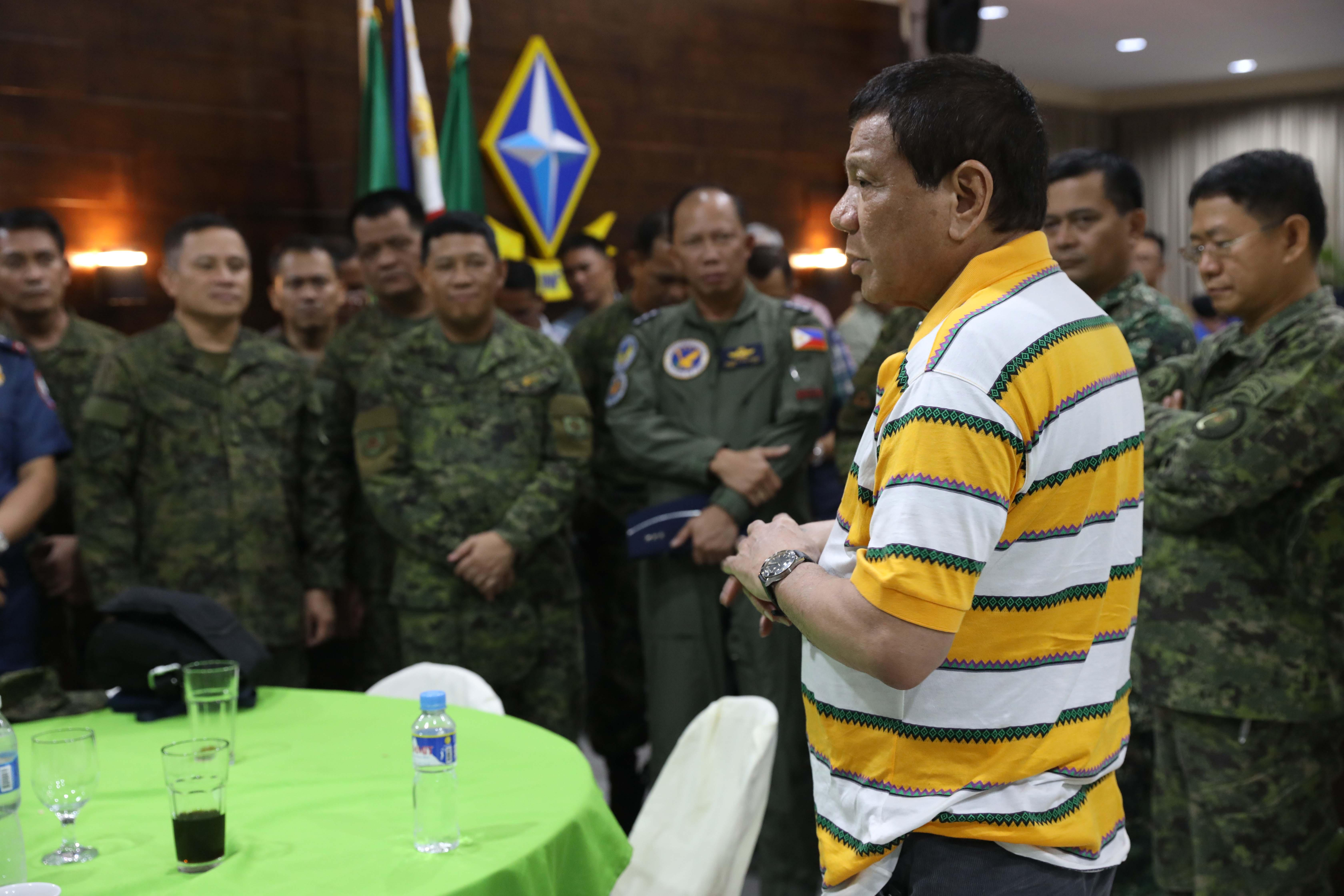
Duterte briefs the 4th Infantry Division at the troops' Headquarters-6 regarding the crisis.

===== National government =====
Following the clash, Duterte declared martial law in Mindanao at 10:00 in the evening (UTC+8) of May 23, 2017. As per the 1987 Constitution, the state of martial law will initially last for 60 days. Duterte also decided to shorten his diplomatic visit to Russia.

Leni Robredo started organizing donations and directing relief operations for the victims.

Several checkpoints were set up in Metro Manila on May 28, 2017.

The Department of Education launched the Brigada for Marawi (transl. "Brigade for Marawi") program to help displaced teachers and students from Marawi. As part of the program, the department has solicited donations from the public, tracked displaced teachers and students and provided psychological aid to affected teachers. The Department of Social Welfare and Development pledged to provide one-time aid of ₱1,000 to each displaced family. It is meant to enable Muslim families to still observe Ramadan.

An inter-agency task force called the Task Force Bangon Marawi was set up on June 28, 2017, to facilitate the rehabilitation of Marawi after the conflict subsides.

The government decided in July 2017 to withdraw its financial support for the Philippine Olympic Committee to host the 2019 Southeast Asian Games; reallocating funds meant for the hosting of the games for the rehabilitation of Marawi. However, the government later rescinded the cancellation and held the games.

===== Local government units =====
The government of the Autonomous Region in Muslim Mindanao has allocated ₱35 million as aid for displaced Marawi residents. The regional health department has also set up an operations center for the displaced. Other governments in Mindanao have also provided relief aid such as Compostela Valley and Davao City.

In a manifesto, all mayors of Lanao del Sur in August 2017 labeled the Maute Group and its sympathizers as an "Enemy of the Maranao People" and also classified the group under the ISIL.

==== Institutions ====
The University of Makati began admitting displaced people from Marawi, and children of soldiers who fought in the conflict under a scholarship program.

==== Religious sectors and community leaders ====
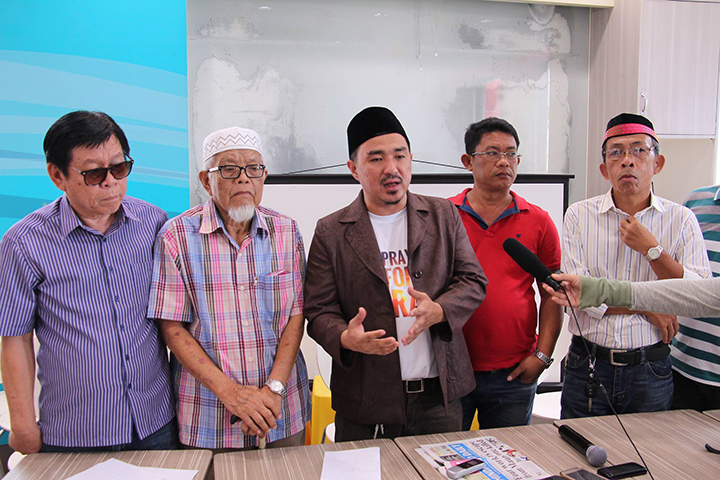
Lanao sultans making an open letter to Duterte urging for the quick resolution of the Battle of Marawi

The President of the Catholic Bishops' Conference of the Philippines, Socrates Villegas, on Wednesday, 24 May, asked for prayers after Maute militants took a priest and some parishioners hostage in Marawi. The CBCP President also asked the government forces to "make the safety of the hostages a primordial consideration" while ensuring that the law is upheld. The Philippine Center for Islam and Democracy condemned the acts of the militant groups saying that their acts were contrary to the teachings of Islam. The Muslim group noted that the incident occurred at the time when Muslims were preparing for Ramadan, which according to them made the acts of the militants more heinous. 22 sultans and imams from Marawi also urged Duterte for the resolution of the crisis before the end of Ramadan and told the militants which they say are not Marawinians to leave the besieged city and insist that Islam respects values and respects humanity.

Sheik Abehuraira Abdulrahman Udasan, a mufti, issued a fatwa "against the entry and spread of violent radicalism or extremism" in the Bangsamoro area. This edict was supported by the militant group MILF, which has been assisting the government.

Muslim clerics from a Ulama conference while expressing support for government efforts in regards to the peace process in Mindanao called for an end of air strike by government forces while condemning the acts of the militants as violent extremism and appealed Duterte to appoint a Muslim Justice of the Supreme Court.

==== Social media ====
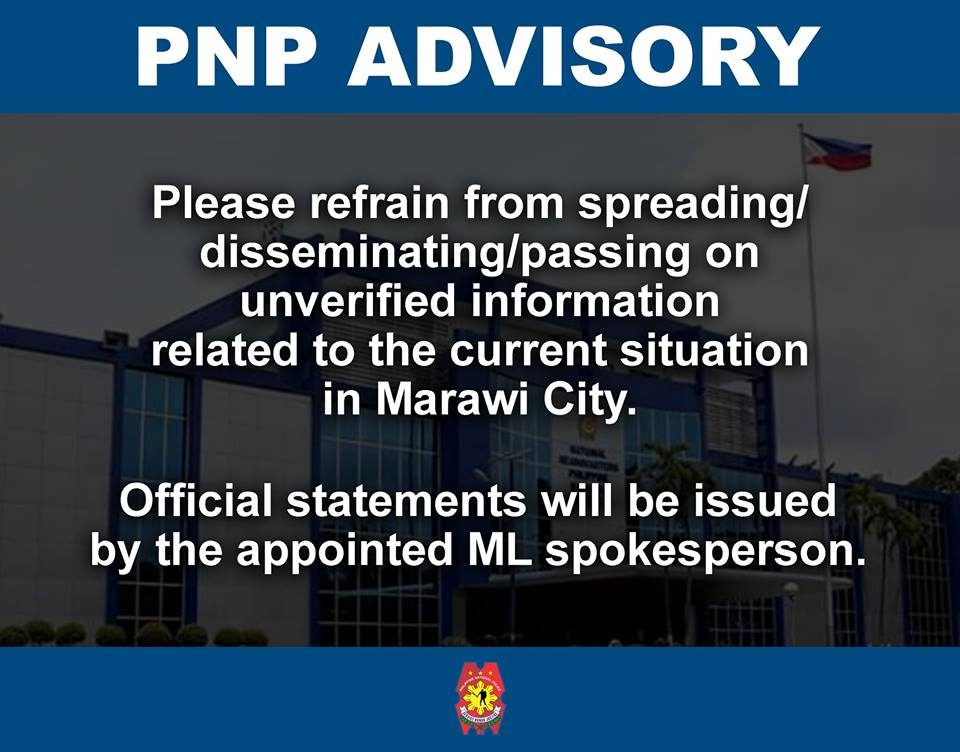
Philippine National Police advisory addressed to the public regarding the dissemination of information in relation to the Marawi crisis

Reactions to the declaration of martial law were mixed on social media. Amidst unconfirmed reports of beheading and kidnapping, PNP spokesman Dionardo Carlos appealed in a press briefing addressed to the public to limit "to what they know what they see" in making posts relevant to the Marawi incident in social media. Numerous Filipino TV personalities have expressed their reactions to the ongoing clash between the government forces and the Maute terror groups in Mindanao. Some Pinoy celebrities also called for unity despite the division in political alliances.

==== Others ====
A group of civilian evacuees who fled from the city organized as the Meranaw Victims Movement (MVM) in September 2017. They have issued statements to the ISIL-linked militants to release the hostages and leave Marawi through a Facebook post or the MVM would be "compelled to face" them. The MVM has also called for the halt of airstrikes on the city as well as the return of evacuated civilians to their homes.

=== International ===
China, Russia, and the United States expressed support for the security efforts of the Philippine Government, with Russian President Vladimir Putin also expressing condolence for the victims of the crisis. Canada has also said that they will extend humanitarian aid upon request of the Philippine government.

Malaysia began to tighten its border with the Philippines shortly after the President announced martial law, while the United Kingdom warned its citizens to avoid traveling to western Mindanao. Saudi Arabia through its embassy in Manila also advised its citizens to avoid public places in the Philippines in general. Malaysian Prime Minister Najib Razak also announced his government's full support to Philippine forces.

Malaysia, the Philippines, and Indonesia launched joint patrols in waters off the Mindanao region to counter threats from Islamic State group militants. Joint sea patrols in the waters bordering the three nations would kick off on June 19, 2017.

Meanwhile, the Indonesian National Armed Forces will also strengthen its outer islands bordering the Philippines by building more military bases to prevent the militant groups from entering Indonesia.

==== Aid ====
===== Military aid =====
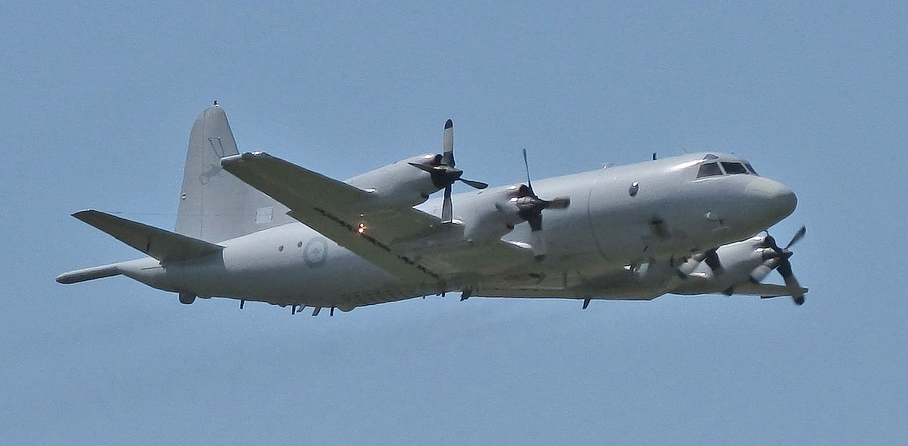
Australia sent AP-3C Orion planes to the southern Philippines following the conflict as surveillance support. The planes started flying over Marawi on June 30 with Filipino pilots and technicians aboard as part of the crew.

The United States provided several deliveries of military equipment. In May 2017, the United States delivered 200 Glock pistols, 300 M4 carbines, 100 grenade launchers, four mini-guns, and individual operator gear worth ₱250 million (US$5 million). Two Cessna 208 surveillance aircraft worth ₱1.6 billion (US$31 million) were delivered to the Philippine Air Force in July, and a Tethered Aerostat Radar System was turned over to the Philippine Navy in August to enhance its maritime surveillance capabilities. A Raven tactical UAV, delivered in January 2017, was also used in Marawi.

On June 23, Australia announced it would provide surveillance support to the Philippines' armed forces by sending two RAAF AP-3C Orion maritime patrol aircraft on flights over the southern Philippines. After the operational details regarding the surveillance support were finalized between the Philippine and Australian military, it was planned that the AP-3C Orion would be immediately deployed in Marawi. In August 2017 the offer was extended further to include the deployment of special forces in a training and advisory role, similar to the role Australian forces play in Iraq. The Philippines accepted the offer in early September 2017 and talks are ongoing to determine the extent of the assistance.

China donated 50 million yuan (Note: About ₱370 million) worth of arms aid which comprises around 3,000 rifles and 6 million pieces of ammunition. Three types of rifles were given: sniper rifles, automatic rifles, and marksman rifles.

Russia also pledged to provide weapons, technical and intelligence aid to the Philippines in response to the attack on Marawi which caused President Rodrigo Duterte's state visit to Russia to end earlier than planned. Russia donated 20 multipurpose vehicles, 5,000 AKM assault rifles, one million rounds of ammunition and 5,000 steel helmets to the Philippines. However, these equipment arrived on October 25, 2017, with the battle in Marawi already concluded.

===== Humanitarian aid =====
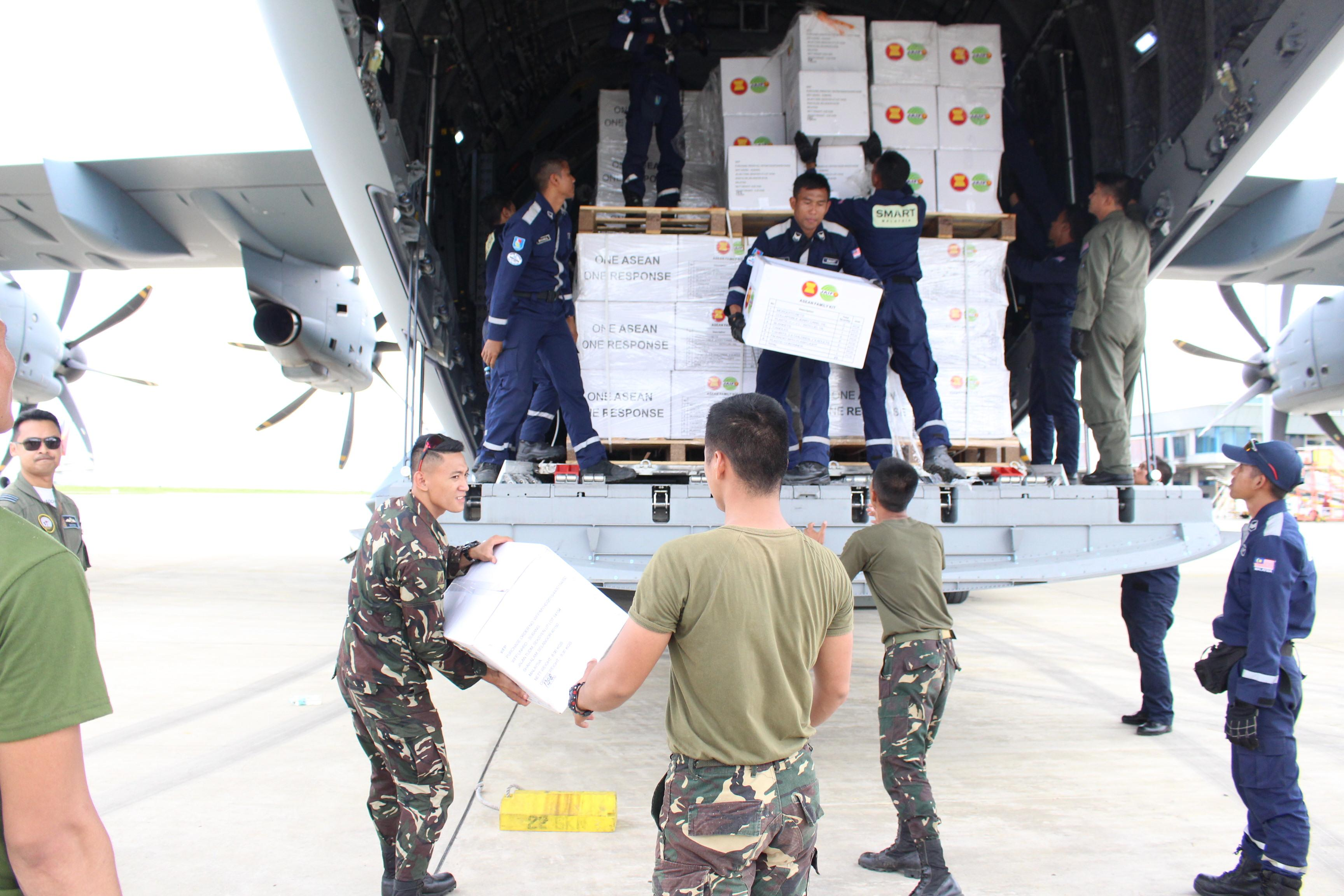
Humanitarian supplies provided by the ASEAN being delivered by plane.

South Korea made donations to the Philippine Red Cross for the organization's efforts in Marawi. The European Union pledged to donate 850 thousand euros (Note: About ₱49 million) worth of humanitarian aid meant for people affected in the conflict.

Turkey through its Turkish Cooperation and Coordination Agency pledged to support to feed displaced Marawi school children studying in temporary learning spaces.

Singapore offered to provide its air force's C-130 to help bring in humanitarian supplies. It also offered to send UAVs to be manned by Singaporean troops to assist the AFP in enhancing surveillance and intelligence capabilities and urban training villages to help the AFP train in urban warfare. Defense Secretary Lorenzana accepted the offer and instructed the AFP to study the Singaporean military's ISR programs. Thailand also offered to deploy troops to Marawi for humanitarian non-combat operations.

On July 6, the Malaysian Armed Forces announced that it was considering sending humanitarian relief for the civilians in Marawi. By July 21, via the country's RMAF A400M, food and medical supplies were sent to the city's internally displaced residents. On July 25, the country promised to send more humanitarian aid as the situation worsened.

Relief effort assistance also came from the United States which totaled ₱730 million (US$15 million). ₱153 million (US$3 million) was allocated for supplies such as drinking water, hygiene kits, evacuation centers shelter materials, and for programs to protect displaced women and children. ₱577 million (US$13 million) was earmarked for the stabilization and rehabilitation of the city and surrounding areas, including restoring basic public services such as health care, water, and electricity.

== In popular culture ==
Child singer Esang de Torres composed her own song entitled "Awit sa Marawi" (lit. '"Song for Marawi"') dedicated for the people in Marawi which serves as a call for peace, love and unity to bring Marawi on its feet. And on October 25, 2017, Esang performed the song live on Wowowin to honor Marawi heroes.

On September 9, 2017, in the episode entitled "Bandila" (lit. '"Flag"') on the anthology series Maalaala Mo Kaya, it aired the life story of Teodoro “Loloy” Dando (played by John Estrada).

On March 10, 2018, in the episode entitled Tangke (lit. '"Tank"') on the anthology series Maalaala Mo Kaya, it aired the life story of army officer Cpt. Rommel Sandoval (played by Zanjoe Marudo) who died during the battle in Marawi last September 10, 2017.

== See also ==
- Battle of Jolo (1974)
- 1995 Ipil massacre
- Battle of Mukalla (2016)
- 2013 Zamboanga siege
- 2016 Butig clash
- Battle of Sirte (2016)
- Battle of Mosul (2016–2017)
- Raqqa campaign (2016–2017)
- Battle of Raqqa (2017)
- 2017 Mayadin offensive
- Battle of Baghuz Fawqani
- Moro conflict
- War on terror
