= Order of Lapulapu =

Philippine order

- Awarded for: invaluable or extraordinary service in relation to a campaign or advocacy of the President
- Country: Philippines
- Presented by: Philippines
- Eligibility: government officials and personnel, and private individuals
- Status: Currently awarded
- Established: April 7, 2017

Precedence
- Next (higher): Presidential Medal of Merit

The Order of Lapulapu (Filipino: Orden ni Lapulapu) is a national order of merit conferred by the President of the Philippines to officials and personnel of the government and private individuals in recognition of invaluable or extraordinary service in relation to a campaign or advocacy of the President. As a presidential award that is not included in the Honors Code of the Philippines, it ranks below the Presidential Medal of Merit.

Pursuant to Section 1 of Executive Order No. 152, s. 2021, references to "Lapu-Lapu" in Executive Order No. 17, s. 2017, as amended, were corrected to "Lapulapu".

== Ranks ==
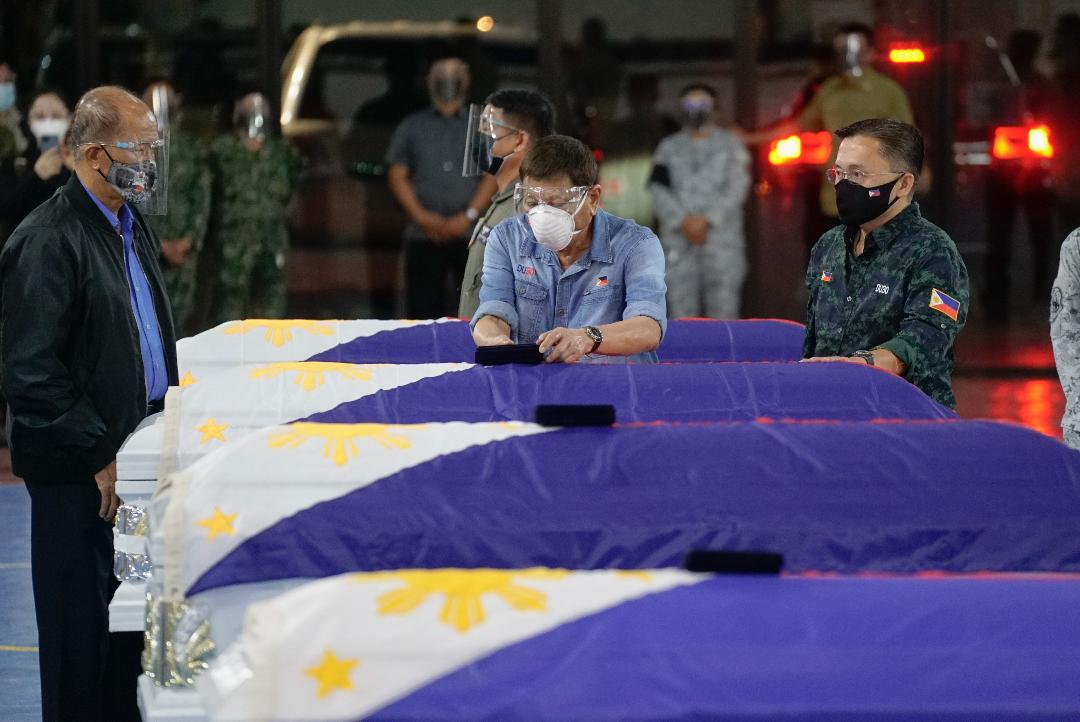
President Rodrigo Duterte, in Zamboanga City on July 5, 2021, lays the Order of Lapulapu with the Rank of Kalasag medal on the coffin of a fallen hero, who died in the C130 plane mishap in Sulu.

Under Executive Order No. 17 (s. 2017), signed by President Rodrigo Duterte, the Order of Lapulapu had three ranks: Lapulapu Medal, Kalasag Medal and Kampilan Medal. This was increased to four under Executive Order No. 35 (s. 2017) as follows:

=== Magalong Medal ===
The Magalong Medal is awarded to officials and personnel of the government and private individuals who have rendered extraordinary service or have made exceptional contributions to the success of an activity pursuant to a campaign or advocacy of the President.

=== Kalasag Medal ===
The Kalasag Medal is awarded to officials and personnel of the government and private individuals who lost their lives as a direct result of their participation in an activity pursuant to a campaign or advocacy of the President.

=== Kampilan Medal ===
The Kampilan Medal is awarded to officials and personnel of the government and private individuals who were seriously wounded or injured or suffered great loss of property as a direct result of their participation in an activity pursuant to a campaign or advocacy of the President.

=== Kamagi Medal ===
The Kamagi Medal is awarded to officials and personnel of the government and private individuals who, not falling under any of the abovementioned ranks, actively participated in and contributed significantly to an activity pursuant to a campaign or advocacy of the President.

== Medal and ribbon ==
The medals of the Order of Lapulapu are manufactured by the Bangko Sentral ng Pilipinas and are made of 99.9% silver with selective gold plating depending on the rank. The ribbon is made of Philippine cotton hand-woven by a cooperative foundation in Bontoc, Mountain Province.

== Recipients ==
Among those who received the order were soldiers killed and injured in a June 2019 Sulu bombing incident; health workers who evacuated patients and newborn babies from the Philippine General Hospital amid a fire in the facility; a number of athletes who participated in the 31st Southeast Asian Games; 767 policemen who assisted in the 2017 Battle of Marawi; and 80 soldiers involved in the June 2024 clash with the Chinese Coast Guard in the West Philippine Sea. Businessman Jose Kho, a Chinese national, also received the order's Kamagi medal in 2017.
