= Francisco Camacho =

Francisco Camacho may refer to:

- Francisco Javier Camacho (born 1964), Mexican boxer
- Francisco Camacho Sr. (1924–1955), Philippine soldier
- Francisco Gómez Camacho (1939–2024), Spanish Jesuit priest and academic
