= Emigdio =

Emigdio is a given name. Notable people with the name include:

- Emigdio Ayala Báez (1917–1993), Paraguayan musician
- Óscar Emigdio Benítez (born 1948), former El Salvador football player and manager
- Emigdio Flores Calpiñeiro (born 1950), Bolivian politician and sociologist
- Emigdio C. Cruz, Philippine Army officer, received the Philippines' highest military award for courage, the Medal of Valor
- Elías Emigdio (born 1991), Mexican boxer
- Alcides Emigdio Lanza (born 1929), Canadian composer, conductor, pianist, and music educator of Argentinian birth
- Luis Emigdio Vega Torres (born 1998), Cuban swimmer
- Emigdio Vasquez (1939–2014), Chicano-American artist, social realist muralist and educator

== See also ==
- San Emigdio Creek, a 33 km northward-flowing stream in western Kern County, central California
- San Emigdio, municipality in the La Paz department of El Salvador
- San Emigdio blue, Plebejus emigdionis in the family of butterflies known as Lycaenidae
- San Emigdio Formation, geologic formation in California
- San Emigdio Mountain, in the San Emigdio Mountains
- San Emigdio Mountains, part of the Transverse Ranges in Southern California
- Emigi
