= Leopoldo Diokno =

- Military career
- Allegiance: Philippines
- Branch: Philippine Army
- Rank: Staff Sergeant
- Service number: 780681
- Unit: 1st Scout Ranger Regiment
- Conflicts: Moro conflict
- Awards: Medal of Valor

Leopoldo Diokno is a retired Philippine Army enlisted trooper and a recipient the Philippines' highest military award for courage, the Medal of Valor.

Sergeant Diokno was part of the military operation led by Lieutenant Colonel Noel S. Buan that neutralized Abu Sayyaf sub-leader Hamsiraji Marusi Sali on 8 April 2004. Buan, commanding the 1st Scout Ranger Battalion in Basilan, Philippines, and his men figured in a firefight with Sali and six others, including Sali's younger brother Sahir, also called Yashier Sali. Hamsiraji Sali was implicated in the kidnapping of American Jeffrey Schilling, the 2001 Dos Palmas kidnappings, and had a $1M bounty on his head. All six Abu Sayyaf members were killed. Buan's troops suffered one killed and four wounded, including Buan himself.

Buan and Diokno were awarded Gold Cross medals, which were later upgraded to Distinguished Conduct Stars. In what would prove to be a controversial move, these medals were later further upgraded to the Medal of Valor, which was approved by then-Philippine President Gloria Macapagal Arroyo.

== Medal of Valor citation ==
STAFF SERGEANT LEOPOLDO C DIOKNO JR 780681

Basilan Province- 4 August 2004

"For acts of conspicuous courage, gallantry and intrepidity at the risk of life above and beyond the call of duty during a one hour and a half-encounter against undetermined number of Abu Sayyaff terrorists under Commander HAMSIRAJI SALI at Barangay Makiri in Lantawan, Basilan Province on 08 April 2004. While serving as team member and one of the assaulting elements of the First Scout Ranger Battalion, First scout Ranger Regiment, Special Operations Command, Philippine Army under LIEUTENANT COLONEL BUAN. He helped carry out an entrapment operation to pin down and neutralize Commander Hamsiraji Sali. On or about 081120 April 2004, STAFF SERGEANT DIOKNO JR together with LTC BUAN and the rest of the team arrived in the area where they were supposed to meet SALI and his group. The team noticed that the Abu Sayyaf elements have already positioned themselves near the house of HAKIM AMPING, one of Sali’s officers. The government troops greeted and shook hands with the ASG members. Shortly thereafter, LTC BUAN alerted his men and STAFF SERGEANT DIOKNO JR took a defensive stance after the former sensed the unfriendly intents of Sali and his men. While trying to stop Sali from firing his gun, Sali was able to squeeze the trigger of his M16 rifle and hit the left arm of STAFF SERGEANT DIOKNO JR. Unmindful of this wound and personal safety, he grabbed Sali by the neck and wrestled him until he managed to fire his pistol at Sali. At the scene of the encounter, the team recovered seven neutralized terrorists, including the notorious Sali brothers, six caliber 5.56 mm M16 rifles, two 40mm grenade launchers, one 12-gauge shotgun, three rounds of ammunition for 40mm grenade launcher, hundreds of rounds of ammunition for M16 rifle, seven bandoleers, four combat packs with personal effects and subversive documents. By these gallant deeds, STAFF SERGEANT DIOKNO JR distinguished himself in combat, in keeping with the finest traditions of Filipino soldiery."
