= Buan =

Buan may refer to:

== People ==
- Noel S. Buan, Philippine army officer

== Places ==
- Buan County, South Korea
- Buan, Gwynedd, United Kingdom
- San Jose de Buan, Philippines

== Other ==
- Botswana University of Agriculture and Natural Resources
- Buan language of Arnhem Land, Australia
