= Armed Forces of the Philippines Medal of Valor =

Highest award in the Philippine military for bravery

Medal of Valor
- The AFP Medal of Valor, in its entirety
- Type: Neck order
- Awarded for: Conspicuous gallantry and intrepidity at the risk of life above and beyond the call of duty
- Presented by: the Republic of the Philippines
- Eligibility: members of the Armed Forces of the Philippines
- Status: Currently awarded
- Established: ca. 1901-1902 (as a Philippine Constabulary decoration); 1935 (as an AFP decoration)
- First award: 1902 (PC); 1935 (AFP)
- Final award: 2024

Highlights
- Total: 41
- Total awarded posthumously: 18
- Total recipients: 41
- Service Ribbon

Precedence
- Next (lower): Distinguished Conduct Star
- Related: Medal of Honor

The Medal of Valor (MOV) (Filipino: Medalya ng Kagitingan) is the Armed Forces of the Philippines' highest military decoration awarded for bravery.

The medal is awarded by the President of the Philippines, by approval of the highest officials in the AFP, to members of the Armed Forces of the Philippines, including recognized guerrilla forces. The award is held in such high regard that the President is required to render a salute to the medal, and to the individual wearing it.

== History ==
The MOV was institutionalized as the highest award of the gendarmerie force in American-occupied Philippines, the Philippine Constabulary, though the exact date of its institution has not been confirmed. Although in 1902, Military Governor Adna Chaffee, and later Governor-General Luke Edward Wright authorized the conferment of the MOV "for extraordinary exploits" of constables, fighting outlaws and bandits in the countryside, as well as rebellious Moro tribesmen.

Given the small number of medals awarded while directly under American control, the MOV is considered as one of the rarest awards authorized by the United States to be worn by American personnel who were part of the PC.

During the Commonwealth era, the MOV was later made as the highest award of the newly established Armed Forces of the Philippines, under the National Defense Act of 1935, which consisted of members reassigned from the PC, and the American-trained Philippine Scouts.

== Requirements ==
The MOV is foremost in the order of precedence of awards and decorations of the Armed Forces of the Philippines. It is defined in the Philippine Army Awards and Decorations Reference Material FC 1–0062, itself adapted from the AFP Awards and Decorations Handbook (1997), as an award for "heroism in combat", demanding "actual conflict with armed enemies".

To justify the conferment of the MOV, an officer or enlisted personnel must "perform an action/deed of personal bravery of self-sacrifice above and beyond the call of duty as conspicuous as to distinguish themselves above their comrades".

The action/deed in question must involve the risk of life, meaning that a complete and utter disregard for the personal safety of the recipient must be proven. It must be understood that no one among the unit in which the recipient is attached to would have normally done the act being cited for the award. Moreover, the recipient should have acted on his own volition/initiative, and that no one, even their commanding officer, have handed them specific orders to do the act being cited for the award.

If a soldier wishes to recommend another soldier of the MOV, the deed should subject the latter to any justified criticism, and the act "directly affect the outcome of the armed engagement" (i.e. made acceptable within the parameters of honorable combat, even if the members of the unit which the recipient is attached to surrendered or retreated without orders, and the recipient has done all that the honor of war requires).

The MOV shall be awarded only for one, and the same act of heroism displayed in a single period of time, thus can only recommended once. The same act cannot be used as basis for another recommendation (i.e. to be awarded two MOVs for the same act). Such is tantamount to grounds to having the MOV revoked.

Pertinent documents are required to prove that a potential recipient of the MOV is worthy of conferment. Anyone who wishes to recommend someone of the award must provide a narrative report including:

- the terrain and weather of the area in which the action took place (made through a sketch),
- enemy condition (including morale, proximity, firepower, casualties, and situations prior, during, and after the action of the enemy), and
- the actions of the recipient's comrades in the immediate vicinity of the act, and the degree of their participation in the act involving the recipient (so as to make them stand out from the rest)
- affidavits from two or more witnesses (probably from the same unit the recipient is attached to) may be required to confirm any information from the narrative report

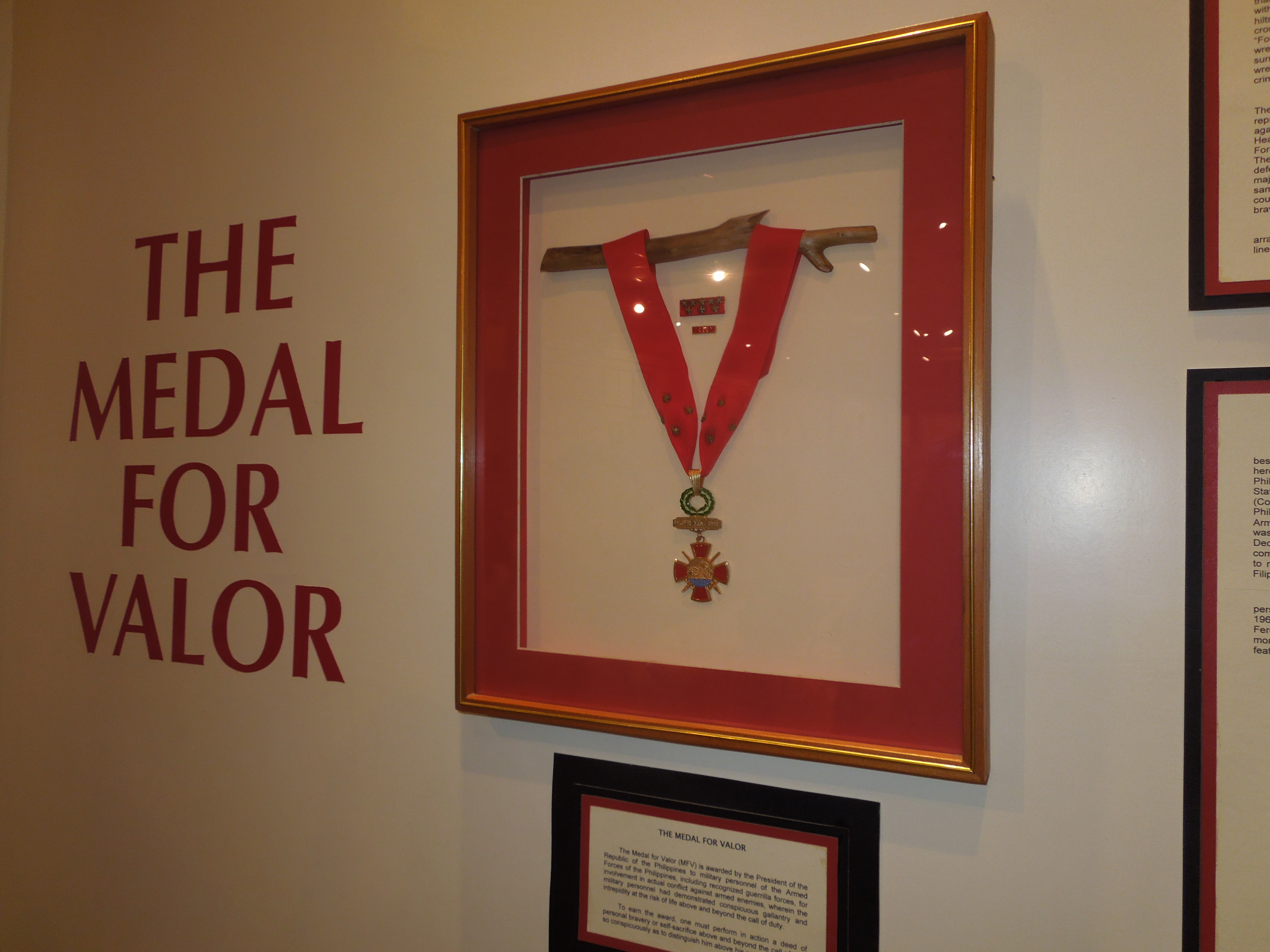
A wall display for the highest award for bravery of the Armed Forces of the Philippines, inside the AFP Museum, Camp Aguinaldo, Quezon City. In military nomenclature, the award is referred to as the Medal for Valor.

=== Nomenclature Dispute ===
The phrase For Valor embossed on the bar suspended from the medal has led some sources to call the award as the Medal For Valor (MFV; Filipino: Medalya para sa Kagitingan); such is how the Philippine Army, and the rest of the AFP establishment refers to it. However, other official Philippine government sources refer to it as the Medal of Valor, which the general public has accustomed to calling it ever since. This may be attributed to the similarity of the nomenclature of the award with its American counterpart, which is officially referred to as the Medal of Honor.

=== Medal of Valor Awards and Decorations Board ===
The Medal of Valor Awards and Decorations Board, or simply the MOV Board, is the oversight board of the AFP that deliberates recommendations of MOV awards as endorsed by a prior body, the AFP Awards and Decorations Board, to ensure propriety, fitness, and attain the well-being intent of the award. The Board, in the execution of its responsibility, shall preserve the true significance and highlight the value of the MOV as an award.

The Board is composed of:

- the Vice Chief of Staff of the Armed Forces of the Philippines (as Chairperson),
- the Chairman of the AFP Awards and Decorations Board (Assistant J1) (as Vice Chairperson), and
- Members that comprise of:
  - at least two MOV recipients in active service (regardless of branch of service),
  - Executive Officers of J-Staff,
  - Chief, Morale and Welfare Division (OJ-1),
  - the AFP Sergeant Major, and
  - Chief, Morale and Discipline Division, Office of The Adjutant General (OTAG) (as Secretary)

The Secretary of the MOV Board is the one in charge of undertaking the initial screening and processing of recommendations and shall schedule Board deliberations thereof. The Secretary also:

- ensures the completeness of the documents and appropriateness of the recommendation,
- prepares the minutes of Board deliberations and resolutions for the Board members' approval,
- collate all pertinent documents warranting the recommendation of the recipient with the conferment of the MOV, and
- transmits the recommendations of the Chairman to the AFP Board of Generals for final deliberation through the Deputy of Staff for Personnel, J1; such recommendations made by the MOV Board must receive no other than "unanimous approval" with no margin of doubt or any possibility of error.

=== Endorsement, and Approval of MOV Recommendations ===
The recommendation of the MOV Board for a potential recipient of the award is then transmitted to the AFP Board of Generals, a separate and higher oversight body who reviews and confirms said recommendation to obtain their approval "with unanimous recognition" as to the nobility and dignity of the deed/s warranting the award.

The recommendation is then transmitted to the Deputy Chief of Staff for Personnel, J1, for preparation for its packaging (including minutes of the meeting of the Board of Generals deliberations) for endorsement to the President, through the Secretary of National Defense, as well as the Chief of Staff of the Armed Forces of the Philippines (CSAFP).

The CSAFP (as Chairman of the AFP Board of Generals) then approves the recommendation of the endorsement to the President through the Secretary of National Defense. Once approved, the OTAG shall now produce General Orders for the conferment of the MOV and distribute copies of said GOs to the Adjutants of the Army, the Navy, and the Air Force.

==== Disapproved MOV Recommendations ====
In the case that an MOV recommendation is disapproved by the CSAFP, it shall be sent back to the concerned board (either the AFP Awards and Decorations Board, the MOV Board, or the Board of Generals) for re-deliberation or possible downgrading of the award (e.g. Distinguished Conduct Star, the Philippine Legion of Honor, or the Gold Cross). A new, revised recommendation shall be resubmitted if new, substantive, and material information is provided within the limits prescribed. The information forming the basis must have been unknown prior to resubmission and must not have been considered by the recommending and disapproving board officials/members.

== Appearance ==
=== Medal Design History ===
Throughout its history, the MOV has undergone four confirmed design changes, first as an award for the Constabulary during the Insular era, and later for the AFP, both in the Commonwealth, and the Republic eras.

==== First Version (1901, Insular era) ====
The first incarnation of the award (created in 1901) took the form of a gold-plated bronze bar, oval and undulating, measuring two inches long. The bar bore the phrase "FOR VALOR", and a monogram of the PC inside a shield at the bottom. The reverse contained the name of the recipient, the place of action, and the date of achievement warranting the conferment of the award. A certificate was also awarded for each recipient. These bars were manufactured by the medal making firm of Luis Zamora.

==== Second Version (1918; Insular era) ====
The second incarnation was created as per Philippine Constabulary General Order 9, in 1918. It saw the same gold-plated bronze bar of the first version now hanging from a 1.5-inch-wide crimson red ribbon. The ribbon has 13 gold stars arranged in a 2-5-6 formation, symbolizing the 13 United States that first revolted against the British (as the Philippines was an American colony at the time, the majority of Filipino military heraldry were borrowed from the Americans). As per PC General Order 11, also in 1918, those who received the first version of the MOV were authorized to have them replaced with this version. A miniature gold bar with a five-pointed star was appurtenant to the ribbon for every succeeding award to the same recipient, such is the case of a particular Constable Malaco, who won his first MOV in 1907 (as a Corporal), and the second in 1911 (as a First Sergeant).

==== Third Version (1923; Insular era) ====
The third version saw the transformation of the MOV from a mere clasp into an actual medal. It now featured a Maltese cross resting on a laurel wreath. In the middle of the cross is the American bald eagle resting on a four-pointed star and clutching a scroll with the phrase "FOR VALOR". On the horizontal arms (i.e. flanges) of the cross, a star is placed on both sides; the top vertical arm featured the coat of arms of the Insular government, while the bottom vertical arm featured the PC monogram (reminiscent of the first version). The service ribbon saw the arrangement of the 13 stars change into a 6-4-3 formation, forming an inverted triangle. The medals for this version were manufactured by the firm of Filipino metalsmith and sculptor Crispulo Zamora (1871-1922).

All previous incarnations of the MOV were worn on the left breast of the recipient's dress uniform.

==== Fourth Version (1937; Commonwealth era) ====
A fourth version of the medal is described by Filipino military historian Major Emanuel Agrava Baja, in his book The Medal for Valor, The Distinguished Conduct Star, The Distinguished Service Star, Special Awards and Medals, published in 1937. The version in contention consists of the same elements of the third version, albeit with a few design changes: the coat of arms of the Insular government has been replaced with the Commonwealth coat of arms at the top vertical arm of the same Maltese cross as the third version. The PC monogram at the bottom vertical arm of the cross is then replaced with a "P.A." monogram (symbolizing the Philippine Army, of the newly created Armed Forces of the Philippines); these were minted by the firm of Bailey Banks, and Biddle, in the United States. It is initially believed by numismatists and subject matter experts that this fourth version never existed (as physical copies of the decoration were ultimately rare), but a photograph of General Jonathan Wainwright being awarded such version in 1947 exists; his medal, being awarded to Wainwright by Philippine Ambassador to the United States Joaquin Elizalde, is suspended from the same crimson red ribbon seen in the third version, with a different arrangement of the 13 stars (1-2-3-2-3-2 formation), and in turn, is hanging from a separate crimson red ribbon necklet.

This version is the one also awarded to American General Douglas MacArthur, Admiral Chester W. Nimitz, Commander Charles "Chick" Parsons, Jr., and Filipino Major Emigdio Cruz.

==== Fifth Version (1946; Republic era) ====
===== Obverse =====
The medal, in its fifth and current version, is composed of a gold-plated bronze disc adorned with a golden sea-lion in relief holding an eight-rayed sun (similar to what is used in the Philippine flag), and resting on water waves composed of five blue ripples, in enamel. The disk rests on a red cross with golden borders; two golden crossed swords are sandwiched between the disk and the cross, with the hilts (i.e. handles) emerging at the bottom, and the blades on top. The top-most arm (i.e. flange) of the cross contains three golden stars in a triangular pattern.

A golden bar embossed with the phrase "FOR VALOR" connects the medal to a sampaguita wreath consisting of ten white buds and twenty-two green leaves. The wreath serves as a link to a crimson red ribbon necklet, which is appurtenant with eight golden stars, equally divided into two on each side of the necklet, four to the left, and another four to the right.

===== Reverse =====
The golden bar in which the words "FOR VALOR" is written in obverse contains the phrase "THE PRESIDENT" in reverse, while the top arm of the cross contains the word (i.e. preposition) "TO". The rest of the medal, in turn, is plain, with the center of the disc reserved for the name of the recipient to be engraved.

In effect, the medal shall bear the phrase "THE PRESIDENT TO (NAME OF RECIPIENT [including the rank, and the branch of service])", when the engravings are read from top to bottom.

All MOVs from 1949 up to the 1980s were made by El Oro, a government-accredited Pasig-based medal maker and engraver founded by Jose Tupaz, Jr. The maker marks are usually stamped/debossed at the bottom arm of the cross.

===== Symbolism and Significance =====
Sealion - the awarding authority (i.e. the President of the Philippines)

Eight-rayed sun - the eight provinces of the Philippines that revolted against Spain during the Revolution of 1896

Five blue ripples - the entire establishment of the AFP (the GHQ, the Army, the Navy, the Air Force, and the Marine Corps)

Crossed swords - conflict with an enemy in the defense of the nation

Three stars - the three major island groups of the Philippines

Sampaguita wreath - the highest honor for courage and gallantry displayed in the achievement of such meritorious act warranting the MOV

Red - bravery

White - sincerity on the performance of duty

Green - nobility to service

===== Service Ribbon =====
The service ribbon, worn in lieu of the medal itself, is similarly colored crimson (as the color of the ribbon necklet) with eight golden stars arranged horizontally forming two parallel lines, five stars on the top line and three on the bottom.

The service ribbon for the previous versions of the MOV (Insular, and Commonwealth eras) contained five white stars.

===== Appurtenances =====
Every subsequent award of the MOV to an individual shall be appurtenant with an Anahaw Leaf, and is awarded as follows:

- Bronze Anahaw Leaf - for the first, second, third, and fourth succeeding award
- Silver Anahaw Leaf - for every fifth succeeding Bronze Anahaw Leaf
- Gold Anahaw Leaf - for every fifth Silver Anahaw Leaf

These devices are to be worn on the MOV's ribbon bar in dress uniforms, with the tips of the leaf pointed upward.

Given the current nature as to how the MOV is to be conferred upon eligible military personnel, there has been no record of anyone receiving two or more awards (in the current version), thus making the application of such appurtenance senseless, and quite impossible to achieve.

== Recipient's privileges ==
The following privileges are in conformity to Republic Act 9049, approved in 2001.

=== Gratuity Pay ===
The MOV recipient is entitled to a lifetime monthly gratuity pay of twenty-thousand Philippine pesos (₱20,000), which is separate and distinct from any salary (if still active) or pension (if already retired) they are receiving, or will receive from the government. Such gratuity pay is tax-free, under Republic Act 8424 (The Tax Reform Act of 1997).

For posthumous awards, the gratuity pay shall be accrued in equal shares, and given to:

- the surviving spouse (i.e. wife) until she remarries, and/or
- all the children of the recipient (legitimate, adopted, or illegitimate/non-marital), until they all reach the age of 18, or until they all marry, whichever comes first

The President, upon joint recommendation of the CSAFP, the SND, and the Secretary of Budget and Management, may be allowed to adjust the rate of gratuity pay of the recipients, taking into consideration the economic and social factors such as inflation rate, although they cannot do such adjustment within five years after the last adjustment. The latest adjustment to the MOV gratuity pay was made in 2016 by former President Rodrigo Duterte, raising the amount to ₱75,000.

=== Preferential Treatments ===
In addition to financial incentives, the MOV recipient, their spouse, and their dependents are given the following preferential treatments:

- precedence in employment opportunities in government agencies, or government owned-and-controlled corporations (GOCCs), provided that the recipient or their dependent/s do meet the job qualifications/requirements;
- priority in the approval of housing applications under existing housing programs of the government;
- priority in acquisition of public lands under Commonwealth Act 141 (The Public Land Act of 1936), and preferential rights in the lease of pasture lands and exploitation of natural resources;
- privilege in obtaining loans in an aggregate not exceeding to five hundred thousand Philippine pesos (₱500,000) from government-owned-and controlled financial institutions, without having to put up any collateral, or constitute any pledge/mortgage to secure the payment of the loan;
- 20% discount from all establishments (such as hotels/similar lodging establishments, restaurants, recreation and sports centers), all transportation services, and purchases of medicines (provided that private establishments may claim the cost as tax credits);
- 20% discount from admission fees charged by theaters, cinema houses and concert halls, circuses, carnivals, and any other similar places of culture, leisure, and amusement (provided that private establishments may claim the cost as tax credits);
- free medical and dental services and consultations in hospitals and clinics throughout the country, public and private (provided that private hospitals and clinic may claim the cost of services as tax credits);
- exemption of payment of tuition/matriculation fees in public and private schools, universities, colleges, and other educational institutions in any undergraduate, baccalaureate, and post-graduate programs (notwithstanding the limitations imposed by Presidential Decree 577, which provides scholarship programs for dependents of any AFP personnel killed/incapacitated in the line of duty, MOV recipient or otherwise);
- priority for commission for children of the recipient who wish to attend the Philippine Military Academy upon graduation (including call to active duty, and enlistment to the regular force), provided that the dependent is qualified;

Government entities or private companies who deny the recipient these privileges are penalized with up to six years imprisonment, and a fine not exceeding ₱300,000. If the person who refused to give such privileges to the MOV recipient (and/or their dependents) is a public official, they will be perpetually disqualified to hold public office and lose their pension in the process.

== List of recipients ==
Since its institution in 1935 (as an AFP award), there have been 41 MOV recipients. Of these recipients, 17 are living. As of 2026, only one remains in active service: Herbert Dilag.

The portraits of MOV recipients are displayed in the Hall of Heroes at Camp General Emilio Aguinaldo, General Headquarters of the Armed Forces of the Philippines in Quezon City.

The Hall of Valor at the Philippine Military Academy also showcases the portraits of MOV recipients who graduated from the Academy.

=== Philippine Army ===
Image	Name	Rank	Place and date of action	Unit	Year awarded	Status	Notes
	Paulino Santos	Major General	Bayang Cotta, Lanao del Sur; 26 July 1917	Philippine Constabulary	1935	Deceased	"He and his men engaged its defenders in a bloody hand-to-hand combat, killing 30 of them, and thus preserving the lives of government soldiers." "In this gallant act, one PC soldier was killed while five others were wounded. Lieutenant Santos sustained a near-fatal gunshot (wound) at the back of the head."
	Emigdio C. Cruz	Lieutenant Colonel	Japanese-occupied Philippines; 3 May 1943 to 28 February 1944	Philippine Commonwealth Army, in active service in the United States Army	1944	Deceased	"Major Cruz volunteered for the hazardous mission of entering the Philippines and obtaining information there of the great importance to the Government of the Commonwealth and the Southwest Pacific Command. His capture by the enemy would have meant torture and certain death."
	Mariano Castañeda	Major General	Plaza Miranda, Manila; 10 March 1947	Philippine Constabulary	1950	Deceased	"His presence of mind and display of exemplary courage and bravery in the timely disposal of the lethal grenade saved the life of the First President of the Philippines (Manuel Roxas) and those of his family and other higher ranking officials of the Republic, who at that moment, were all with him on the platform."
	Conrado Yap	Captain	Yeoncheon County, South Korea (Battle of Yultong); 22-23 April 1951	10th Battalion Combat Team, Philippine Expeditionary Forces to Korea	1951	Killed in action	"He succeeded in recovering the body of Lieutenant Artiaga and that of three (3) other enlisted men when not being satisfied with this and acting above and beyond the call of duty, he proceeded to assault an enemy emplacement about 300 yards away despite the hail of enemy fires until he fell dead from an enemy bullet."
Francisco Camacho Sr	Francisco Camacho Sr.	Master Sergeant	Calauan, Laguna; 20 December 1955	1st Scout Ranger Regiment	1955	Died of wounds	"... awarded the Medal of Valor after a successful combat mission behind enemy lines which killed a notorious Hukbalahap leader." "At a pre-arranged signal they immediately opened fire on the Huks and, with concentrated fire, they were able to kill Commander Villapando, Commander Gueverra and one Huk bodyguard. One of the Huks shot back, hitting Master Sergeant Camacho, who died soon afterwards."
—	Weene Martillana	Corporal	Calauan, Laguna; 20 December 1955	1st Scout Ranger Regiment	1955	Deceased	"... awarded the Medal of Valor after a successful combat mission behind enemy lines which killed a notorious Hukbalahap leader." "Master Sergeant Camacho together with Corporal Martillana, ... posed as civilians and befriended Eddie Villapando, notorious Huk Commander who terrorized Cavite and Batangas for many years. With Master Sergeant Camacho as leader, these enlisted men, after establishing contact with Villapando in September 1955, skillfully and at great risk to themselves, won the confidence of Villapando and his bodyguards."
Ferdinand Marcos	Ferdinand Marcos	Third Lieutenant	Bataan; 22-26 January 1942	United States Army Forces in the Far East	1958	Deceased	Marcos had claimed to be the recipient of 300 war medals, a controversial claim due to his contentious war history. The official reason given for Marcos' conferment of the Medal of Valor was reportedly for his: "... prevention of the possible decimation of withdrawing USAFFE troops in a 'suicidal action against overwhelming enemy forces', thus helping delay the inevitable fall of Bataan."
—	Miguel Pastolero	Staff Sergeant	Libacao, Capiz; 26 October 1951	Military Intelligence Service	1964	Killed in action	"Staff Sergeant Pastolero was able to empty his magazine before he expired and in his dying moments accounted for eight (8) HMBs out of the twenty two (22) dissidents killed during the melee. His coolness under fire, his indomitable courage, his fortitude and his fighting spirit are in keeping with the highest traditions of the Armed Forces of the Philippines."
—	Bienvenido Fajemolin	Corporal	Sibuco, Zamboanga del Norte; 18 October 1977	3rd Platoon, Charlie Company, 36th Infantry Battalion, 4th Infantry Division	1980	Living	"Although wounded, he rallied the demoralized and badly hit group defending the headquarters, reorganized the defensive positions, and evacuated the wounded and the dead to safe areas. He held the attack for five hours until the insurgents disengaged and withdrew from the scene, with 16 killed and 10 Garand rifles and one 12-gauge shotgun lost."
—	Hilario Estrella	First Lieutenant	Bayog, Zamboanga del Sur; 1 December 1984	Charlie Company, 33rd Infantry Battalion, 1st Infantry Division	1987	Living	"Unfazed, First Lieutenant Estrella rallied his men and the fierce fire-fight lasted seven hours until the terrorists withdrew. At the scene of the encounter, they recovered 22 bodies of dead terrorists, including 3 commanders, 12 high-powered firearms, assorted ammunition and subversive documents."
—	Francisco Granfil	Sergeant	Tarragona, Davao Oriental; 12 February 1988	Operational Team 1103, 11th Special Forces Company, Home Defense Group (Airborne)	1989	Living	"Despite his sensing the advance of the reinforcing rebels coming from the main body, he steadfastly stood his ground and fiercely fought with automatic fires and grenade launchers, while interchangeably operating the 60 millimeter mortar until the enemy withdrew, leaving behind 37 terrorists killed and several others wounded. This conspicuous and heroic act of Sergeant Granfil prevented the complete annihilation of the beleaguered troops, the saving of many lives and prevented the loss of government properties."
—	Robert Salvador	Private First Class	Camp Aguinaldo, Quezon City; 3 December 1989	—	1990	Living	Salvador was one of the soldiers defending Camp Aguinaldo during the 1989 Philippine coup attempt. When rebel armored personnel carriers rammed the camp's gate, Salvador fired on the vehicles with a 90mm recoilless rifle, killing several crewmen inside. One of those killed turned out to be Salvador's brother, Rogelio.
	Arturo B. Ortiz	Captain	Murcia, Negros Occidental; 6 April 1990	606th Special Forces Company	1990	Living	"The two-hour gun battle resulted in 84 terrorists killed with 22 dead bodies counted, including 17 recovered on site, 8 captured, and several others wounded and missing as reported by the Negros Regional Party Committee."
—	Bartolome Vicente Bacarro	Second Lieutenant	Isabela; 1991	6th CAFGU Active Auxiliary Company, 21st Infantry Battalion	1991	Living	"He executed a systematic attack through proper maneuvers and strict adherence to fire discipline by firing only at sure enemy targets to conserve their ammunition and spare the civilians from being caught in the crossfire."
—	Romualdo Rubi	Corporal	Claver, Surigao del Norte; 18 March 1991	1st Scout Ranger Regiment	1991	Deceased	Rubi single-handedly fought 100 New People's Army guerrillas, killing 26 after a three-hour firefight. He was armed with an M16 rifle with about 200 rounds of ammunition and two grenades.
—	Jose Bandong Jr.	Second Lieutenant	Mountain Province; 10 April 1992	24th Infantry Battalion	1992	Killed in action	Bandong's platoon was overwhelmed by New People's Army guerrillas during a 9-hour firefight. Volunteering to stay behind while his men withdrew, Bandong's last call was for artillery to "Fire on my location." "By this display of heroism Second Lieutenant Jose Bandong Jr upheld the highest virtue of military leadership and professionalism, thus earning distinct credit for himself and the Armed Forces of the Philippines."
—	Roy Cuenca	Staff Sergeant	Tandag, Surigao del Sur; 20 October 1991	CAFGU Active Auxiliary Salvacion Patrol Base, Headquarters and Headquarters Company, 29th Infantry Battalion, 4th Infantry Division	1992	Living	"With his valiant and resolute chivalry and unnerving audacity, Staff Sergeant Cuenca repeatedly repulsed and subdued the enemy's continued attempts to overrun their detachment. Although outnumbered, Staff Sergeant Cuenca was able to hold his ground for almost three hours of heavy firefight with the enemy."
—	Cirilito Sobejana	Captain	Isabela, Basilan; 13 January 1995	1st Scout Ranger Regiment	1996	Living	"He repeatedly maneuvered around, exposing himself to enemy fire to direct the battle and operate the radio."
—	Robert Edward Lucero	Captain	Carmen, Cotabato; 1996	6th Scout Ranger Company	2000	Killed in action	"While defending the government's infrastructure project in the area, Lucero paid the ultimate sacrifice but showed the finest traditions of Filipino soldiery."
—	Herbert Dilag	Second Lieutenant	Basilan; 30 April 2000	1st Scout Ranger Battalion	2000	Living	"Uncertain of what will happen to them, the members of the Squads, left their valuables to their supporting comrades to be further given to their loved ones, in anticipation of their deaths."
—	Claudio Forrosuelo	Sergeant	Matanog, Maguindanao; 3 May 2000	8th Scout Ranger Company, 2nd Scout Ranger Battalion	2000	Killed in action	Forrosuelo volunteered to stay behind as a delaying force, inspiring five other soldiers to do the same in an act of self-sacrifice to allow the rest of his unit to re-position at a more advantageous location after being engaged in a firefight with 500-600 members of the Moro Islamic Liberation Front that lasted four hours.
—	Lucio Curig	Staff Sergeant	Basilan; 30 April 2000	1st Scout Ranger Battalion	2000	Living	Curig was awarded for his actions in the same operation in which his CO Herbert Dilag received his. "SSgt Curig and 13 other Rangers volunteered for and organized a "suicide squad" to execute the final assault. Thoroughly exhausted yet unmindful of losing their lives, they rushed towards the enemy's fortified defenses and carried out an intense bunker-to-bunker close (quarter) battle."
Noel S. Buan	Noel S. Buan	Lieutenant Colonel	Lantawan, Basilan; 8 April 2004	1st Scout Ranger Battalion	2004	Living	"With boldness, innovative guerrilla techniques, and a resolve to accomplish the mission, he and his men were able to close in, and dealt with the enemies face to face. "... showed unfaltering will power which inspired his men to fight aggressively, eventually resulting in the successful neutralization of 7 terrorists."
—	Leopoldo Diokno	Staff Sergeant	Basilan; 8 April 2004	1st Scout Ranger Battalion	2004	Living	"Diokno assisted Noel Buan in planning the operation against the Abu Sayyaf ... voluntarily risked his life above and beyond the call of duty by allowing himself to become part of the entrapment operation to accomplish the neutralization of Hamsiraji Sali and his group."
	Ian Pacquit	Private First Class	Zamboanga City; 24 September 2013	3rd Scout Ranger Company	2014	Killed in action	"With the courage, dedication and sacrifice of Private First Class Ian Pacquit, further casualties were avoided and the neutralization of enemy firing positions greatly contributed to the clearing and capture of enemy strongholds."
	Rommel Sandoval	Captain	Marawi City; 10 September 2017	11th Scout Ranger Company	2017	Killed in action	"Cpt. Sandoval distinguished himself in combat as he displayed extraordinary courage, bravery, sterling leadership and professionalism by offering the greatest sacrifice of giving his life to a fellow comrade, thereby keeping with the finest tradition of the Filipino soldiery."
	Dhell Jhun Evangelista	First Lieutenant	Tipo-Tipo, Basilan August 12, 2009	1st Light Reaction Company	2024	Killed in action	"His exemplary leadership and courage resulted in the neutralization of ten (10) Abu Sayyaf Group (ASG) militants, the recovery of sixteen (16) high-powered firearms, and the successful rescue of two (2) wounded Marines."

=== Philippine Navy and Marine Corps ===
Image	Name	Rank	Place and date of action	Unit	Year awarded	Status	Notes
	Nestor Acero	Private First Class	Jolo, Sulu; 26-27 November 1972	7th Marine Company, Philippine Marine Corps	1983	Killed in action	"His gallant defense through ferocious fighting attracted heavy volume of enemy fire to concentrate on him, thus relieving the pressure on the withdrawing elements from incurring further casualty. When recovery teams were sent out after the savage battle, they found 30 or more dead outlaws in the periphery of the dead body of Private First Class Acero whose left arm was cradling the neck of Private First Class Buaya. This display of gallantry and heroism at the sacrifice of his beyond and above the call of duty distinguished Private First Class Acero as among the finest in the military service."
—	Custodio Parcon	Captain	Isabela, Basilan; 7-15 May 1993	61 Marine Reconnaissance Company	1993	Living	"Through skillful direction of friendly fires and maneuvers, his men evaded detection and sowed confusion within enemy lines while dislodging Abu Sayyaf elements from each bunker in close quarter battle." "... he single-handedly maneuvered forward and delivered fatal burst of fire to the enemy gunner, making the last defense of the Abu Sayyaf group to collapse, and forcing the remaining enemies to scamper in different directions, bringing with them their dead and wounded. The capture of Camp Al Madinah and the neutralization of 46 Abu Sayyaf extremists greatly pressured the enemy to release Luis Anthony Biel III."
—	Tomas Campo Jr.	Sergeant	Munai, Lanao del Norte; 11 April 2000	20th Marine Company, Marine Battalion Landing Team-10	2000	Killed in action	"Just when it seemed that his task was done, the Platoon Commander was hit by enemy fire. Sergeant Campo rushed back to the forward position to attend to and evacuate the officer, exposing himself once again to the intense hostile gunfire. In the process, he was fatally hit by enemy bullets, dying right there at the combat scene. All the 11 Marines he attended to have survived. Only the angel of mercy himself lost his life so that others may live."
—	Lolinato To-ong	First Lieutenant	Matanog, Maguindanao; 30 April 2000	52nd Marine Company, Force Reconnaissance Battalion	2000	Killed in action	"While providing fires, these courageous men were hit, unmindful of their wounds, maneuvered once more to another covered position and fired at the enemies until they were caught by the RPG blast which lifted their lifeless body momentarily from the ground. Their gallantry and act of heroism have greatly helped in extricating their wounded comrades thus minimizing casualties and preventing the possibility of total annihilation from the superior enemy forces."
—	Domingo Deluana	Sergeant	Matanog, Maguindanao; 30 April 2000	9th Marine Battalion	2000	Killed in action	"While providing fires, these courageous men were hit, unmindful of their wounds, maneuvered once more to another covered position and fired at the enemies until they were caught by the RPG blast which lifted their lifeless body momentarily from the ground. Their gallantry and act of heroism have greatly helped in extricating their wounded comrades thus minimizing casualties and preventing the possibility of total annihilation from the superior enemy forces."
—	Ariel Querubin	Lieutenant Colonel	Kauswagan, Lanao del Norte; 18-19 March 2000	Marine Battalion Landing Team-1	2001	Living	"... inspired courage in his men with his daring maneuvers, unmindful of his own safety, moving positions and drawing fire towards himself with the end of pinpointing where the enemy fire was coming from." "Under his inspiring leadership, his men fought ferociously forcing the enemy's last line of defense to collapse and sending them scampering to different directions along with their dead and wounded and leaving behind their vaunted rocket launchers and high powered firearms as well as documents of high intelligence value."
—	Herminigildo Yurong	Staff Sergeant	Matanog, Maguindanao; 29 May 2000	Marine Battalion Landing Team-2	2001	Killed in action	"Under the hail of heavy enemy fire and relentless RPG attacks, he audaciously moved from one hasty cover to another across the line of fire, crawling, leapfrogging, delivering potent accurate counter-fire, and throwing grenades towards every enemy position. Alone in the advance position, he repulsed the enemy counterattack almost single-handedly. It was unfortunate, however, that in the last instance, an RPG round found its mark near his position. The blast wounded him fatally which caused his instantaneous death."
—	Laurence Narag Sr.	Corporal	Kauswagan, Lanao del Norte; 3 April 2000	Team 1, 61st Marine Company, Force Reconnaissance Battalion	2001	Died from wounds	Narag, serving as radioman for his team during an operation, spied on a Moro rebel camp but was detected and shot at by enemy snipers. Wounded, he nevertheless radioed coordinates for artillery support and airstrikes. "An estimated 200 Moro fighters were then at the rebel camp. If not for Narag's efforts, the 18 other Marines in his team would have just fallen into a trap." "... he repeatedly rejected the plea of his other comrades that he be evacuated. With all the strength his dying body could ever muster, he gallantly fought back until the Commanding Officer of the unit himself dragged him towards the MEDEVAC vehicle."
—	Ernesto Layaguin	Corporal	Kauswagan, Lanao del Norte; 3 April 2000	61st Marine Company	2001	Killed in action	"... Corporal Layaguin braved all odds, without regard for his own safety, rushed forward to save the wounded Corporal Narag in order to extricate the latter to the rear position. He later on shielded Corporal Narag with his own body to secure the latter... In the process, he was hit by a sniper's bullet in the body. In spite of the wound sustained, he still managed to extricate Corporal Narag... unfortunately, a second sniper's bullet found its mark on his forehead that killed him instantaneously. He tried to save the life of a fellow Marine, never leaving him at the expense of his own life."
—	Gener G. Tinangag	Corporal	Marawi City, June 9, 2017	MBLT-5	2021	Killed in action	"Private First Class Tinangag along with three (3) other Marines volunteered to evacuate the wounded and killed troops to the Casualty Collection Point (CCP). After numerous trips of evacuating the wounded and killed troops from the engagement area to CCP under the hail of enemy fires, the rest of the team of Pfc Tinangag decided to sought cover and rest as they were too exhausted from carrying wounded and killed in action including their weapons and ammunition to the CCP. Disregarding his own safety and acting without orders, Pfc Tinangag stealthily maneuvered and crawled through the rubbles to get close to the casualties while fearlessly and repeatedly exposing himself from the enemies' line of fire. Without hesitation, Pfc Tinangag moved forward even through the hail of grenades and heavy machine gun fires making four more separate trips to rescue four (4) wounded Marines... Pfc Tinangag selflessly and single handedly saved the lives of four (40 Marines and extricated one (1) KIA in exchange of his own life."

=== Philippine Army Air Corps and Air Force ===
Image	Name	Rank	Place and date of action	Unit	Year awarded	Status	Notes
Jesus A. Villamor	Jesús A. Villamor	Lieutenant Colonel	Japanese-occupied Philippines; 27 December 1942 - November 1943	Allied Intelligence Bureau mission to the Philippines	1954	Deceased	"General Douglas MacArthur decided to get in touch with members of the resistance movement in the Philippines, and for this purpose he enlisted the services of Lieutenant Colonel Jesus Antonio Villamor to return to the islands. Notwithstanding the knowledge that such a mission was fought with hardships, difficulties, and risks to his own life, Lieutenant Colonel Villamor nevertheless volunteered to lead the first Allied Intelligence Bureau mission to the Philippines."
—	Danilo Atienza	Major	Sangley Air Station; 1 December 1989	6th Tactical Fighter Squadron	1990	Killed in action	Major Atienza led a trio of Northrop F-5 fighter aircraft that attacked the Sangley Air Station during the 1989 Philippine coup attempt resulting in the destruction of rebel air assets. However, Atienza failed to pull out during his last bombing run and crashed. Sangley Air Station was later renamed in his honor.
—	Ludegario Bactol	A2C	Camp Aguinaldo, Quezon City; December 1989	Provisional Rifle Company, Security and Escort Group, GHQ & HSC, AFP	1990	Deceased	Bactol was an airman defending Camp Aguinaldo during the 1989 Philippine coup attempt. He fired on the leading rebel LVT-6 armore0d fighting vehicle with a 90mm recoilless rifle as the Reform the Armed Forces Movement rebels attempted to enter the base, preventing the following military vehicles from pushing through the gate.
Air Cadet M G Baloyo	Mary Grace Baloyo	1st Lieutenant	Mabalacat, Pampanga; 26 March 2001	15th Strike Wing, Philippine Air Force	4 April 2001	Deceased	On 26 March 2001, the plane Lt. Baloyo was flying, a North American Rockwell OV-10 Bronco, experienced engine trouble and rapidly descended into a heavily populated area. Instead of ejecting, she chose to stay on board and diverted the plane before it crashed, thereupon killing herself.

=== Philippine Constabulary ===
Image	Name	Rank	Place and date of action	Unit	Year awarded	Status	Notes
	Desiderio Suson	Technical Sergeant	Gamay, Northern Samar; 31 October 1980	Philippine Constabulary	1981	Deceased	"Surrounded on all sides and with no way to escape, then Sergeant Suson ordered his men to make every shot count by aiming accurately, and to hold their ground at all cost. Sensing his men were momentarily paralyzed because of shock, he went leapfrogging from one foxhole to another to direct their fire. Despite the blood oozing from his wounds, he never lost composure."
	Isaias Silvestre Jr.	Master Sergeant	Lupon, Davao Oriental; 14 May 1985	433rd Philippine Constabulary Company	1985	Living	"Although outnumbered 8 to 1, the beleaguered troops fought with intense ferocity, while their leader, with his exceptional marksmanship, fatally shot one by one the other terrorists as they crawled towards the patrol base. Although wounded, he accounted for six terrorists including Commander Mortar, the leader of the terrorists whom he shot in the forehead at the time when the subversive terrorist leader was calling on the troopers through a megaphone to surrender."
	Jacinto Moreno	Sergeant	Maslog, Eastern Samar; 23 May 1985	Maslog Patrol Base	1986	Living	"... gallantly fought and successfully defended the patrol base with only six military men and nine members of the Civilian Defense Forces against the attack of an overwhelming number of superior enemy..."

=== United States Army ===
Image	Name	Rank	Place and date of action	Unit	Year awarded	Status	Notes
Douglas MacArthur	Douglas MacArthur	General of the Army	Philippine Islands; October 1944 to March 1945	South West Pacific Area	20 October 1944	Deceased	General MacArthur was awarded the Philippine Armed Forces Medal of Valor in October 1944 in recognition of his leadership in liberating the Philippines from the Japanese Army.
Jonathan Wainwright	Jonathan Wainwright	General	Philippine Islands; October 1944 to March 1945	South West Pacific Area	1 May 1947	Deceased	General Jonathan Wainwright received the Philippine Medal of Valor in a ceremony at the Philippine Embassy by Ambassador Joaquin Elizalde on behalf of President Manuel Roxas of the Philippine Republic.

=== Discrepancies in the record ===
The official number of Philippine Medal of Valor recipients is currently given as 41. However, Mary Grace Baloyo, a Philippine Air Force pilot who died in a crash on 26 March 2001 and is on record as being conferred the medal by former President Gloria Macapagal Arroyo on 3 April 2001, is not included in the summary of recipients.

== Statistics ==
Composition of recipients, living and deceased: 1. Living (41.0%); 2. Deceased (59.0%)	Composition of recipients, officers and enlisted personnel: 1. Officers (46.0%); 2. Enlisted personnel (54.0%)	Composition of recipients by service: 1. Philippine Army (64.0%); 2. Philippine Navy-Marine Corps (22.0%); 3. Philippine Air Force (7.00%); 4. Philippine Constabulary (7.00%)	Composition of recipients by type of conferment: 1. Posthumous (39.0%); 2. Antemortem (61.0%)

== Notes ==
1.The Philippine Constabulary was merged with the Integrated National Police on 29 January 1991, forming the Philippine National Police.
