= Ian Paquit =

Philippine Army officer (1992–2013)

Ian O. Paquit
- Born: 16 March 1992; Pagadian, Zamboanga del Sur, Philippines
- Died: 24 September 2013 (aged 21); Zamboanga City, Philippines
- Military career
- Allegiance: Philippines
- Branch: Philippine Army
- Service years: 2010-2013
- Rank: Private First Class
- Service number: 892139
- Units: 3rd Scout Ranger Company, 1st Scout Ranger Regiment
- Conflicts: Zamboanga City crisis
- Awards: Philippine Medal of Valor

Ian O. Paquit (16 March 1992 - 24 September 2013) was a Philippine Army enlisted soldier and a recipient the Philippines' highest military award for courage, the Medal of Valor. Paquit was assigned as an automatic rifleman in the 3rd Scout Ranger Company of the 1st Scout Ranger Regiment, which was deployed to fight the Moro National Liberation Front faction that continues to recognize Nur Misuari as the MNLF Chairman, during the 2013 Zamboanga City crisis.

On 24 September 2013, Paquit died from wounds sustained while providing suppressive fire to enable his fellow soldiers to relocate after his unit came under heavy enemy fire that degraded the available cover.

Paquit, at 21 years of age, is the youngest recipient of the Medal of Valor.

== Zamboanga City crisis ==
The Zamboanga City crisis began on 9 September 2013 when a faction of the Moro National Liberation Front attempted to raise the flag of the self-proclaimed Bangsamoro Republik at Zamboanga City Hall. This short-lived, unrecognized state had earlier declared its independence on 12 August 2013 in Talipao, Sulu.

=== Death ===
Paquit had been wounded in action by shrapnel to his face on 13 September 2013. Despite the injury, he returned to active combat duty shortly after being treated. On 24 September 2013, the third week of the conflict and four days before the cessation of hostilities, the section of the Scout Ranger unit to which Paquit belonged figured in a heavy exchange of fire with the Moro rebels. Paquit adjusted his position for a better line of sight on the enemy and provided suppressive fire as his fellow soldiers relocated to a more covered position. He however, sustained a gunshot injury to the neck that proved fatal.

Paquit was conferred the Medal of Valor on 20 December 2013. Part of his medal citation reads,

"During the operations, heavy exchanges of fire trapped a section of the 3rd Scout Ranger Company. Due to massive firepower coming from the well-entrenched enemy forces and deteriorating cover, Private First Class Paquit adjusted his position to a better line of sight to provide cover fire for the repositioning troops, notwithstanding his vulnerability to enemy fire... With courage, dedication and sacrifice of PFC Paquit, further casualties were avoided and the neutralization of enemy firing positions greatly contributed to the clearing and capture of enemy strongholds..."

== Personal life ==
Paquit is survived by his father Eduardo, elder sister Irene and younger brother Ironel.

== In popular culture ==
Actor Joshua Garcia played the role of Paquit in the anthology series Maalaala Mo Kaya episode "Medalya" last June 22, 2019 dedicated for the story about the 2013 Zamboanga Siege.
