= Laurence Narag Sr. =

Laurence M. Narag, Sr.
- Died: 3 April 2000; Kauswagan, Lanao del Norte, Philippines
- Military career
- Allegiance: Philippines
- Branch: Philippine Marine Corps
- Rank: Corporal
- Service number: 788562
- Units: 61st Marine Company, Force Reconnaissance Battalion, Philippine Marine Corps
- Conflicts: 2000 Philippine campaign against the Moro Islamic Liberation Front; Moro conflict
- Awards: Medal of Valor

Laurence M. Narag, Sr. was an enlisted Marine of the Philippine Marine Corps and a posthumous recipient of the Philippines' highest military award for courage, the Medal of Valor. Corporal Narag served as a radioman with 61st Marine Company, Force Reconnaissance Battalion during the 2000 Philippine campaign against the Moro Islamic Liberation Front. During a military operation in Kauswagan, Lanao del Norte, Narag conducted reconnaissance on an entrenched MILF position but was detected and drew sniper fire. He was eventually wounded but managed to establish contact with a Philippine Air Force OV-10 Bronco and was able to coordinate close air support.

A hospital corpsman, Corporal Ernesto Layaguin attempted to come to his aid but was himself wounded and eventually hit by sniper fire that caused his death. Narag continued firing at the enemy and coordinating air strikes despite his wounds. His commanding officer eventually had to drag him to a medevac vehicle for evacuation. Narag died of wounds later in a hospital.

== Medal of Valor citation ==
Corporal Laurence M Narag 788562 Philippine Marines

"For acts of conspicuous courage, gallantry and intrepidity at the risk of life above and beyond the call of duty while serving as Radioman, Team 1, 61st Marine Company, Force Reconnaissance Battalion, placed OPCON with MBLT-1, 1MBDe during the 10-hour encounter with about 200 fully armed MILF rebels that were encamped at Sitio Illan, Delabayan, Kauswagan, Lanao del Norte on 030730H April 2000.

Realizing that the neutralization of the MILF snipers and the other rebels entrenched in fortified bunkers depended upon calls for artillery fire and close air support, Cpl Narag disregarded his own safety and dashed closer, alone, simultaneously delivering effective sniper fires to the enemy, in order to efficiently transmit their positions. At the height of the gun battle, enemy sniper fires where concentrated upon Cpl Narag, wounding him in the body. Cpl Layaguin, a corpsman, attempted to rescue him, but was also unfortunately hit by sniper fire. In an intense display of human drama as witnessed by the troops, the wounded Cpl Narag crept inch by inch to a position where he sought for cover and fiercely retaliated fire upon the enemy. This single act of Cpl Narag relieved the pressure from the rest of his unit whose members were then subjected to an unexpected heavy volume of fire from the enemy. Eventually, the other team members were able to maneuver to vantage positions and through this, still, Cpl Narag held on to the original position he occupied manning the only operational radio left that his platoon had, still continuously firing and inflicting casualties upon the enemy. With an outstanding presence of mind in such a critical situation, he was able to establish radio contact with the OV-10 aircraft and coordinated close air support for his still embattled unit. Evidently, the aircraft delivered a very accurate bombing run against the enemy. Realizing that they were only 19 by then, and without friendly reinforcement, he repeatedly rejected the plea of his other comrades that he be evacuated. With all strength his dying body could ever muster, he gallantly fought back until the Commanding Officer of the unit himself dragged him towards the MEDEVAC vehicle. As he was able to establish contact with the OV-10 despite his mortal wounds, he saved the lives of many other Marines. His supreme sacrifice and gallant stand to fight despite the odds so inspired the other team members that the occupation of MILF Camps Delabayan became inevitable. Based on SIGINT reports, 40 MILF were killed and undetermined number of enemies were wounded as a result of the very accurate OV-10 bombing made possible by the late Cpl Narag.

By this gallantry, Cpl Narag did not only distinguish himself in combat, but acted beyond the call of duty in keeping with finest tradition of Filipino soldiery."

== Personal life ==
Laurence Narag, Sr. is survived by his wife, Leset Narag, and their three children that includes the youngest, Laurence Jr.
