= Roy Cuenca =

Roy L. Cuenca
- Military career
- Allegiance: Philippines
- Branch: Philippine Army
- Rank: Staff Sergeant
- Service number: 638602
- Units: 29th Infantry Battalion, 4th Infantry Division
- Conflicts: CPP-NPA-NDF rebellion
- Awards: Medal of Valor

Roy L. Cuenca is a retired Philippine Army enlisted trooper and a recipient the Philippines' highest military award for courage, the Medal of Valor.

== Firefight against the New People's Army ==
Sergeant Cuenca was serving as the commander of a CAFGU auxiliary unit in Tandag, Surigao del Sur, Philippines on 20 October 1991 when his unit engaged in a firefight with 100 New People's Army rebels under the command of a certain Commander Pawing. Cuenca was wounded during the three-hour gun battle, but was able to maintain effective leadership of his auxiliaries, forcing the NPAs to withdraw and leaving nine of their number dead on the battlefield.

Cuenca was conferred the Medal of Valor for his actions in 1992.

== Medal of Valor citation ==
Staff Sergeant Roy L Cuenca 638602 PA
Salvacion, Tandag, Surigao Del Sur - 20 October 1991

"For outstanding courage, steadfast and conspicuous gallantry in action, greatly risking his life in extremely dangerous situation above and beyond the call of duty while serving as Cadre Commander of CAFGU Active Auxiliary Salvacion Patrol base, Headquarters and Headquarters Company, 29th Infantry (MATATAG) Battalion, 4th Infantry (DIAMOND) Division, Philippine Army during a fierce fire fight against one hundred (100) heavily armed NPA rebels at vicinity Barangay Salvacion, Tandag, Surigao del Sur on 200430 October 1991. STAFF SERGEANT CUENCA was critically wounded on his buttock when the enemy under the command of Commander PAWING, the Vice Commanding Officer the Communist Party’s Main Regional Unit, Northern Mindanao Regional Committee, launched a surprise attack by unleashing heavy volume of fires from 40mm grenade launcher. By maintaining his presence of mind despite the wound on his buttock, he ferociously fought the enemy, rallied his men and ordered systematic maneuvers and strict adherence to fire discipline by firing only at sure enemy targets to conserve ammunition.

With his brilliance in combat, STAFF SERGEANT CUENCA repeatedly repulsed and subdued the enemy’s continued attempts to overrun their detachment. Although outnumbered, he led his men in holding their ground for almost three (3) hours of heavy firefight with the enemy. Finally, he was able to repel the enemy that caused them to withdraw leaving behind nine (9) dead bodies, one (1) calibre 30 BAR, one (1) M203, one (1) calibre 7.62 M14 rifle, four (4) calibre 5.56 M16 rifles, one (1) calibre 30 M1 Garand rifle, one (1) improvised anti-tank landmine, one (1) medical kit and voluminous subversive documents of high intelligence value. By his laudable feat and indomitable bravery, STAFF SERGEANT CUENCA upheld the finest traditions of Filipino soldiery that earned distinct credit and honor not only for himself and the Philippine Army but also for the Armed Forces of the Philippines as well."
