= Jacinto Moreno =

Retired Philippine trooper

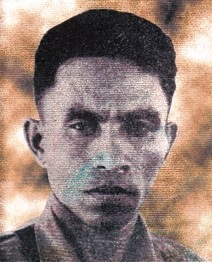
- Military career
- Allegiance: Philippines
- Branch: Philippine Constabulary
- Rank: Sergeant
- Service number: 665546
- Unit: Philippine Constabulary
- Conflicts: Communist rebellion in the Philippines
- Awards: Philippine Medal of Valor

Jacinto Moreno is a retired Philippine Constabulary enlisted trooper and a recipient the Philippines' highest military award for courage, the Medal of Valor. Moreno was assigned as the assistant non-Commissioned Officer-in-charge of the Maslog Patrol Base in Maslog, Eastern Samar on 23 May 1985 when the base came under attack from approximately 60 armed rebels. Defending the base with Moreno were six other military men and nine members of the Integrated Civilian Home Defense Forces. Moreno assumed command of the base defense when his superior grew weak from blood loss due to wounds.

== Medal of Valor citation ==
"By direction of the President, pursuant to paragraph 3a, Section I, Armed Forces of the Philippines Regulations G 131–052, this Headquarters, dated 24 April 1967, the MEDAL FOR VALOR is hereby awarded to:

Sergeant Jacinto Moreno 665546

Philippine Constabulary

"for conspicuous gallantry and intrepidity at the risk of life, above and beyond the call of duty, as Assistant Non-Commissioned Officer-In-Charge of Maslog Patrol Base, Eastern Samar who gallantry fought and successfully defended the patrol base with only six military men and nine members of the Civilian Defense Forces against the attack of an overwhelming number of superior enemy on 23 May 1985. After confirming a report at late afternoon of 22 May that about 60 armed men were in the public cemetery near Poblacion, the troops planned an attack at dawn. But before they could jump off, the base was riddled by enemy fire, hitting Staff Sergeant Fortes, the Team Leader. Though wounded, he ordered his men to hold their positions and fight. The battle raged on and Staff Sergeant Fortes, still weak due to loss of blood, finally passed on the leadership to Sergeant Moreno who immediately brought Staff Sergeant Fortes in a safe area. Then, he took the former’s M16 rifle and manned a machine gun. When it was light, they saw the overwhelming enemy, with three M60 machine guns, aside from their assault rifles. Unfazed, he braved the hail of bullets around him and felled the enemy machine gunner. As the battle raged, he realized that they might run out of ammunition before reinforcements arrived. He ordered his men to shift (from) full-automatic to semi-automatic fire and cautioned them to stay calm and fire accurately. He then maneuvered from one position to another, hitting and felling several advancing terrorists, temporarily slowing down their attack. The fierce battle lasted for three hours when the raiders finally withdrew. There were 30 enemies accounted dead while 15 more were found at the scene of encounter. By this display of exceptional courage and high degree of leadership, Sergeant Moreno distinguished himself in the field of combat in keeping with the highest tradition of Filipino soldiery."
