= Ernesto Layaguin =

Ernesto A. Layaguin
- Died: 3 April 2000; Kauswagan, Lanao del Norte, Philippines
- Military career
- Allegiance: Philippines
- Branch: Philippine Marine Corps
- Rank: Corporal
- Service number: 789124
- Units: 61st Marine Company; Philippine Marine Corps
- Conflicts: 2000 Philippine campaign against the Moro Islamic Liberation Front; Moro conflict
- Awards: Medal of Valor

Ernesto A. Layaguin was an enlisted hospital corpsman of the Philippine Marine Corps and a posthumous recipient of the Philippines' highest military award for courage, the Medal of Valor. Corporal Layaguin served with the 61st Marine Company during the 2000 Philippine campaign against the Moro Islamic Liberation Front. During a military operation in Kauswagan, Lanao del Norte, Layaguin attempted to come to the aid of a fellow Marine Corporal Laurence Narag Sr., who had conducted reconnaissance on an entrenched MILF position but was detected and drew sniper fire. Narag was eventually wounded but managed to establish contact with a Philippine Air Force OV-10 Bronco and was able to coordinate close air support. Layaguin attempted to come to his aid but was himself wounded and eventually hit by sniper fire that caused his death. Narag was eventually evacuated but died of his wounds in a hospital.

== Medal of Valor citation ==
Corporal Ernesto A Layaguin 789124 Philippine Marines

"For acts of conspicuous courage, gallantry and intrepidity at the risk of life above and beyond the call of duty while serving as Corpsman, 61st Marine Company, Philippine Marine Corps, Philippine Navy during a 10-hour encounter with about 200 fully armed MILF rebels that were encamped at Sitio Ilian, Delabayan, Kauswagan, Lanao del Norte on 03 April 2002.

Realizing that the key to the enemy's destruction in that prolonged encounter was the vital calls for artillery fire and close air support which Corporal Narag, a radioman was coordinating through the radio, Corporal Layaguin braved all odds, without regard for his own safety, rushed forward to save the wounded Corporal Narag in order to extricate the latter to the rear position. He later on shielded Corporal Narag with his own body to secure the latter and the radio which is the most important thing they had at that moment and to which the lives of the rest of the team depended upon. In the process, he was hit by a sniper's bullet in the body. In spite of the wound sustained, he still managed to extricate Corporal Narag, agonizingly creeping inch by inch while dragging his comrade to safety. After dragging the radioman to a safer distance, he tended to the wounds of his comrade, but unfortunately, a second sniper's bullet found its mark on his forehead that killed him instantaneously. He tried to save the life of a fellow Marine, never leaving him at the expense of his own life. His gallant deed so inspired the other members of the team to fight on more fiercely, that after 10-hour gun-battle, the enemy suffered 40 killed and a great number were wounded which forced them to flee in different directions. This led to the eventual seizure of the formidable MILF camp at Delabayan.

By this gallant deed, Corporal Layaguin distinguished himself in combat in the finest traditions of Filipino Soldiery."
