= Francisco Granfil =

Francisco G. Granfil
- Military career
- Allegiance: Philippines
- Branch: Philippine Army
- Rank: Sergeant
- Service number: 647705
- Units: Operational Team 1103, 11th Special Forces Company, Home Defense Group (Airborne)
- Conflicts: Communist rebellion in the Philippines
- Awards: Medal of Valor

Francisco G. Granfil is a retired Philippine Army enlisted trooper and a recipient the Philippines' highest military award for courage, the Medal of Valor.

Sergeant Granfil was part of a combined force of Philippine Army Special Forces, a platoon of Philippine Constabulary troopers and CHDF paramilitaries undertaking a patrol in Tarragona, Davao Oriental, Philippines on 12 February 1988 when they were ambushed by approximately 100 New People's Army rebels. Granfil immediately came to the relief of the pinned-down elements of the patrol. He managed to evacuate the wounded government troops to a secure area and recovered their firearms, which he distributed to the unarmed paramilitaries. He then put a malfunctioning M60 machine gun into action, alternating this with fire from a 60mm mortar until the communist rebels withdrew.

Granfil was conferred the Medal of Valor in 1989.

== Medal of Valor citation ==
"By direction of the President, pursuant to paragraph 1-6a, Section II, Chapter I, Armed Forces of the Philippines Regulations G 131-053, this Headquarters, dated 1 July 1986, the MEDAL FOR VALOR is hereby awarded to:

Sergeant Francisco G Granfil 647705
Philippine Army

for outstanding courage, conspicuous gallantry and intrepidity at the risk of life above and beyond the call of duty, during an encounter with about 100 armed terrorists of the New People’s Army at Upper Limot, Tarragona, Davao Oriental, on 12 February 1988, while serving as a member of the Operational Team 1103, 11th Special Forces Company, Home Defense Group (Airborne) Philippine Army. When the combined patrol groups composed of a reinforced platoon of the 433rd Philippine Constabulary Company, the Operation Team 1103 and the Civilian Home Defense Forces were ambushed, Sergeant Granfil fearlessly, with determination and fierce fighting spirit, charged towards the pinned down lead elements of the government forces to provide the crucial cover and counter fires, the swiftness and effectiveness of which caught the enemy by surprise, thus inflicting upon the terrorists several casualties at this crucial stage of the combat action. By accurate and controlled fires and maneuver, he kept the stunned enemy at bay. Driven further by a deep sense of duty and the highest ideal of the profession of arms, he crawled stealthily towards the wounded at great risk to his life, and despite intense enemy fire, successfully retrieved his fallen buddies, including the already wounded Patrol Leader Lieutenant Rolito Bordeos of the Philippine Constabulary, whom he dragged out of the perilous killing zone to a relatively secured area. To prevent the enemy from getting the firearms of the wounded, he systematically recovered twelve high-powered firearms of the wounded which, with admirable presence of mind, he distributed to the Civilian Home Defense Force, since many of whom had no firearms in order to strengthen the fire power of the beleaguered government forces to seize the initiative and engaged the enemy in a well-directed and controlled fire. Under intense and continuous barrage from the enemy, Sergeant Granfil, having repaired a M60 Machinegun of Constable Second Class Reguyal, which earlier malfunctioned, boldly returned fires towards the well-emplaced and numerically superior enemy force. Despite his sensing the advance of the reinforcing rebels coming from the main body, he steadfastly stood his ground and fiercely fought with automatic fires and grenade launchers, while interchangeably operating the 60 millimeter mortar until the enemy withdrew, leaving behind 37 terrorists killed and several others wounded. This conspicuous and heroic act of Sergeant Granfil prevented the complete annihilation of the beleaguered troops, the saving of many lives and prevented the loss of government properties. By this display of exceptional courage and a high degree of leadership, Sergeant Granfil distinguished himself in the field of combat in keeping with the highest tradition of Filipino Soldiery, thereby earning honor and glory not only for himself and the Philippine Army but also for the Armed Forces of the Philippines."
