= Romualdo Rubi =

Soldier of the Philippine Army

- Born: Feb 07 1962; Kalinga - Apayao, Mountain Province, Philippines
- Died: May 29, 2018 (aged 56-57)
- Military career
- Allegiance: Philippines
- Branch: Philippine Army
- Rank: Major
- Nickname: "Lolong"
- Service number: 713103
- Units: 1st Scout Ranger Regiment; 3rd Infantry Division
- Conflicts: CPP-NPA-NDF rebellion
- Awards: Medal of Valor

Romualdo Rubi was a Philippine Army enlisted trooper and a recipient the Philippines' highest military award for courage, the Medal of Valor. Rubi was a First Lieutenant in 2015.

He died due to chronic asthma on May 29, 2018.

== Firefight against the New People's Army ==
Then-Corporal Rubi was on his way back to his detachment of Scout Rangers attached to the 29th Infantry Battalion in Surigao del Sur, Philippines from leave with his family in Surigao City on 18 March 1991. Typhoon Auring had ravaged the country two days before and the bus he had been riding had to stop several times in order for the road to be cleared of fallen trees and other debris. It was later discovered that same road had been laid with land mines by the communist New People's Army.

In the afternoon, Rubi and a fellow soldier stopped for a late lunch at Claver, Surigao del Norte. A Philippine Constabulary detachment was perched on top of a hill near where the pair were eating. Unbeknownst to them, the NPAs were ransacking the PC detachment at that very moment after finding it abandoned. Rubi and his companion walked to the port after their meal, having decided to take a boat to his destination. At this point the communist rebels must have spotted Rubi and came after him. Rubi made a stand at the end of the wharf; he had approximately 200 rounds of ammunition for his M16 rifle and two grenades from his companion, whom he advised to leave as he was armed with nothing more than a pistol. Rubi estimated that at least 100 NPA fighters were attacking his position. He was credited with killing 8 of them, including NPA Commander Lima. The NPAs withdrew after a three-hour firefight.

For his actions during the firefight, Rubi was conferred the Medal of Valor in 1991.

=== Medal of Valor citation ===
CORPORAL ROMUALDO C RUBI 713103 PA

Surigao Del Sur- 15 March 1991

"For acts of conspicuous gallantry and intrepidity at the risk of life, above and beyond the call of duty, during an encounter with heavily armed and numerically superior NPA rebels at Barangay Hayanggabon, Claver, Surigao del Norte, on 18 March 1991.

While on his way from a visit to his family to join his unit, the Special Operations Team of the 29th Infantry Battalion, 4ID, PA operating in Tandag, Surigao del Sur, and while waiting for the departure of the pump boat which will take him to Tandag, about 100 terrorists under Commander Lima, Commanding Officer of Sub-Regional Guerilla Unit F-16, Surigao del Norte Provincial Party Committee swooped down on a nearby PC Detachment. Faced with imminent danger, he immediately fired his M16 rifle towards the enemy position hitting three of them. A roaring volley of enemy fire was then focused on him. However, he was able to run and maneuver for cover at the end of the Hayanggabon wharf, about 200 meters away where he established a defense position. Eight terrorists suddenly dashed towards his position but he singlehandedly confronted the approaching enemy, hitting them at close range and killing three of them and wounding the rest. The enraged Commander Lima, together with another seven of his men, and with the support of cover fires from an M203 grenade launcher and an M60 Machine Gun, simultaneously advanced and fired to neutralize him. Despite the seemingly impossible situation he was in, he resolutely fought the advancing enemy, thereby fatally hitting Commander Lima and one of his companions.

The death of Commander Lima lessened the enemy pressure and gave him the chance to withdraw from his position after two hours of intense firefight. Sensing that the enemy reinforcement was fast approaching and knowing that he could no longer sustain a prolonged engagement due to his dwindling ammunition, he then decided to swim with a pump boat along his side for cover. At exactly 1700H, about 90 more terrorists arrived to overwhelm him. As he cunningly maneuvered for about 100 meters away from the terrorists from the far end of the wharf, he courageously exchanged fire again hitting some of them until he finally reached the PC Company Headquarters at Hayanggabon. This encounter resulted in eight enemies killed, including Commander Lima, and three others wounded.

By this indomitable courage, CORPORAL RUBI distinguished himself in combat in keeping with the finest tradition of Filipino soldiery."

== In popular culture ==
Rubi's life story was told in an episode of Maalaala Mo Kaya entitled "Medal for Valor" in 2009. Rubi was portrayed by Filipino actor Jhong Hilario.
