= Tomas Campo Jr. =

Filipino Marine sergeant and posthumous Medal of Valor recipient

Tomas V. Campo, Jr.
- Died: 11 April 2000; Munai, Lanao del Norte, Philippines
- Military career
- Allegiance: Philippines
- Branch: Philippine Marine Corps
- Rank: Sergeant
- Service number: 755345
- Units: 20th Marine Company, Marine Battalion Landing Team-10, Philippine Marine Corps
- Conflicts: 2000 Philippine campaign against the Moro Islamic Liberation Front; Moro conflict
- Awards: Medal of Valor

Tomas V. Campo, Jr. was a hospital corpsman of the Philippine Marine Corps and a posthumous recipient of the Philippines' highest military award for courage, the Medal of Valor. Sergeant Campo served with the 20th Marine Company of Marine Battalion Landing Team-10 during the 2000 Philippine campaign against the Moro Islamic Liberation Front. In a military operation to capture Camp Bilal, an MILF stronghold in Munai, Lanao del Norte, Campo came to the aid of 10 Marines wounded by hostile fire, pulling them to safety and treating their wounds. As he attempted to rescue an 11th casualty, he was hit by enemy fire and killed in action.

== Medal of Valor citation ==
Sergeant Tomas V Campo Jr 755345 Philippine Marines

"For acts of conspicuous courage, gallantry and intrepidity at the risk of life above and beyond the call of duty during an encounter with 150 heavily Armed MILF separatists on or about 111130H April 2000 along Liangan River, Munai, Lanao del Norte while serving as Hospital Corpsman of the 20th Marine Company, Marine Battalion Landing Team-10, Philippine Marine Corps, Philippine Navy.

MBLT-10 was tasked as the main effort in a brigade size operations launched by the 1st Marine Brigade to capture Camp Bilal, a major MILF stronghold located in Barangay Dalama (GS 1588), Munai, Lanao del Norte with 20th Marine Company as the lead assault unit. At Vicinity GC 158915, GC 159919 and GC165917 pre-positioned MILF rebels in well fortified trenches opened fire with heavy volume of small arms and mortars at the advancing Marines. In the fierce exchange of firefight, 10 Marines in the forward positions were hit by the enemy fires. Sergeant Campo, the corpsman of 20MC, upon seeing his fellow Marines hit by hostile fire, rushed forward to treat the wounded. He did not leave the casualties exposed in the open. He pulled each one of them to places safe from heavy sniper and mortar fires. Amidst the hail of enemy bullets and mortar explosions, in utter disregard for his own safety, he did this supremely courageous act repeatedly and relentlessly, treating and moving the 10 wounded one after the other to covered grounds. Just when it seemed that his task was done, the Platoon Commander was hit by enemy fire. Sergeant Campo rushed back to the forward position to attend to and evacuate the officer, exposing himself once again to the intense hostile gunfire. In the process, he was fatally hit by enemy bullets, dying right there at the combat scene. During this fierce encounter, the enemy sustained more casualties than the Marines. The courage and valor of Sergeant Campo is not measured by the number of enemies killed and wounded, but rather by the number of lives of his fellow Marines he saved. All the 11 Marines he attended to have survived. Only the angel of mercy himself lost his life so that others may live.

Sergeant Campo has incomparably distinguished himself in combat, which is in keeping with the finest traditions of Filipino Soldiery."
