= Weene Martillana =

- Military career
- Allegiance: Philippines
- Branch: Philippine Army
- Rank: Corporal
- Service number: 504735
- Unit: 1st Scout Ranger Regiment
- Conflicts: Hukbalahap rebellion
- Awards: Philippine Medal of Valor

Weene Martillana was a Philippine Army enlisted trooper who was awarded the Philippines' highest military award for courage, the Medal of Valor.

In 1955, Martillana and fellow Scout Ranger Master Sergeant Francisco Camacho Sr. were tasked by their commander, Ernesto S. Mata, to neutralize Hukbalahap guerrilla commander Eddie Villapando, who was operating in Cavite, Laguna and Batangas. In the subsequent military operation, Camacho and Martillana succeeded in killing Villapando and his bodyguards; Camacho died of wounds suffered during the firefight.

== Operation Secret ==
The intelligence operation, designated "Operation Secret", was deemed very risky. Camacho and Martillana posed as civilians and befriended Villapando and his bodyguards. On 20 December 1955, Camacho, Martillana, Villapando and two Hukbalahap bodyguards were aboard a jeep traveling the highway from San Pablo City and Calauan town in Laguna with Camacho at the wheel. He pulled over in front of the gate of what is now the International Rice Research Institute in Barangay Maahas in Los Baños, Laguna on the pretence of checking on the engine.

As Camacho got off the vehicle, Martillana did the same. One asked the other, "Malamig, ano?" ("It's cold, isn't it?"). The response was, "Oo nga." ("Yes, it is."): their pre-arranged signal to begin the attack. They grabbed two submachine guns and opened fire, killing Villapando and one of his bodyguards. The other, though seriously wounded, shot Camacho before dying; Camacho later died at a hospital.

Master Sergeant Camacho and Corporal Martillana were awarded the Medal of Valor by President Ramon Magsaysay, posthumously in Camacho's case. At the time, the two Scout Rangers were the only enlisted personnel to receive the medal.

== Medal of Valor citation ==
"By direction of the President, pursuant to paragraphs 2a, Section I, AFPR G 131-051, this Headquarters, dated 21 January 1954, the Medal for Valor is hereby posthumously awarded to:

Corporal Weene Martillana 522227 PA

For distinguishing himself conspicuously by gallantry and intrepidity at the risk of his life above and beyond the call of duty. Corporal Martillana together with Master Sergeant Camacho, Members of 1st Scout Ranger Regiment, posed as civilians and befriended Eddie Villapando, notorious Huk Commander who terrorized Cavite and Batangas for many years. With Master Sergeant Camacho as leader, these enlisted men, after establishing contact with Villapando in September 1955, skillfully and at great risk to themselves, managed to win the confidence of Villapando and his bodyguards. On or about 2200 hours, 20 December 1955, the opportunity to bring success to the project came when Villapando, Commander Gueverra, two huk bodyguards, Master Sergeant Camacho and Corporal Martillana were riding in a jeep. Master Sergeant Camacho, who was at the wheel, stopped at the vicinity of Barrio Tabon, Calauan, Laguna on the pretense that the jeep needed some oil. He got out of the vehicle to pour oil on the engine, while corporal Martillana followed presumably to help him. At a pre-arranged signal they immediately opened fire on the Huks and, with concentrated fire, they were able to kill Commander Villapando, Commander Gueverra and one Huk bodyguard. One of the Huks managed to shoot back, hitting Corporal Martillana, who died soon afterwards. The extraordinary heroism and indomitable courage displayed by Corporal Martillana will inevitably form a part of the glorious traditions of our Armed Forces."

== Commemoration ==
Camp Weene Martillana, a Philippine Army camp in Pili, Camarines Sur, is named in his honor.
