= Miguel Pastolero =

Philippine Army enlisted trooper

Miguel D. Pastolero
- Died: 26 October 1951; Libacao, Capiz
- Military career
- Allegiance: Philippines
- Branch: Philippine Army
- Rank: Staff Sergeant
- Service number: 168443
- Unit: Military Intelligence Service
- Conflicts: Hukbalahap rebellion
- Awards: Medal of Valor

Miguel D. Pastolero was a Philippine Army enlisted trooper and a recipient the Philippines' highest military award for courage, the Medal of Valor.

In 1951 Pastolero and other members of a military intelligence commando team infiltrated a Hukbong Mapagpalaya ng Bayan (HMB) headquarters in Libacao, Capiz where a conference among HMB officers was taking place. As their presence was detected by the communist rebels, a firefight ensued, wounding Pastolero and killing one of his companions. Before dying from his wounds, Pastolero was able to fire his weapon and accounted for eight of the twenty-two HMBs killed in action.

== Medal of Valor citation ==
"By direction of the President, pursuant to paragraph 2a, Section I, AFPR G 131-51, this Headquarters, dated 21 January 1954, the MEDAL FOR VALOR is hereby posthumously awarded to:

Staff Sergeant Miguel D Pastolero 168443 PA

for outstanding courage, conspicuous gallantry and intrepidity at the risk of his life above and beyond the call of duty displayed in an encounter against a numerically superior dissident force at Sitio Taroytoy, Barrio Manica, Libacao, Capiz, on or about 0730H 26 October 1951, Staff Sergeant Miguel Pastolero, after weeks of careful surveillance and employing all means of deception possible under the circumstances, succeeded in passing through dissident outpost guards and infiltrated right into an enemy Headquarters where ranking officers of the HMB organization were in conference. Staff Sergeant Pastolero and his men, unmindful of the suspicious glances of dissidents and pretending to be members of the group, mingled with them freely but began placing themselves in commanding positions to be able to deliver the greatest volume of fire, if and when occasion for it arose. The dissidents in the meanwhile were talking about the plan of reorganization and indoctrination of new members to replace those who have deserted their ranks. The presence of the MIS Commando Team was finally detected and the dissidents began to fire at the members of the team, killing instantly Agent Jose Pastorate and wounding Staff Sergeant Pastolero. Recovering from the initial impact of the shot in utter disregard of his personal safety, he loaded his Browning Automatic rifle and immediately fired at the dissidents, singling them out from the mass of humanity then engaged in a mortal hand-to-hand struggle. Staff Sergeant Pastolero was able to empty his magazine before he expired and in his dying moments accounted for eight (8) HMBs out of the twenty two (22) dissidents killed during the melee. His coolness under fire, his indomitable courage, his fortitude and his fighting spirit are in keeping with the highest traditions of the Armed Forces of the Philippines."
