= Desiderio Suson =

Desiderio P. Suson
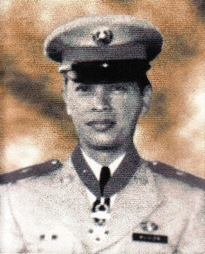
- Military career
- Allegiance: Philippines
- Branch: Philippine Constabulary
- Rank: Technical Sergeant
- Service number: 575127
- Unit: Philippine Constabulary
- Conflicts: Communist rebellion in the Philippines
- Awards: Philippine Medal of Valor

Desiderio P. Suson was a Philippine Constabulary enlisted trooper and a recipient the Philippines' highest military award for courage, the Medal of Valor. Suson was assigned as the commander of a 14-man Philippine Constabulary detachment in Gamay, Northern Samar on 31 October 1980 when they came under attack from approximately 300 New People's Army rebels. Suson and all his men were wounded.

Suson retired from the Armed Forces of the Philippines with the rank of Captain.

== Medal of Valor citation ==
"By direction of the President, pursuant to paragraph 3a, Section I, Armed Forces of the Philippines Regulations G 131-052, this Headquarters, dated 24 April 1967, the MEDAL FOR VALOR is hereby awarded to:

Technical Sergeant Desiderio P Suson 575127
Philippine Constabulary

"for conspicuous gallantry and intrepidity at the risk of life above and beyond the call of duty as Commander of a 14-man Philippine Constabulary Detachment during a surprise attack on his unit by some 300 Communist terrorists at Barangay Bangon, Gamay, Northern Samar on 31 October 1980. Outnumbered by the enemy by a ratio of one to nineteen, all his men were wounded as a result of intensive firing from assorted enemy weapons and M79 rockets. Surrounded on all sides and with no way to escape, then Sergeant Suson ordered his men to make every shot count by aiming accurately, and to hold their ground at all cost. Sensing his men were momentarily paralyzed because of shock, he went leapfrogging from one foxhole to another to direct their fire. Despite the blood oozing from his wounds, he never lost composure. With indomitable courage, he crawled to his wounded comrades, encouraging them to carry on the fight to the end."
