= Hilario Estrella =

Philippine Army officer

Hilario A. Estrella
- Military career
- Allegiance: Philippines
- Branch: Army
- Rank: Colonel
- Service number: O-8007
- Commands: Charlie Company, 33rd Infantry Battalion, 1st Infantry Division
- Conflicts: Communist rebellion in the Philippines
- Awards: Medal of Valor

Hilario A. Estrella is a retired Philippine Army officer and a recipient the Philippines' highest military award for courage, the Medal of Valor.

Lieutenant Estrella was the commander of a company detachment belonging to the 1st Infantry Division in Bayog, Zamboanga del Sur, Philippines when it was attacked by 200 New People's Army rebels on 1 December 1984. The 32-man detachment held off the attackers for seven hours under Estrella's leadership. Ten of his men were killed and several were wounded, including Estrella. When the attackers withdrew, they left behind twenty-two dead, including three of their commanders.

In March 1987, Estrella was rehearsing for his Medal of Valor conferment at the Philippine Military Academy when a bomb placed on the roof of the grandstand the exercise was being held in exploded. The bomb was apparently meant to kill President Corazon Aquino who was to address the graduating class and confer military awards and decorations. Estrella suffered burns, while three other officers and a civilian died in the blast. Estrella's family believes that the bombing triggered the deterioration of his mental health. In January 2011, he was arrested after he took his family hostage in Quezon City. No charges were filed against him.

Estrella retired early with the rank of colonel.

== Medal of Valor citation ==
"By direction of the President, pursuant to paragraph 1-6a, Section II, Chapter I, Armed Forces of the Philippines regulations G 131-053, this, Headquarters, dated 1 July 1986, the MEDAL FOR VALOR is hereby awarded to:

FIRST LIEUTENANT HILARIO A ESTRELLA O-8007

PHILIPPINE ARMY

For conspicuous gallantry and intrepidity beyond the call of duty during a pre-dawn raid by about 200 heavily armed terrorists on Bubuan Detachment at the vicinity of Barangay Bubuan, Bayog, Zamboanga del Sur, on 1 December 1984, while serving as Detachment Commander of “C” Company, 33rd Infantry Battalion, 1st Infantry (TABAK) Division PA. The enemy launched a surprise attack by unleashing heavy volume of fires from high powered guns and grenade launchers into the two separate positions of the troopers. Immediately all the elements of the 32-man detachment took positions and engaged the raiders in a fierce gun battle. First Lieutenant Estrella, after assessing the situation, instructed his men to conserve ammunition and ordered them to hold their grounds at all costs. Amidst hail of bullets and explosions of grenades battering their positions, he moved from one place to another, with blood oozing from his wounds, shouting orders and encouraging his men to carry on the fight. When their M60 machine gun malfunctioned, he put it into operation, manned it himself and engaged the enemy. Having ten of his men already killed and several others wounded, he stood his ground. The attackers subjected the troopers to all kinds of offensive tactics and taunted them to surrender. Unfazed, First Lieutenant Estrella rallied his men and the fierce fire-fight lasted seven hours until the terrorists withdrew. At the scene of the encounter, they recovered 22 bodies of dead terrorists, including 3 commanders, 12 high-powered firearms, assorted ammunition and subversive documents. By this exceptional gallantry, First Lieutenant Estrella distinguished himself in combat, in keeping with the finest tradition of Filipino soldiery."

== Personal life ==
Estrella is married to Marilyn, an army nurse; they have a daughter, Abby.

== Notes ==
1.Lieutenant Estrella's Medal of Valor citation itself does not specifically mention the attackers being communist rebels, however, an additional reference is provided to the effect.
