= Robert Salvador =

Filipino soldier

- Military career
- Allegiance: Philippines
- Branch: Philippine Army
- Rank: Captain
- Service number: 723530
- Unit: 49th Infantry Battalion
- Conflicts: 1989 Philippine coup attempt
- Awards: Medal of Valor

Robert Salvador is a retired Philippine Army officer and a recipient the Philippines' highest military award for courage, the Medal of Valor.

Salvador, then a Private First Class, was one of the soldiers defending Camp Aguinaldo during the 1989 Philippine coup attempt. When armored personnel carriers of the rebel Reform the Armed Forces Movement rammed the camp's gate on 3 December 1989, Salvador fired on the vehicles with a 90 mm recoilless rifle, killing several crewmen inside. One of those killed turned out to be Salvador's brother, Rogelio.

Salvador had been promoted to Sergeant by the time he was conferred the Medal of Valor on March 22, 1991. He was a Captain by December 2016, just before his retirement.

== Medal of Valor citation ==
PRIVATE FIRST CLASS ROBERT F SALVADOR 723530 PA
LOGCOM, CGEA, Quezon City – 3 December 1989

"For conspicuous gallantry and intrepidity at the risk of life beyond the call of duty during the failed coup attempt staged by the rebel soldiers on 3 December 1989.

Upon orders by the Commanding Officer, 49th Infantry Battalion, which was then defending the AFP Logistics Command area, PRIVATE FIRST CLASS SALVADOR, armed with 90 mm recoiless [sic] rifle, tracked down a fleeing enemy V-150 Command Tank amidst heavy enemy gunfire and directly fired at it, hitting the rear and right tire, partially disabling it. His second shot totally destroyed the rebel- driven armor. Minutes later, a second armoured tank arrived along Santolan Road. Apparently dispatched for a rescue and reinforcement mission, the landing vehicle bombarded the strong defensive position of the 49th Infantry Battalion. With this situation, PRIVATE FIRST CLASS SALVADOR surreptitiously advanced towards the hostile tank and blew it thoroughly with his recoiless [sic] rifle. His heroic effort disorganized the hostile forces and caused them to cease their attack and withdraw. The successful defence of the Battalion at LOGCOM proved to be the most decisive defeat incurred by the rebel soldiers in their all-out effort to capture the General Headquarters. This prevented the hostile forces to penetrate the inner defense of Camp Aguinaldo and to seize the ammunition depot of LOGCOM. Such victory was attributed to the selfless heroism of this intrepid soldier.

By this display of extraordinary gallantry, PRIVATE FIRST CLASS SALVADOR distinguished himself in the field of combat in keeping with the highest tradition of Filipino soldiery."
