= Jose Bandong Jr. =

Jose Bandong, Jr.
- Military career
- Allegiance: Philippines
- Branch: Philippine Army
- Rank: Second Lieutenant
- Service number: O-125034
- Units: Delta Company, 24th Infantry Battalion, 7th Infantry Division
- Conflicts: Communist rebellion in the Philippines
- Awards: Medal of Valor

Jose E. Bandong, Jr. was a Philippine Army officer and a posthumous recipient of the Philippines' highest military award for courage, the Medal of Valor.

== Firefight against the New People's Army ==
Bandong was serving as a platoon leader in Delta Company of the 24th Infantry Battalion when the soldiers under his command initially overwhelmed approximately 20 New People's Army guerrillas after a 20-minute firefight in the boundaries of Sagada and Bontoc in Mountain Province, Philippines on 10 April 1992. The communist rebels were forced to withdraw. As Bandong's unit was preparing to exfiltrate the area, another unit which was tasked with securing the exit route was ambushed as they approached a hill by about 30 NPAs. The ensuing firefight lasted three hours and the soldiers called for reinforcements.

Bandong led his men to the relief of the ambushed unit, but as they did so, his men were in turn attacked from the rear by another group of communist guerrillas. Bandong was wounded in the left shoulder, and seeing that the enemy had superior numbers, he ordered his men to withdraw. He then covered their withdrawal. Bandong was killed in action. Although not mentioned in the official citation of his posthumously-conferred Medal of Valor, it has been repeatedly told by officers and soldiers that Bandong's final call to troops manning artillery was "Fire on my position".

Bandong's seemingly improbable call for artillery to "fire on my position" was referenced during an inquiry by Philippine Congress into the 2015 Mamasapano clash where 44 Special Action Force policemen were killed.

== Medal of Valor citation ==
SECOND LIEUTENANT JOSE E BANDONG JR O-125034 PA

Bontoc, Mt. Province - 10 April 1992

"For acts of conspicuous courage, gallantry and intrepidity above and beyond the call of duty while serving as a Platoon Leader of delta Company, 24th Infantry Battalion, 7th Infantry Division, Philippine Army during the Unit’s encounter with about 80 heavily armed NPA terrorists belonging to the Chadli Molintas Command-Regional Unit Guerrilla (CMC-RYG) at vicinity Hills 1946 and 1923 in the boundaries of Sagada and Bontoc Mt Province.

Confronted by a numerically superior enemy, subject Officer maneuvered his platoon and ferociously fought the enemy for more than six hours. Initially moving towards intermediate objective at Hill 1946 GS 7898, his platoon surprised an estimated 20 NPA terrorists whom they engaged in a 20 minute fire fight until the enemy withdrew.

Search on the scene of encounter accounted for three enemies killed and two M16 rifles recovered. While his Platoon was preparing for evacuation, one team moved ahead towards the Southwest to secure the route but while approaching Hill 1923 GS 7896, the team was ambushed by an estimated 30 rebels. The team engaged the enemy for three hours despite their inferior number. Unsure of the fate of the leading team, SECOND LIEUTENANT BANDONG JR led the reinforcement to link up with the team but while in the process, his reinforcing team was engaged by a separate enemy group from the rear. Another, team guarding the rear quickly positioned themselves and fought back but the enemy from the rear was superior in number. Immediately he ordered perimeter defense and continued to encourage his troops to fight. Overwhelmed by the superior enemy strength and already critically wounded on his left shoulder, SECOND LIEUTENANT BANDONG JR ordered his men to withdraw leaving him and those killed in action behind. Unmindful of his wounds and of his personal safety, he chose to continue engaging the enemy up to his last bullet, thus delaying the enemy advance and allowing his troops to withdraw. This ultimately saved the lives of other government troopers especially those who were wounded in action.

By this display of heroism SECOND LIEUTENANT BANDONG JR upheld the highest virtue of military leadership and professionalism, thus earning distinct credit for himself and the Armed Forces of the Philippines."

== Commemoration ==
Lt. Bandong is buried at the Libingan ng mga Bayani in Metro Manila. The hill on which he died is now called Bandong Hill in his honor.

== See also ==
- John R. Fox
