= Herbert Dilag =

Philippine Military Officer

Herbert D. Dilag
- Born: Kalinga, Philippines
- Military career
- Allegiance: Philippines
- Branch: Philippine Army
- Rank: Colonel
- Service number: 0-12640
- Units: 11th Scout Ranger Company, 1st Scout Ranger Battalion, 1st Scout Ranger Regiment
- Conflicts: Moro conflict
- Awards: Medal of Valor

Herbert D. Dilag is a Philippine Army officer and a recipient the Philippines' highest military award for courage, the Medal of Valor. He is a member of the Igorot people, an ethnic group that inhabits the provinces of the Cordillera Administrative Region in the Philippines.

== Military education ==
Dilag is a graduate of the Philippine Military Academy Class of 1998.

== Action against the Abu Sayyaf ==
In March 2000, Abu Sayyaf militants abducted approximately 28-29 civilians including schoolchildren, the Catholic Claretian missionary Fr. Rhoel Gallardo, and two teachers in Basilan. Dilag was part of a Scout Ranger unit under the command of Major Roberto Caldeo tasked with pursuing the kidnappers and rescuing the hostages. On 28 April 2000, Dilag's unit assaulted the Abu Sayyaf camp where the hostages were being held. The Scout Rangers were able to surprise the Abu Sayyaf militants but due to advantage in terrain, the militants were able to pin down the government security forces and hold their ground.

On the third day of the operation, Caldeo decided that two squads of Scout Rangers would have to volunteer and make an all-out assault up the steep terrain to clear out the bunkers keeping the rest of the government forces pinned down. Dilag led one of the "suicide squads". After four hours of intense fighting, they managed to clear the bunkers as the Abu Sayyaf retreated. Recovered were the beheaded bodies of the two hostaged teachers.

Dilag was conferred the Medal of Valor for his actions during the battle. Roberto Caldeo, who had by then been promoted to colonel, committed suicide in April 2008; allegedly due to stress suffered as a result of the operation that killed six of his men.

Dilag made the following statement, in Filipino, upon receiving the Medal of Valor: "We woke up at 2:00am, then we took off. We hadn't slept and it was raining. Our progress was slow due to the thick jungle growth. When we engaged the enemy, we had to use one hand to hold unto tree roots, while the other hand fired the weapon. For 24 hours we withstood the steep terrain, hunger, tension and fatigue. Then you would hear the groans of your wounded comrades saying, 'Sir, let's retreat', 'I'm suffering blood loss', 'My wounds hurt', 'Will I live sir?', words to that effect. You will then discover that you do have an untapped reservoir of courage."

=== Medal of Valor citation ===
SECOND LIEUTENANT HERBERT D DILAG O-12640 PHILIPPINE ARMY
Isabela, Basilan - 30 April 2000

"For acts of conspicuous courage, gallantry and intrepidity above and beyond the call of duty while serving as the Squad Leader of a "Suicide Squad" of the First Scout Ranger Battalion, First Scout Ranger Regiment, Special Operations Command, Philippine Army, during the 3-day assault of Hill 898, Camp Abdurrajak, Punoh Mihaji, Isabela, Basilan on 28 to 30 April 2000.

With the commencement of the 103rd Brigade's OPLAN "FINAL OPTION", the First Scout Ranger Battalion was directed to attack the highly fortified enemy positions being occupied by more or less 210 fully armed members of the Abu Sayyaf Group who were then holding in captivity 28 civilian hostages. The 11th Scout Ranger Company spearheaded the attack with the team under SECOND LIEUTENANT DILAG, taking the lead. After a grueling trek along the 7-kilometer highly restrictive terrain and after bypassing 48 enemy improvised landmines, the troops were able to close-in on the northeastern portion of the enemy camp.

On 280930 April 2000, the 1st Scout Ranger Battalion began the assault and a heavy firefight ensued. Though initially surprised the enemy was able to take advantage of its commanding position and confronted the government forces with stiff resistance. At 1630H, the enemy counterattacked in full force, killing 4 Scout Rangers and wounding 27 others. In spite of the numerous casualties and heavy enemy volume of fires coming from cal. 50 Machineguns, 57RRs and the continuous explosion of grenades and dynamites near their positions, the leading elements under SECOND LIEUTENANT DILAG, fearlessly retaliated with accurate sniper fires which prevented the enemy from closing-in.

Notwithstanding the heavy rains, hunger, tension and fatigue, and despite numerous casualties, the Scout Rangers held on their ground and engaged the enemy with strong determination and ferocity for the next 24 hours. On 300530 April 2000, after sensing the seemingly insurmountable odds, Major Caldeo, the Commanding Officer of the 1st scout Ranger Battalion, decided to execute the final assault with the organization of 2 "Suicide Squads". The squad, consisting of 14 volunteers, were tasked to perform an extremely risky mission of clearing the northeastern bunkers.

Uncertain of what will happen to them, the members of the squad, left their valuables to their supporting comrades to be further given to their loved ones, in anticipation of their deaths. Undaunted by threat posed by the situation and unmindful of their own safety, the squads, headed by Second Lieutenant Dilag and Second Lieutenant Gonaales rushed-up the 80-meter, 80-degree slope and eventually assaulted the heavily fortified enemy defensive positions then carried out an intense bunker to bunker battle.

With cunning stealth, the "Suicide Squads" were able to secure the northeastern tip of Hill 898 which was being defended by Khadafy Janjalani's group. This heroic and gallant act paved the way for the subsequent clearing of the remaining 3 clusters of enemy fortified defensive positions. After 4 hours of close combat, the squads forced the enemy to withdraw towards the western direction. The 3 day intense firefight resulted to the killing of 7 members of the Abu Sayyaf Group, the recovery of 1 B40 RPG, 1 M653 and M16 rifles, the unearthing of 2 beheaded hostages and the destruction of a seemingly invincible enemy.

By this display of exceptional courage and a high degree of leadership, SECOND LIEUTENANT DILAG distinguished himself in combat, in keeping the finest tradition of Filipino Soldiery."

== Personal life ==
Herbert Dilag is married to Daisy Lady Dilag; they have three children.

== See also ==
- Lucio Curig
