= Isaias Silvestre Jr. =

Isaias V. Silvestre Jr.
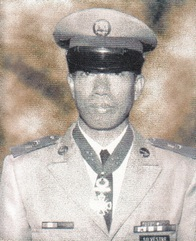
- Military career
- Allegiance: Philippines
- Branch: Philippine Constabulary
- Rank: Master Sergeant
- Service number: 562785
- Unit: 433rd Philippine Constabulary Company
- Conflicts: Communist rebellion in the Philippines
- Awards: Philippine Medal of Valor

Isaias V. Silvestre Jr. is a retired Philippine Constabulary enlisted trooper and a recipient the Philippines' highest military award for courage, the Medal of Valor. Silvestre was assigned as the non-Commissioned Officer-in-charge of the Calapagan Patrol Base in Lupon, Davao Oriental on 14 May 1985 when the base came under attack from approximately 170 heavily armed rebels. Silvestre and eleven other men of the 433rd Philippine Constabulary Company were wounded in the attack. Silvestre personally killed six rebels including a certain Commander Mortar.

== Medal of Valor citation ==
"By direction of the President, pursuant to paragraph 3a, Section I, Armed Forces of the Philippines Regulations G 131-052, this Headquarters, dated 24 April 1987, the MEDAL FOR VALOR is hereby awarded to:

Master Sergeant Isaias V Silvestre Jr 562785

Philippine Constabulary

"for conspicuous gallantry and intrepidity at the risk of life, above and beyond the call of duty during an attack by about 170 heavily armed subversive terrorists at the Calapagan Patrol Base of the 433rd Philippine Constabulary Company Stationed at the Calampang, Lupon, Davao Oriental on 14 May 1985. It was near daybreak when heavily armed subversive terrorists, some carrying mortars and M-79 grenade launchers, stealthily surrounded the patrol base and upon reaching vantage positions simultaneously fired their weapons at the surprised troopers killing two sentinels on post during the initial burst of gunfire. Undaunted by the numerical and firepower superiority of the enemy, Master Sergeant Silvestre immediately deployed his handful of men, directing them to defend the base at all costs and ordering his radio operator to inform the Company Headquarters about the situation. As mortal shells and M-79 missiles rained on the base, accompanied by uninterrupted firing of the terrorists, 12 members of the base including Master Sergeant Silvestre were wounded. Disregarding multiple shrapnel wounds I his back and bullets blazing from all directions, he courageously crawled from foxhole ton foxhole, firing his M-16 rifle towards the enemy and shouting encouraging words to his men, urging them to fight decisively the terrorists who were gradually advancing and threatening to overrun the base. Although outnumbered 8 to 1, the beleaguered troops fought with intense ferocity, while their leader, with his exceptional marksmanship, fatally shot one by one the other terrorists as they crawled towards the patrol base. Although wounded, he accounted for six terrorists including Commander Mortar, the leader of the terrorists whom he shot in the forehead at the time when the subversive terrorist leader was calling on the troopers through a megaphone to surrender. Again he fell another terrorist who attempted to use the megaphone. With their leader dead, the enemy became demoralized. Fighting continued for another hour until the enemy finally withdrew through the nearby forested area, dragging some of their killed and wounded comrades. When the smoke of battle cleared, 21dead terrorists, two M-79s, two BARs, six M-16 rifles, ten U.S. Garand rifles, one megaphone, assorted empty magazines and subversive documents were recovered around the base perimeter. Thirty five other terrorists were confirmed later to have died during the fierce encounter. By this display of extraordinary gallantry, Master Sergeant Silvestre Jr contributed immeasurably towards the continued success of the campaign against subversive terrorism in the country, thereby distinguishing himself in the field of combat in keeping with the best traditions of Filipino soldiery."
