= Claudio Forrosuelo =

- Born: Tagum, Philippines
- Died: 3 May 2000; Matanog, Maguindanao
- Military career
- Allegiance: Philippines
- Branch: Philippine Army
- Rank: Technical Sergeant
- Service number: 737647
- Units: 8th Scout Ranger Company, 2nd Scout Ranger Battalion, 1st Scout Ranger Regiment
- Conflicts: Moro conflict 2000 Philippine campaign against the Moro Islamic Liberation Front
- Awards: Medal of Valor

Claudio Forrosuelo was a Philippine Army enlisted trooper and a posthumous recipient of the Philippines' highest military award for courage, the Medal of Valor.

== Action against Moro secessionists ==
Sergeant Forrosuelo was a member of the 8th Scout Ranger Company of the Philippine Army which saw combat during the 6-month campaign of the Armed Forces of the Philippines against the secessionist Moro Islamic Liberation Front in 2000. Forrosuelo's 80-man unit engaged a force of MILF rebels numbering approximately 500 fighters in Matanog, Maguindanao on 3 May 2000.

Pinned down by enemy fire and incurring numerous casualties, the government security forces were almost out-flanked. Forrosuelo led an assault on the well-entrenched MILF forces that allowed the evacuation of the wounded soldiers. He then elected to stay behind and along with five others, delayed the enemy counter-attack. He was killed in action. Forrosuelo was conferred the Medal of Valor in 2001.

== Personal life ==
Sergeant Forrosuelo's youngest child Precious Jewel Forrosuelo was 8 years old at the time of his death. She graduated from the Philippine Military Academy in March 2014, making history as the first ever offspring of a Medal of Valor awardee to graduate from the PMA. A week after her graduation, she was commissioned a Second Lieutenant in the Philippine Army.

== Commemoration ==
In August 2016, the legislative body of Tagum, Davao del Norte, Forrosuelo's birthplace, adopted a resolution granting him a posthumous award for the same actions that earned him the Medal of Valor.
