= Lucio Curig =

Philippine army trooper

Lucio P. Curig
- Born: February 8, 1963 (age 63); Dinas, Zamboanga Del Sur, Philippines
- Military career
- Allegiance: Philippines
- Branch: Philippine Army
- Service years: 1980-2015
- Rank: Staff Sergeant
- Service number: 704115
- Units: 11th Scout Ranger Company, 1st Scout Ranger Regiment
- Conflicts: Moro conflict
- Awards: Medal of Valor

Lucio P. Curig is a retired Philippine Army enlisted trooper and a recipient of the Philippines' highest military award for courage: the Medal of Valor.

== Action against the Abu Sayyaf ==
In March 2000, Abu Sayyaf militants in Basilan abducted approximately 28-29 civilians, including schoolchildren, a Catholic priest, and two teachers. Curig was part of a Scout Ranger unit under the command of Major Roberto Caldeo tasked with pursuing the kidnappers and rescuing the hostages. On 28 April 2000, Curig's unit assaulted the Abu Sayyaf camp where the hostages were being held. The Scout Rangers were able to surprise the militants but due to advantage in terrain, the militants were able to pin down the government security forces and hold their ground.

On the third day of the operation, Caldeo decided that two squads of Scout Rangers would have to volunteer and make an all-out assault up the steep terrain to clear out the bunkers keeping the rest of the government forces pinned down. Curig volunteered for one of the "suicide squads". After four hours of intense fighting, they managed to clear the bunkers as the Abu Sayyaf retreated. Recovered were the beheaded bodies of the two hostage teachers.

Curig was conferred the Medal of Valor for his actions during the battle. Roberto Caldeo, who had by then been promoted to colonel, committed suicide in April 2008; allegedly due to stress suffered as a result of the operation that killed six of his men.

=== Curig's point of view ===
Curig reveals in a video-recorded interview that the Philippine Army unit that embarked on the operation to rescue the hostages was battalion-sized, consisting of three companies. The Abu Sayyaf, led by Abu Sabaya, were encamped on elevated terrain, and the army soldiers elected to approach the camp via a route that was almost 90 degrees steep, hoping to achieve surprise.

Upon reaching a level area near the Abu Sayyaf bunkers, the soldiers came under fire from trenches dug in front of the bunkers. The army soldiers began to take casualties until the first two companies of the main assault effort were forced to withdraw. Curig, who was assigned in the reserve company, slowly made his way up the hill and managed to position himself where he could observe the Abu Sayyaf trenches. From there, he began to snipe at the Abu Sayyaf.

His effectiveness at this began to tell when the Abu Sayyaf started concentrating their fire at his position. However, he remained there and continued shooting at the enemy, fearing that if the Abu Sayyaf managed to overrun his position, there would be no one else between the enemy, his battalion commander a bit lower down the slope, and the casualties at the collection point at the bottom of the hill. He stayed there alone, as all his other companions had been wounded, for almost three days. The Abu Sayyaf attempted multiple times to assault his position, but could not do so due to his effective fire. Neither could the army soldiers assault the bunkers due to the Abu Sayyaf's heavy supporting fire from the neighboring hills.

The stalemate ended when it was realized that the army helicopters could not land at the bottom of the hill to evacuate the dead and wounded. The only possible landing area would be the top of the hill occupied by the Abu Sayyaf. It was at that point that Major Caldeo ordered the "suicide assault".

== Medal of Valor citation ==
STAFF SERGEANT LUCIO G CURIG 704115 PA
Isabela, Basilan - 28–30 April 2000

"From 28 to 30 April 2000, the 11th Scout ranger Company (SRC) Team, assaulted Hill 898 in Camp Abdurajak, the highly fortified Abu Sayyaf lair where 28 civilians were being held hostage in Punoh Mohaji, Sumisip Basilan. Heavy fire fight ensued as the enemy confronted the soldiers with a counterattack, killing four rangers and wounding 20 others. Despite the casualties and heavy volume of enemy fire, SSGT CURIG stood his ground by digging his foxhole 20 meters away from the Abu Sayyaf from where, for the next 24 hours, he delivered sniper fire hitting the enemy who tried to overrun the leftmost position of the 11th SRC. He provided cover fire for his officers and wounded comrades, thereby giving them the opportunity to move to safer grounds and prevented the enemy from closing in. After another day of intense, determined and fierce fighting, SSGT CURIG and 13 other rangers volunteered for and organized a "suicide squad" to execute the final assault. Thoroughly exhausted yet unmindful of losing their lives, they rushed towards the enemy's fortified defenses and carried out an intense bunker-to-bunker close battle. With overwhelming force, SSGT CURIG and his comrades secured the whole north eastern tip sector defended by Khadafy Janjalani's group and paved the way for the subsequent clearing of the remaining cluster of the Abu Sayyaf's fortifications and forced the bandits to withdraw."

== See also ==
- Herbert Dilag
