= Bienvenido Fajemolin =

- Military career
- Allegiance: Philippines
- Branch: Philippine Army
- Rank: Sergeant
- Service number: 626359
- Units: 3rd Platoon, Charlie Company; 36th Infantry Battalion, 4th Infantry Division
- Conflicts: Communist rebellion in the Philippines; Moro conflict
- Awards: Medal of Valor

Bienvenido Fajemolin is a retired Philippine Army enlisted trooper and a recipient the Philippines' highest military award for courage, the Medal of Valor.

Fajemolin was serving as platoon sergeant in Sibuco, Zamboanga del Norte, Philippines on 18 October 1977 when his company headquarters came under attack by approximately 500 rebels. With the unit's officers out on official business, Fajemolin assumed command. Although wounded, he managed to hold off the attack for five hours, after which the rebels withdrew, leaving sixteen of their number dead. Fajemolin was conferred the Medal of Valor three years later.

== Medal of Valor citation ==
"By direction of the President, pursuant to paragraph 3a, Section I, Armed Forces of the Philippines Regulations G 131-052, this Headquarters, dated 24 April 1967, as amended, the MEDAL FOR VALOR is hereby awarded to:

Sergeant Bienvenido Fajemolin 626359 Philippine Army

for outstanding courage, conspicuous gallantry, intrepidity and presence of mind in the face of a strong rebel attack on 180530 to 181400 October 1977 at Kawit-Kawit, Sibuco, Zamboanga del Norte, while serving as a platoon sergeant of 3rd Platoon, Charlie Company. 36th Infantry Battalion, 4th Infantry Division, Philippine Army. In the early morning of 18 October 1977, the Headquarters of Charlie Company was attacked by insurgents with an estimated strength of 500 men. Being aware, at the height of the assault, that the Company Commander and Company Officers were out on official business, and the brunt of the attack was on the company headquarters, then Private First Class Fajemolin braved sniper fires and assumed command of the whole company at the position. Although wounded, he rallied the demoralized and badly hit group defending the headquarters, reorganized the defensive positions, and evacuated the wounded and the dead to safe areas. Sensing the intention of the rebels to capture the company command post, he ordered and supervised a limited but skillfully executed maneuver, throwing the insurgents off-balance and confused as to the actual strength of the group defending the positions. He engaged them in hit and run tactics in short-ranged firefight, with occasional attempts to assault and maneuver into rebel-held terrain. He held the attack for five hours until the insurgents disengaged and withdrew from the scene, with 16 killed and 10 Garand rifles and one gauge-12 shotgun lost. He immediately consolidated his company position, attended to the wounded redistributed his dwindling ammunition supply and waited for reinforcements to arrive and relieve his group. By his display of exceptional courage and high degree of leadership, Sergeant Fajemolin kept up to the highest traditions of Filipino soldiery and earned honor and glory for himself, the Philippine Army and the Armed Forces of the Philippines."

== Notes ==
1.Sergeant Fajemolin's Medal of Valor citation does not specify whether the attackers were Moro or communist rebels.
