= Emigdio C. Cruz =

- Born: 5 August 1898; Arayat, Pampanga, Captaincy General of the Philippines
- Died: 1978
- Military career
- Allegiance: Philippines
- Branch: Philippine Army
- Service years: 1939-1946
- Rank: Lieutenant Colonel
- Service number: 0-520476
- Units: Philippine Army Medical Corps; Philippine resistance against Japan
- Conflicts: Pacific War, World War II
- Awards: Philippine Medal of Valor

Emigdio Castor Cruz was a Philippine Army officer and a recipient the Philippines' highest military award for courage, the Medal of Valor. Cruz was the personal physician of Manuel Quezon. After accompanying the Philippine President to the United States at the onset of the War in the Pacific, Cruz was sent back to the Philippines by Douglas MacArthur in order to establish contact with Filipino and American guerrillas fighting the Imperial Japanese forces occupying the country.

== Medal of Valor citation ==
"Major Emigdio C Cruz (0520467) Philippine Army, in active service in the Army of the United States

for exceptional heroism beyond the call of duty in action on a secret mission from Washington to Australia and to the Philippines, from May 3, 1943 to February 28, 1944, the Medal for Valor is awarded to Major Emigdio C. Cruz, Philippine Army, in the active service of the Army of the United States. Major Cruz volunteered for the hazardous mission of entering the Philippines and obtaining information there of the great importance to the Government of the Commonwealth and the Southwest Pacific Command. His capture by the enemy would have meant torture and certain death. He landed in Negros, traveled by various means and under various guises to Manila and returned to Australia and thence to Washington, with his mission fully and satisfactorily accomplished. In accomplishing this dangerous mission, Major Cruz showed daring resourcefulness and long sustained courage."
