= Francisco Gómez Camacho =

Spanish Jesuit priest (1939–2024)

Francisco Gómez Camacho (26 April 1939 – 5 February 2024) was a Spanish Jesuit priest and academic who was Professor of Economics at the Comillas Pontifical University in Madrid. He died on 5 February 2024, at the age of 84.

== Fields of research ==
Gómez Camacho often lectured and published on late Scholastic economic thought. He published several articles about Luis de Molina, the sixteenth-century Jesuit known for liberal economic ethics and an emphasis on natural law. Even after retirement, Gómez Camacho continued to hold seminars.

== Plagiarism ==
Three of Gómez Camacho's publications have been retracted due to plagiarism. In an article published in 2005, he copied "a number of direct, substantial, and nearly verbatim sections" from Marjorie Grice-Hutchinson’s book, The School of Salamanca.

A second incident involved a plagiarized book chapter, which the publisher Brill retracted, noting that it was necessary "because of serious citation problems (in some cases the original sources are not mentioned at all). It goes without saying that Brill strongly disapproves of such practices, which represent a serious breach of publication integrity."

A chapter in another book, one published in 2007, addressing well-known historical figures such as Francisco de Vitoria and Domingo de Soto, has been cited in several discussions of scholastic economic thought. Because of plagiarism, the publisher Rowman and Littlefield suspended sales of the volume. It is nearly identical to the 2005 article retracted for plagiarizing Grice-Hutchinson.

=== Three retracted publications ===
- Francisco Gómez Camacho, “Introduction: Luis de Molina, S.J.: Life, Studies, and Teaching,” Journal of Markets & Morality 8.1 (2005): 167–198.
- Francisco Gómez Camacho, “Later Scholastics: Spanish Economic Thought in the XVIth and XVIIth Centuries,” in Ancient and Medieval Economic Ideas and Concepts of Social Justice, ed. S. Todd Lowry and Barry Gordon (Leiden: Brill, 1998), 503–561.
- Francisco Gómez Camacho, “Introduction: Luis de Molina, S.J.: Life, Studies, and Teaching,” in Sourcebook in Late-Scholastic Monetary Theory, ed. Stephen J. Grabill (Lanham, MD: Lexington Books / Rowman & Littlefield, 2007), 111–135.

== Selection of further publications ==
- Trabajo y capital en el 3. Plan de Desarrollo. 1972.
- Sugerencias para un análisis formal de la dependencia económica, in: Apuntes: Revista de Ciencias Sociales 4 (1975): pp. 35–57.
- Réplicas: Distribución del ingreso en el Perú. A propósito del libro de R. Webb y A. Figueroa (Universidad del Pacífico. Centro de Investigación 1977-01)
- La "estimación común" en la teoría molinista del justo precio. 1978.
- "Expectativas económicas" y solidaridad social en la teoría molinista del justo precio. Madrid: Instituto Francisco Suárez del C.S.I.C. ISBN 84-00-04754-0. OCLC 733870238.
- La teoria del justo precio. 1981.
- Cumplimiento y desarrollo de la ley natural. 1985.
- La teoría monetaria de los doctores españoles del siglo XVI. 1985.
- Luis de Molina y la metodología de la ley natural. 1985.
- Tratado sobre los prestamos y la usura; Inst. de Cooperación Iberoamericana u.a. 1989.
- Tratado sobre los cambios; Inst. de Cooperación Iberoamericana u.a. 1991.
- Economía y filosofía moral : la formación del pensamiento económico europeo de la Escolástica española. Madrid: Síntesis. ISBN 84-7738-531-9. OCLC 39202737.
- El pensamiento económico en la Escuela de Salamanca : una visión multidisciplinar : seminarios celebrados en Salamanca en 1992, 1993, y 1995. Ernest Lluch, F. Gómez Camacho, Ricardo Robledo Hernández, Fundación Duques de Soria. Salamanca, España: Fundación Duques de Soria. 1998. ISBN 84-7800-087-9. OCLC 42682644.
- De economía y pensamiento económico : homenaje al Prof. Dr. Juan Velarde Fuertes. Juan Velarde Fuertes, María Teresa Mera Vázquez, F. Gómez Camacho. Madrid: Universidad Pontificia Comillas. 2001. ISBN 84-8468-025-8. OCLC 60492129.
- Espacio y tiempo en la Escuela de Salamanca : (el tratado de J. de Lugo, S.J., "Sobre la composición del continuo") (1a. ed ed.). Salamanca: Universidad de Salamanca. ISBN 84-7800-635-4. OCLC 432855057
- Tratos y contratos de mercaderes y tratantes discididos y determinados, por el padre presentado Fray Thomas de Mercado, de la Orden de los Predicadores; Ediciones Universidad de Salamanca. 2015. ISBN 978-84-9012-564-9. English version: Three essays on the times and work of Tomás Mercado; Ediciones Universidad de Salamanca. 2018.
