= Emigi =

Emigi Chokhun
- Village
- Location within Iran
- Coordinates: 26°18′14″N 57°40′16″E
- Country: Iran
- Province: Hormozgan
- County: Bashagard
- Bakhsh: Central
- Rural District: Jakdan

Population (2006)
  - Total: 484
- Time zone: UTC+3:30 (IRST)
  - Summer (DST): UTC+4:30 (IRDT)

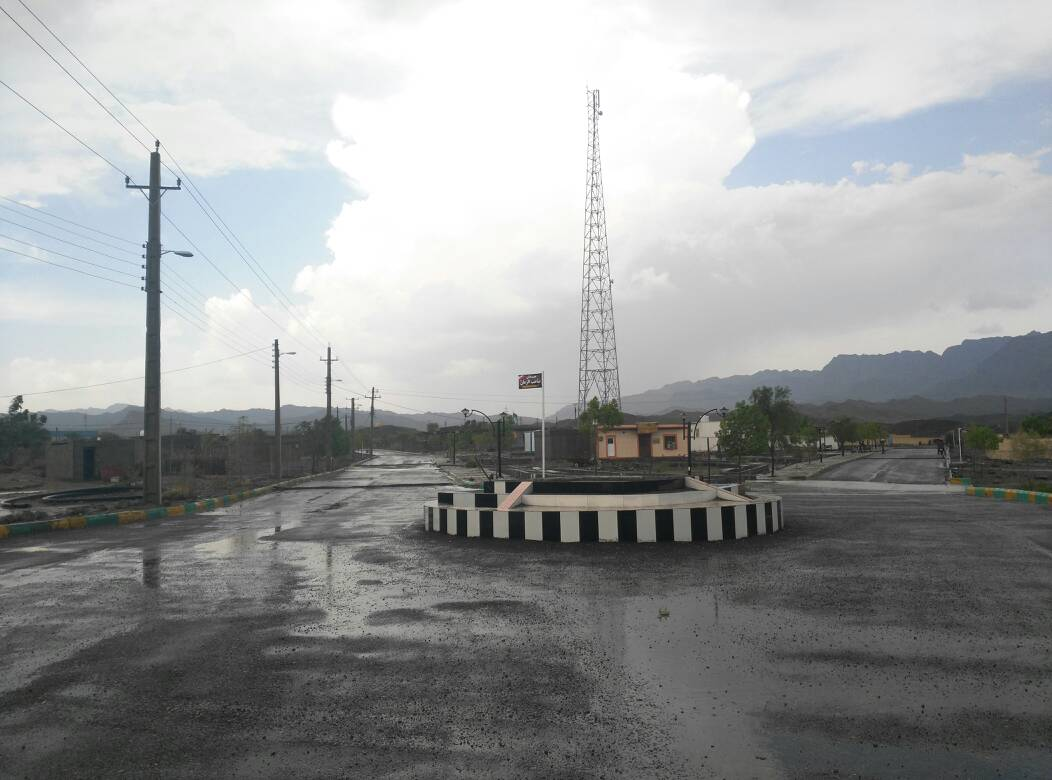

Emigi (Persian: اميگي, also Romanized as Emīgī; also known as Chūkhūn) is a village in Jakdan Rural District, in the Central District of Bashagard County, Hormozgan Province, Iran. At the 2006 census, its population was 484, in 120 families.
