= Noel S. Buan =

Filipino army officer

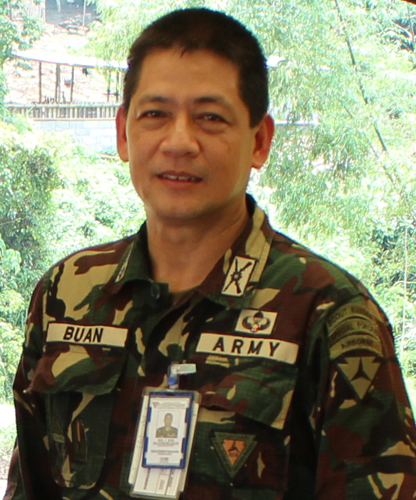
- Buan as a Colonel in 2015
- Born: Arayat Pampanga, Philippines
- Military career
- Allegiance: Philippines
- Branch: Philippine Army
- Service years: 1984 – 2018
- Rank: Brigadier General
- Service number: 0-9140
- Units: AFP Reserve Command; Materiel Development; Reservist and Retiree Affairs; 1st Scout Ranger Regiment; AFP Southern Luzon Command
- Conflicts: Communist rebellion in the Philippines; Islamic insurgency in the Philippines
- Awards: Philippine Medal of Valor

Noel S. Buan is a retired Philippine Army general officer and a recipient the Philippines' highest military award for courage – the Medal of Valor. Buan was captured and held by the communist New People's Army in July 1999 while serving as an intelligence officer with the Armed Forces of the Philippines Southern Luzon Command. He was released after 21 months of captivity in April 2001. In 2004, while serving as commander of the 1st Scout Ranger Battalion in Basilan, Buan orchestrated a military operation that resulted in the deaths of Abu Sayyaf leader Hamsiraji Marusi Sali and his brother Sahir.

Buan retired from the service in April 2018.

== Early life and education ==
Buan is a graduate of the Philippine Military Academy's Class of 1984.

== Career ==
=== Capture by New People's Army ===
On November 8, 1999, then-Major Buan was abducted by the Melito Glor Command of the New People's Army while serving as an intelligence officer with the AFP Southern Luzon Command in Quezon. It was believed that he was targeted for capture due to the nature of his military duties and that he had sensitive information regarding the revolutionary movement.

Buan was released after 21 months in captivity on April 6, 2001, in Oriental Mindoro. Gregorio "Ka Roger" Rosal, NPA spokesman, stated that Buan was steadfast in captivity and even managed to escape and evade his captors for 12 hours in December 2000. However, due to weakness, he was unable to make good his escape. Despite this, reports of his going over to the rebel side were aired, and he was debriefed after his release. Buan subsequently returned to active military service.

=== Action against the Abu Sayyaf ===
Hamsiraji Sali

On April 8, 2004, Buan, commanding the 1st Scout Ranger Battalion as a lieutenant colonel in Basilan, figured in a firefight with Abu Sayyaf leader Hamsiraji Sali and six others including Sali's younger brother Sahir, also called Yashier Sali. Hamsiraji Sali was implicated in the kidnapping of an American Jeffrey Schilling, the 2001 Dos Palmas kidnappings and had a $1M bounty on his head. All six Abu Sayyaf members were killed. Buan's troops suffered one killed and four wounded, including Buan himself.

Buan and one of his men, Staff Sergeant Leopoldo Diokno, were awarded Gold Cross medals, which were later upgraded to Distinguished Conduct Stars. In what would prove to be a controversial move, these medals were later further upgraded to the Medal of Valor, which was approved by then-Philippine President Gloria Macapagal Arroyo.

=== Medal of Valor citation ===
LIEUTENANT COLONEL NOEL S BUAN O-9140
Basilan Province – 4 August 2004

"For acts of conspicuous courage, gallantry and intrepidity at the risk of life above and beyond the call of duty during a one hour and half- encounter against undetermined number of Abu Sayyaf terrorists under Commander HAMSIRAJI SALI at Barangay Makiri in Lantawan, Basilan Province on 08 April 2004.

While serving as team leader of the assaulting elements of the First Scout Ranger Battalion, First Scout Ranger Regiment, Special Operations Command, Philippine Army. With his group, Commander SALI, including his brother Sahir SALI, was one of the most wanted terrorists groups sought by the Republic of the Philippines and the United States of America due to involvement in the series of violent and heinous atrocities. Aware of the dangers of becoming a possible hostage victim himself, LIEUTENANT COLONEL BUAN took the risk of putting his life as a bait in order that Commander Hamsiraji SALI and his group will engage them. His innovation paid off after they were able to locate the specific location and even had the chance to talk to the enemies face-to-face that resulted in a close quarter battle. He personally engaged the group of Hamsiraji SALI in hand-to-hand combat. Despite the terrorists overwhelming advantages, LIEUTENANT COLONEL BUAN succeeded in reversing the situation by directing his men to aggressively engage and assault at all costs and to hold the line. This he did despite the wound on his right hand.

This display of exceptional courage motivated his men, including those wounded, to fight on. Unmindful of his personal safety, he rallied and stayed in the encounter site and supervised the administration of first aid and recovery of high powered fire arms. He did not leave the area until he was sure that the last wounded soldier was withdrawn and the dead bodies of Abu Sayyaf Commanders Hamsiraji SALI and Sahir SALI were recovered amidst the volume of fire coming from the enemy positioned in high ground. This encounter resulted in seven terrorists killed, body counted, including the notorious SALI brothers, and the recovery of six 5.56 mm M16 rifles, two 40 mm Grenade launchers, one 12-gauge shotgun, three rounds 40mm grenades, hundreds of M16 ammunition rifle in seven bandoleers, and four combat packs with personal belongings and subversive documents.

By these gallant deeds, LIEUTENANT COLONEL BUAN distinguished himself in combat, in keeping with the finest tradition of Filipino soldiery."
