= Hamsiraji Marusi Sali =

Hamsiraji Sali
- Abu Sayyaf member
- Died: April 8, 2004; Basilan, Philippines

Hamsiraji Marusi Sali (died 2004) was a member of the Abu Sayyaf Group. He was wanted in the Philippines for at least twenty kidnappings, and wanted in the United States for three kidnappings and two murders.

Sali was killed, along with five accomplices, in a shootout with Philippine Army Scout Rangers under the command of Colonel Noel S. Buan on Basilan on 8 April 2004. One soldier was killed and three wounded in this action.

Three Filipino civilians, who provided information that was of some help in finding Sali, shared a US$1 million reward on 25 October 2004.
