= BRP Domingo Deluana =

Acero-class patrol gunboat in the Philippine Navy

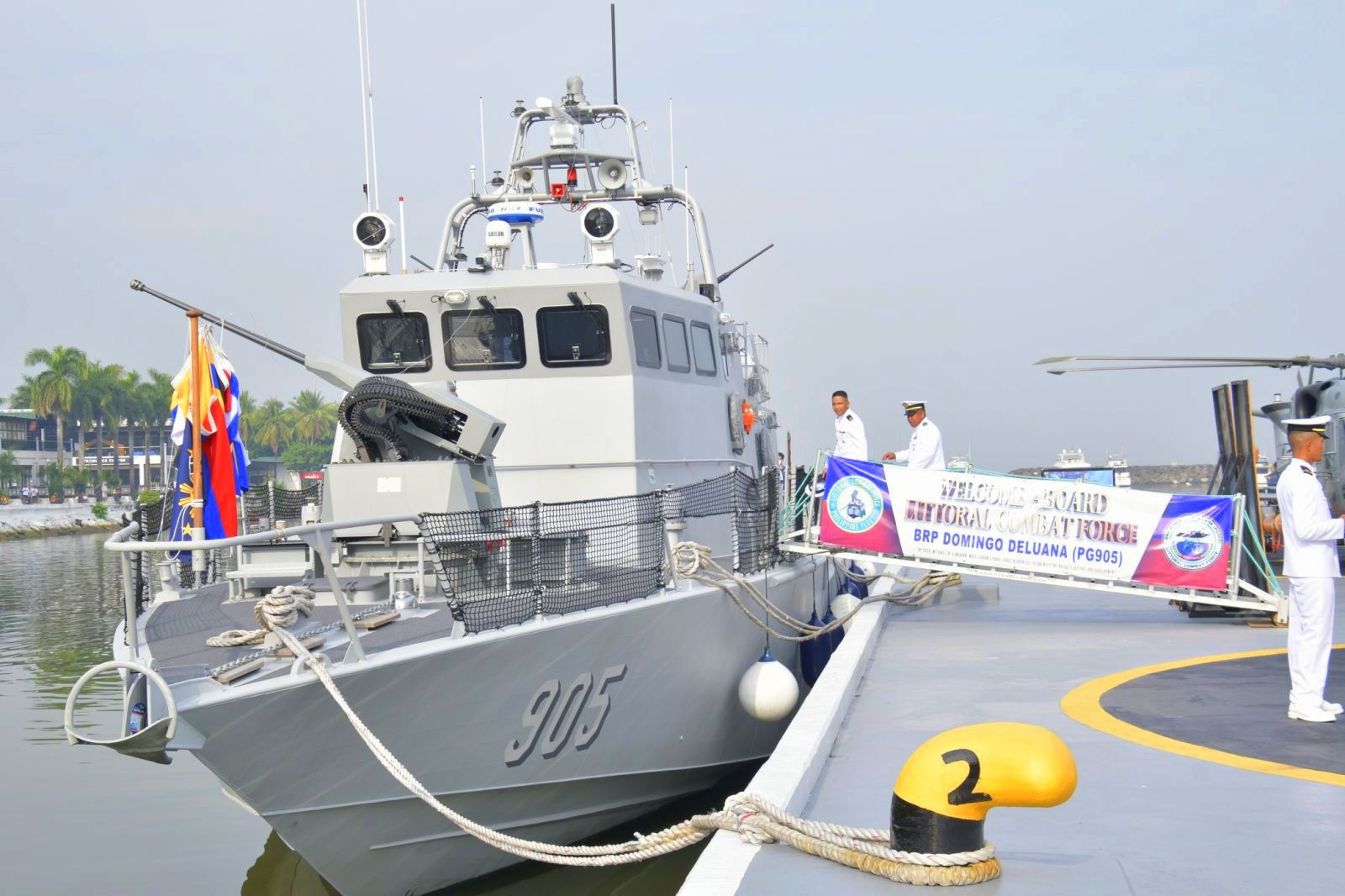

History

Philippines
- Name: BRP Domingo Deluana
- Namesake: Sergeant Domingo Deluana, PN (Marines), Philippine Medal of Valor Awardee
- Builder: Israel Shipyards Ltd.
- Acquired: 8 May 2023
- Commissioned: 26 May 2023
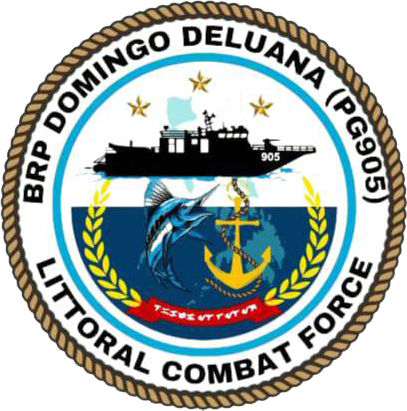
- Badge

General characteristics
- Class & type: Acero-class patrol gunboat
- Displacement: 95 tons full load
- Length: 32.65 m (107.1 ft)
- Beam: 6.2 m (20 ft) max
- Draft: 1.25 ft (0.38 m)
- Propulsion: 2 × MTU 16V 4000 M70 Diesel Engines; 2 x MJP-J650 waterjets
- Speed: greater than 40 knots (74 km/h) maximum
- Range: 1,000 nmi (1,900 km) at 15 knots (28 km/h)
- Complement: 12
- Sensors & processing systems: Furuno Navnet 3D X-band navigation/surface search radar; Rafael Toplite electro-optical tracking system (EOTS)
- Armament: 1 x Rafael Typhoon MLS-NLOS missile launcher for 8 x Spike-NLOS surface-to-surface missiles (fitted for but not with); 1 × Mk.44 Bushmaster II autocannon mounted on Rafael Typhoon Mk 30-C remote-controlled weapon station; 2 × M2HB Browning 12.7 mm/50-cal. heavy machine guns mounted on Rafael Mini Typhoon remote-controlled weapon stations; 2 × M60 7.62 mm/30-cal. GP machine guns
- Aircraft carried: none
- Aviation facilities: none

BRP Domingo Deluana (PG-905) is fourth ship of the class of the Acero-class patrol gunboat of the Philippine Navy. She was commissioned during the 125th Philippine Navy Anniversary on May 26, 2023.

== Namesake ==
Sergeant Domingo Deluana, PN (Marines) was a Philippine Marine Corps enlisted personnel and a posthumous recipient of the Philippines' highest military award for courage, the Medal of Valor.

Sergeant Deluana served with the 9th Marine Battalion during the 2000 Philippine campaign against the Moro Islamic Liberation Front. In a military operation in Matanog, Maguindanao (now part of Maguindanao del Norte), Deluana and Marine officer Lieutenant Lolinato To-ong were themselves wounded while providing suppressive fire to cover the medical evacuation of wounded fellow Marines. Despite their wounds, they continued manoeuvring and providing cover fire until a rocket propelled grenade blast hit the pair. Sgt. Deluana and Lt. To-ong were killed in action.

== History ==
In 2019, the Philippine Navy raised a requirement to procure a new class of coastal patrol interdiction craft (CPIC) that would be missile-capable and are based on Israel's Shaldag V patrol boat design, and would replace the Tomas Batilo-class fast attack crafts that have been retired in service.

A contract was signed between the (DND), Israel Shipyards Ltd. and Israeli Ministry of Defense on 9 February 2021, with the Notice to Proceed to start the effectivity of the contract released on 27 April 2021.

The fourth boat of the class, the BRP Domingo Deluana (PG-905), arrived in the Philippines from Israel together with its sister ship BRP Gener Tinangag (PG-903) on 11 April 2023. They were transported aboard the general cargo ship M/V Mick and unloaded at Cavite with the assistance of the landing craft BRP Mamanwa (LC-294). The vessel was formally christened on 8 May 2023 at the Naval Shipbuilding Facility Wharf in Fort San Felipe, Cavite City, with Senate President Juan Miguel Zubiri as the keynote speaker.

Subsequently, both vessels have commissioned into active service within the Littoral Combat Force on 26 May, 2023, during the 125th Anniversary of the Philippine Navy. Following a year-long deployment under Naval Forces Western Mindanao, the BRP Domingo Deluana was formally transferred to Naval Forces West in Palawan on 21 June 2024 during a ceremony in Zamboanga City to bolster maritime security and strengthen sovereignty patrols in the West Philippine Sea. During the ceremony, the vessel's commanding officer, Commander Alvin De Luna, was awarded the Bronze Cross Medal for achievements during the Mindanao deployment.

The hull number's use of "PG" indicates that the boats are classified as Patrol Gunboats based on Philippine Navy's 2016 naming classification standards.

== Design ==
=== Armament ===
The ship class was designed to carry one bow-mounted Mk.44 Bushmaster II autocannon mounted on Rafael Typhoon Mk 30-C remote-controlled weapon station, and two M2HB Browning 12.7 mm/50-cal. heavy machine guns mounted on Rafael Mini Typhoon remote-controlled weapon stations.

It is also one of the few ships of the class that did not have a Rafael Typhoon MLS-NLOS missile launcher for Spike-NLOS surface-to-surface missiles upon its commissioning, although the boat was fitted for the missile launcher there are plans to integrate such weapon in the future.
