= BRP Herminigildo Yurong =

Acero-class patrol gunboat in the Philippine Navy

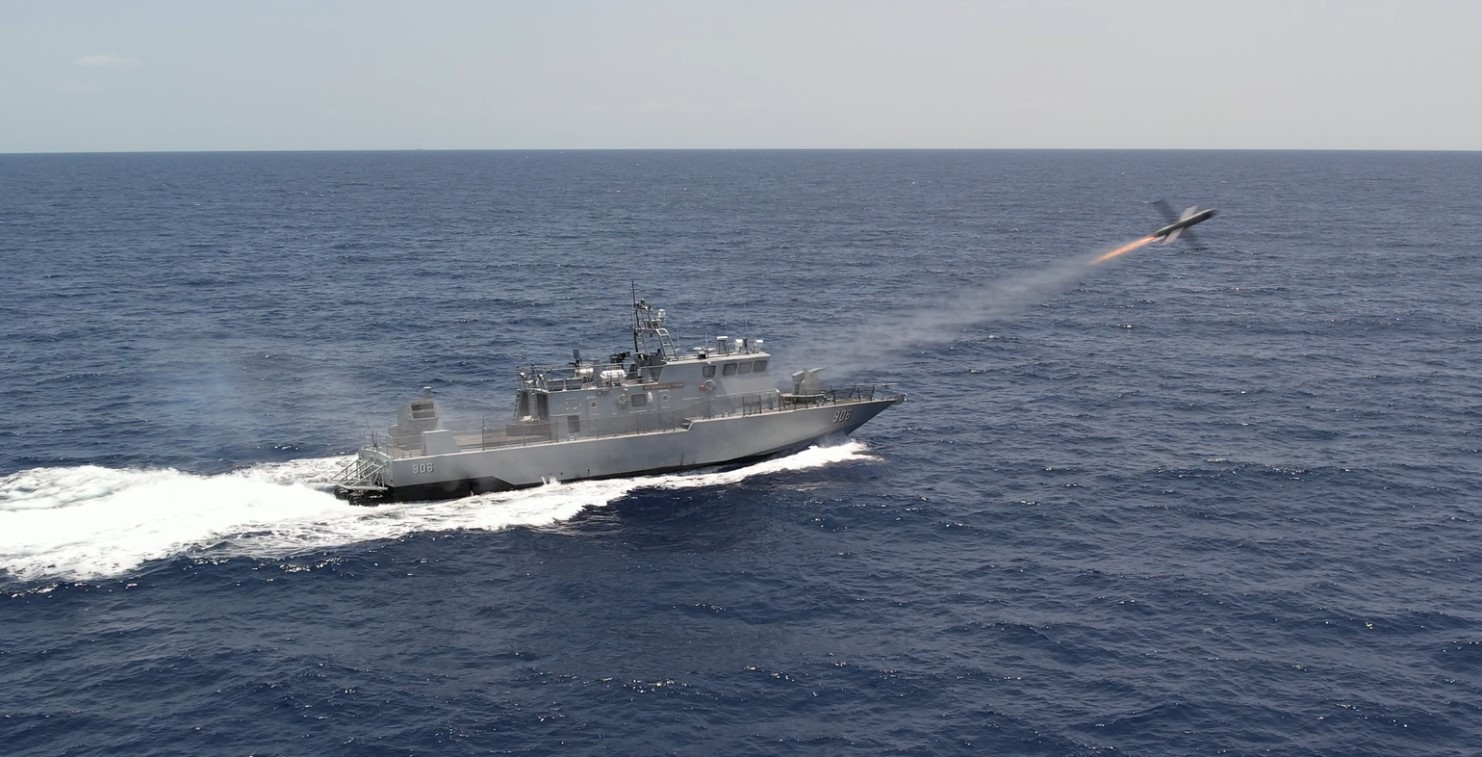
- Herminigildo Yurong firing a Spike-NLOS missile

History

Philippines
- Name: BRP Herminigildo Yurong
- Namesake: Staff Sergeant Herminigildo Yurong, PN (Marines), Philippine Medal of Valor Awardee
- Builder: Israel Shipyards Ltd.
- Acquired: 18 November 2023
- Commissioned: 21 May 2024

General characteristics
- Class & type: Acero-class gunboat
- Displacement: 95 tons full load
- Length: 32.65 m (107 ft 1 in)
- Beam: 6.2 m (20 ft 4 in) max
- Draft: 0.38 m (1.25 ft)
- Propulsion: 2 × MTU 16V 4000 M70 diesel engines; 2 x MJP-J650 waterjets
- Speed: greater than 40 knots (74 km/h) maximum
- Range: 1,000 nmi (1,900 km) at 15 knots (28 km/h)
- Complement: 12
- Sensors & processing systems: Furuno Navnet 3D X-band navigation/surface search radar; Rafael Toplite electro-optical tracking system (EOTS)
- Armament: 1 x Rafael Typhoon MLS-NLOS missile launcher for 8 x Spike-NLOS surface-to-surface missiles; 1 × Mk.44 Bushmaster II autocannon mounted on Rafael Typhoon Mk 30-C remote-controlled weapon station; 2 × M2HB Browning 12.7 mm/50 cal. heavy machine guns mounted on Rafael Mini Typhoon remote-controlled weapon stations; 2 × M60 7.62 mm/30 cal. GP machine guns

BRP Herminigildo Yurong (PG-906) is the fifth ship of the Acero-class patrol gunboat of the Philippine Navy. She was commissioned on 21 May 2024, just before the Philippine Navy's 126th Anniversary.

== Namesake ==
Staff Sergeant Herminigildo Yurong, PN (Marines) was a Philippine Marine Corps enlisted personnel and a posthumous recipient of the Philippines' highest military award for courage, the Medal of Valor.

Staff Sergeant Yurong served as a platoon sergeant with Marine Battalion Landing Team-2's Special operations-capable unit during the 2000 Philippine campaign against the Moro Islamic Liberation Front. In a military operation in Matanog, Maguindanao (now part of Maguindanao del Norte), Staff Sgt. Yurong led an assault against a numerically superior enemy force, but was killed in action when a rocket-propelled grenade round exploded nearby.

== History ==
In 2019, the Philippine Navy raised a requirement to procure a new class of coastal patrol interdiction craft (CPIC) that would be missile-capable and are based on Israel's Shaldag V patrol boat design, and would replace the Tomas Batilo-class fast attack crafts that have been retired in service.

A contract was signed between the (DND), Israel Shipyards Ltd. and Israeli Ministry of Defense on 9 February 2021, with the Notice to Proceed to start the effectivity of the contract released on 27 April 2021.

The fifth boat of the class, the Herminigildo Yurong (906), arrived in the Philippines together with its sister ship Laurence Narag (907) on 18 November 2023, and was christened as the BRP Herminigildo Yurong (PG-906). The hull number's use of "PG" indicates that the boats are classified as Patrol Gunboats based on Philippine Navy's 2016 naming classification standards. Subsequently, both vessels were commissioned into active service within the Littoral Combat Force on 21 May 2024.

== Design ==
=== Armament ===
The ship class was designed to carry one bow-mounted Mk.44 Bushmaster II autocannon mounted on Rafael Typhoon Mk 30-C remote-controlled weapon station, and two M2HB Browning 12.7 mm/50-caliber heavy machine guns mounted on Rafael Mini Typhoon remote-controlled weapon stations.
