= BRP Lolinato To-ong =

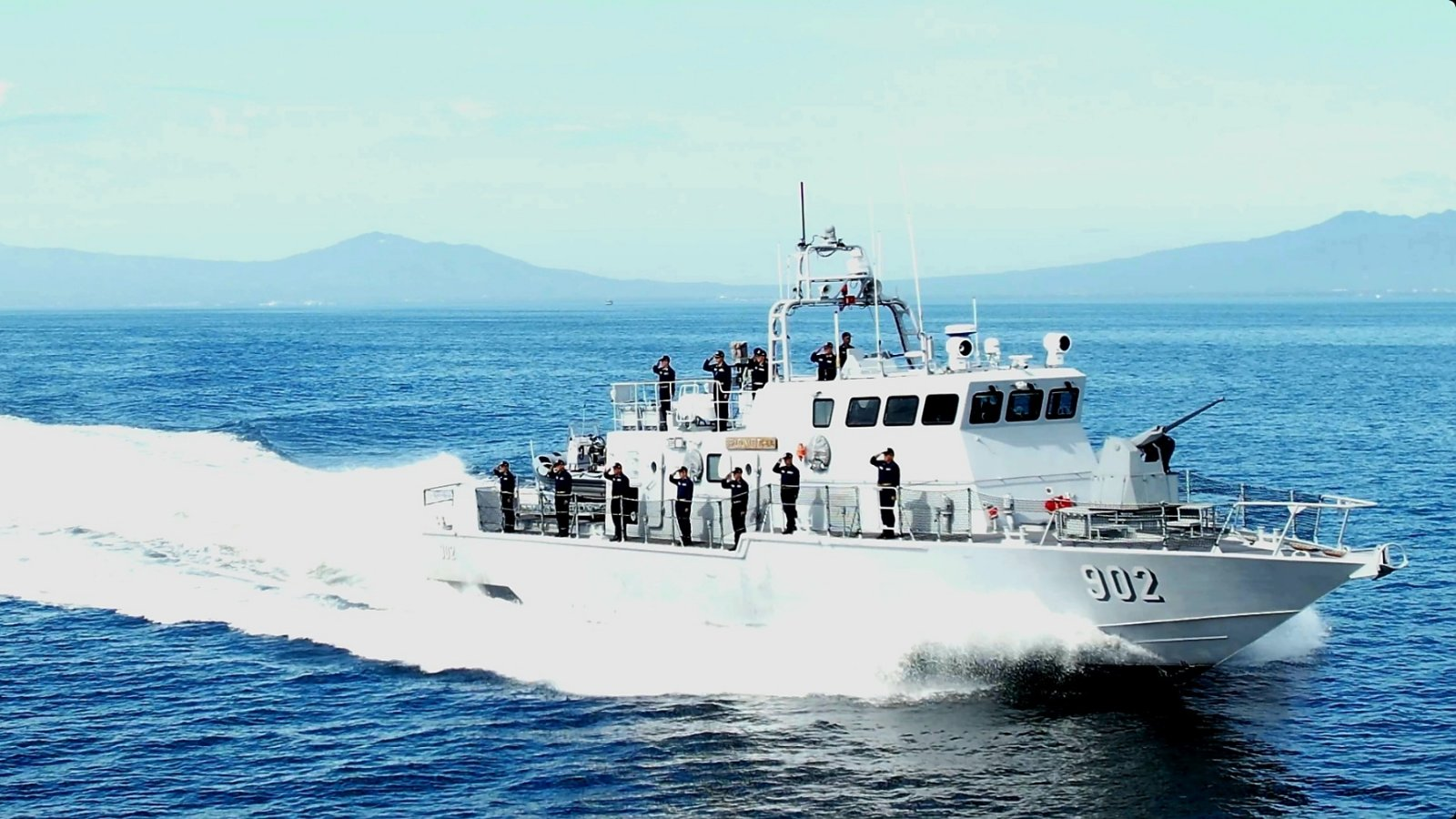
- BRP Lolinato To-ong (PG-902), now PG-201

History

Philippines
- Name: BRP Lolinato To-ong
- Namesake: First Lieutenant Lolinato To-ong, PN (Marines), Philippine Medal of Valor Awardee
- Builder: Israel Shipyards Ltd.
- Launched: 26 June 2022
- Acquired: 6 September 2022
- Commissioned: 28 November 2022
- Status: in active service

General characteristics
- Class & type: Acero-class patrol gunboat
- Displacement: 95 tons full load
- Length: 32.65 m (107.1 ft)
- Beam: 6.2 m (20 ft) max
- Draft: 1.25 ft (0.38 m)
- Propulsion: 2 × MTU 16V 4000 M70 Diesel Engines; 2 x MJP-J650 waterjets
- Speed: greater than 40 knots (74 km/h) maximum
- Range: 1,000 nmi (1,900 km) at 15 knots (28 km/h)
- Complement: 12
- Sensors & processing systems: Furuno Navnet 3D X-band navigation/surface search radar; Rafael Toplite electro-optical tracking system (EOTS)
- Armament: 1 x Rafael Typhoon MLS-NLOS missile launcher for 8 x Spike-NLOS surface-to-surface missiles (fitted for but not with); 1 × Mk.44 Bushmaster II autocannon mounted on Rafael Typhoon Mk 30-C remote-controlled weapon station; 2 × M2HB Browning 12.7 mm/50-cal. heavy machine guns mounted on Rafael Mini Typhoon remote-controlled weapon stations; 2 × M60 7.62 mm/30-cal. GP machine guns

BRP Lolinato To-ong (PG-201) is second ship of the class of the Acero-class patrol gunboat of the Philippine Navy. She was commissioned with the Philippine Navy on 28 November 2022 and is currently in active service with the Littoral Combat Force, Philippine Fleet.

== Namesake ==
First Lieutenant Lolinato To-ong, PN (Marines) was a Philippine Marine Corps officer and a posthumous recipient of the Philippines' highest military award for courage, the Medal of Valor.

Then-First Lieutenant To-ong served with the 52nd Marine Company of the Force Reconnaissance Battalion during the 2000 Philippine campaign against the Moro Islamic Liberation Front. In a military operation in Matanog, Maguindanao (now part of Maguindanao del Norte), To-ong and enlisted Marine Domingo Deluana were themselves wounded while providing suppressive fire to cover the medical evacuation of wounded fellow Marines. Despite their wounds, they continued manoeuvring and providing cover fire until an RPG blast caught the pair. Both To-ong and Deluana were killed in action.

== History ==
In 2019, the Philippine Navy raised a requirement to procure a new class of coastal patrol interdiction craft (CPIC) that would be missile-capable and are based on Israel's Shaldag V patrol boat design, and would replace the Tomas Batilo-class fast attack crafts that have been retired in service.

A contract was signed between the (DND), Israel Shipyards Ltd. and Israeli Ministry of Defense on 9 February 2021, with the Notice to Proceed to start the effectivity of the contract released on 27 April 2021.

The second boat of the class, the Lolinato To-ong (902), was launched on 26 June 2022. The boat arrived in the Philippines together with its sistership Nestor Acero (901) in early September 2022, and was christened as the BRP Lolinato To-ong (PG-902) on 6 September 2022. Both boats were commissioned with the Philippine Navy on 28 November 2022 and was assigned with the Littoral Combat Force. These were the first two ships delivered and commissioned out of nine initial Fast Attack Interdiction Crafts ordered by the Philippine Navy for this project.

The hull number's use of "PG" indicates that the boats are classified as Patrol Gunboats based on Philippine Navy's 2016 naming classification standards.

Under a new Standard Operating Procedures on Classification, Name, Number and Categorization of Philippine Navy ships, craft, aircraft and ground equipage released in 2026, the BRP Lolinato To-ong's pennant number was replaced from PG-902 to PG-201.

== Design ==
=== Armament ===
The ship class was designed to carry one bow-mounted Mk.44 Bushmaster II autocannon mounted on Rafael Typhoon Mk 30-C remote-controlled weapon station, and two M2HB Browning 12.7 mm/50-cal. heavy machine guns mounted on Rafael Mini Typhoon remote-controlled weapon stations.

It is also one of the few ships of the class that did not have a Rafael Typhoon MLS-NLOS missile launcher for Spike-NLOS surface-to-surface missiles upon its commissioning, although the boat was fitted for the missile launcher there are plans to integrate such weapon in the future.
