= BRP Gener Tinangag =

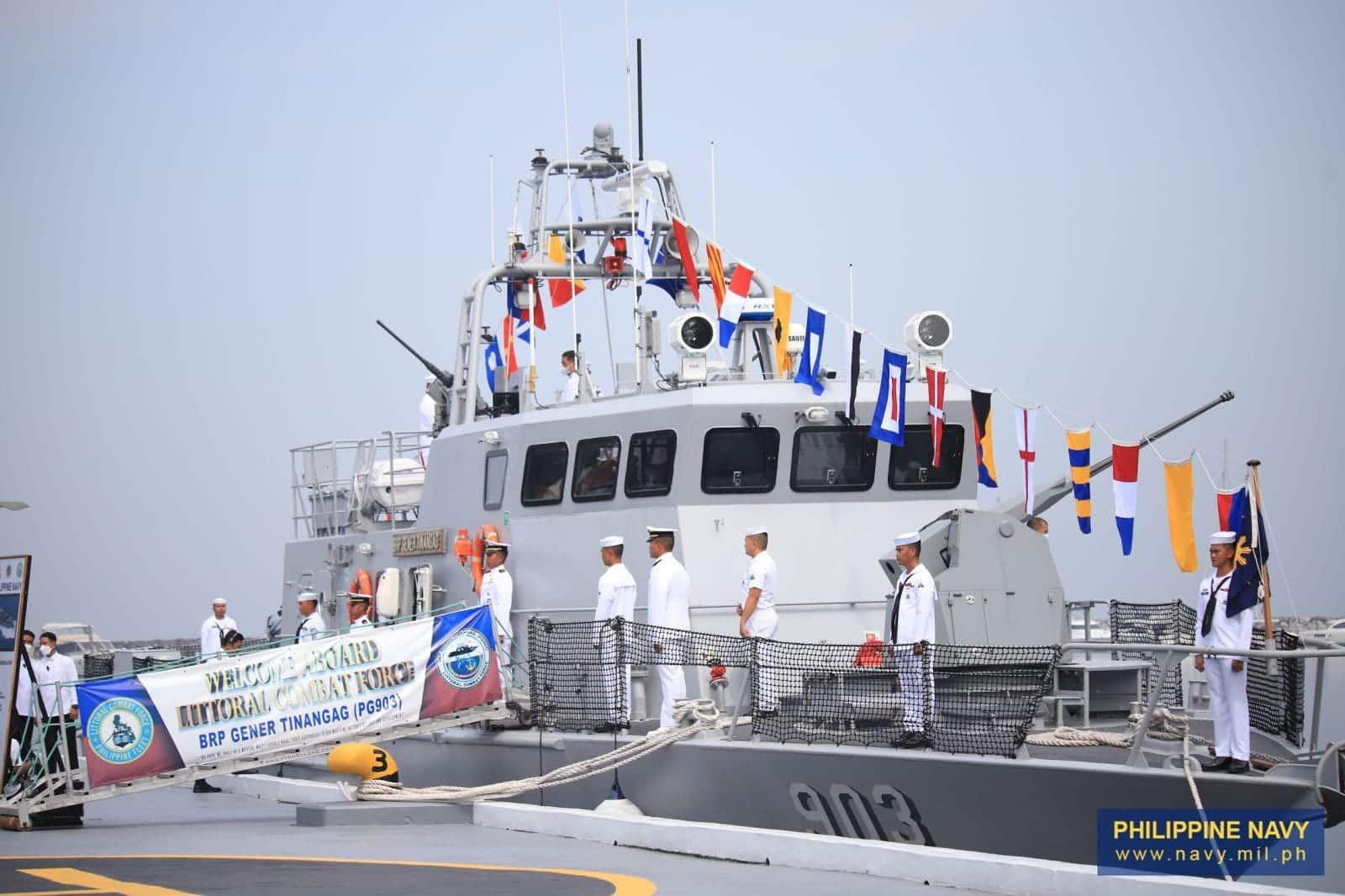

History

Philippines
- Name: BRP Gener Tinangag
- Namesake: Corporal Gener Tinangag, PN (Marines), Philippine Medal of Valor Awardee
- Builder: Israel Shipyards Ltd.
- Acquired: 8 May 2023
- Commissioned: 26 May 2023
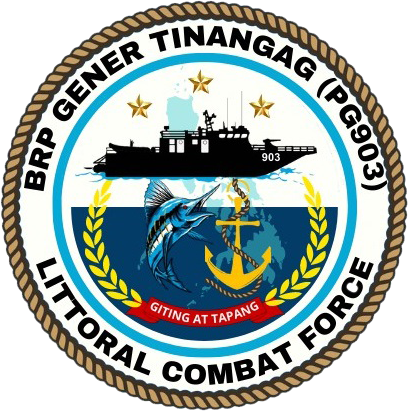
- Badge

General characteristics
- Class & type: Acero-class patrol gunboat
- Displacement: 95 tons full load
- Length: 32.65 m (107.1 ft)
- Beam: 6.2 m (20 ft) max
- Draft: 1.25 ft (0.38 m)
- Propulsion: 2 × MTU 16V 4000 M70 Diesel Engines; 2 x MJP-J650 waterjets
- Speed: greater than 40 knots (74 km/h) maximum
- Range: 1,000 nmi (1,900 km) at 15 knots (28 km/h)
- Complement: 12
- Sensors & processing systems: Furuno Navnet 3D X-band navigation/surface search radar; Rafael Toplite electro-optical tracking system (EOTS)
- Armament: 1 x Rafael Typhoon MLS-NLOS missile launcher for 8 x Spike-NLOS surface-to-surface missiles (fitted for but not with); 1 × Mk.44 Bushmaster II autocannon mounted on Rafael Typhoon Mk 30-C remote-controlled weapon station; 2 × M2HB Browning 12.7 mm/50-cal. heavy machine guns mounted on Rafael Mini Typhoon remote-controlled weapon stations; 2 × M60 7.62 mm/30-cal. GP machine guns
- Aircraft carried: none
- Aviation facilities: none

BRP Gener Tinangag (PG-903) is third ship of the class of the Acero-class patrol gunboat of the Philippine Navy. She was commissioned during the 125th Philippine Navy Anniversary on May 26, 2023.

== Namesake ==
Corporal Gener Tinangag, PN (Marines) was a Philippine Marine Corps enlisted personnel and a posthumous recipient of the Philippines' highest military award for courage, the Medal of Valor.

Then Private First Class Tinangag was an assistant automatic rifleman with the Special Operations Platoon (SOP), Marine Battalion Landing Team (MBLT)-5. His unit was among the initial responders to the Marawi crisis, and on June 9, 2017, MBLT-5 reinforced other Marine units in the vicinity of Mapandi Bridge in Lilod Madaya, Marawi City.

PFC Tinangag and three other comrades were tasked with extricating dead and wounded Marines. When his companions went on a break, he decided to strike out on his own. His efforts paid off when he managed to rescue four wounded Marines and was in the process of retrieving the body of a slain lieutenant when he was hit by sniper fire and wounded by grenade fragments. Despite his wounds, he managed to make it back to safety with the lieutenant's body but later succumbed to his injuries.

His remains and those of twelve of his slain comrades were flown back to Manila on June 11, 2017.

== History ==
In 2019, the Philippine Navy raised a requirement to procure a new class of coastal patrol interdiction craft (CPIC) that would be missile-capable and are based on Israel's Shaldag V patrol boat design, and would replace the Tomas Batilo-class fast attack crafts that have been retired in service.

A contract was signed between the (DND), Israel Shipyards Ltd. and Israeli Ministry of Defense on 9 February 2021, with the Notice to Proceed to start the effectivity of the contract released on 27 April 2021.

The third boat of the class, the Gener Tinangag (903), arrived in the Philippines together with its sistership Domingo Deluana (905) on 11 April 2023, and was christened as the BRP Gener Tinangag (PG-903) on 8 May 2023.

Subsequently, both vessels have commissioned into active service within the Littoral Combat Force on 26 May, 2023, during the 125th Anniversary of the Philippine Navy.

The hull number's use of "PG" indicates that the boats are classified as Patrol Gunboats based on Philippine Navy's 2016 naming classification standards.

== Design ==
=== Armament ===
The ship class was designed to carry one bow-mounted Mk.44 Bushmaster II autocannon mounted on Rafael Typhoon Mk 30-C remote-controlled weapon station, and two M2HB Browning 12.7 mm/50-cal. heavy machine guns mounted on Rafael Mini Typhoon remote-controlled weapon stations.

It is also one of the few ships of the class that did not have a Rafael Typhoon MLS-NLOS missile launcher for Spike-NLOS surface-to-surface missiles upon its commissioning, although the boat was fitted for the missile launcher there are plans to integrate such weapon in the future.
