= BRP Laurence Narag =

Acero-class patrol gunboat in the Philippine Navy

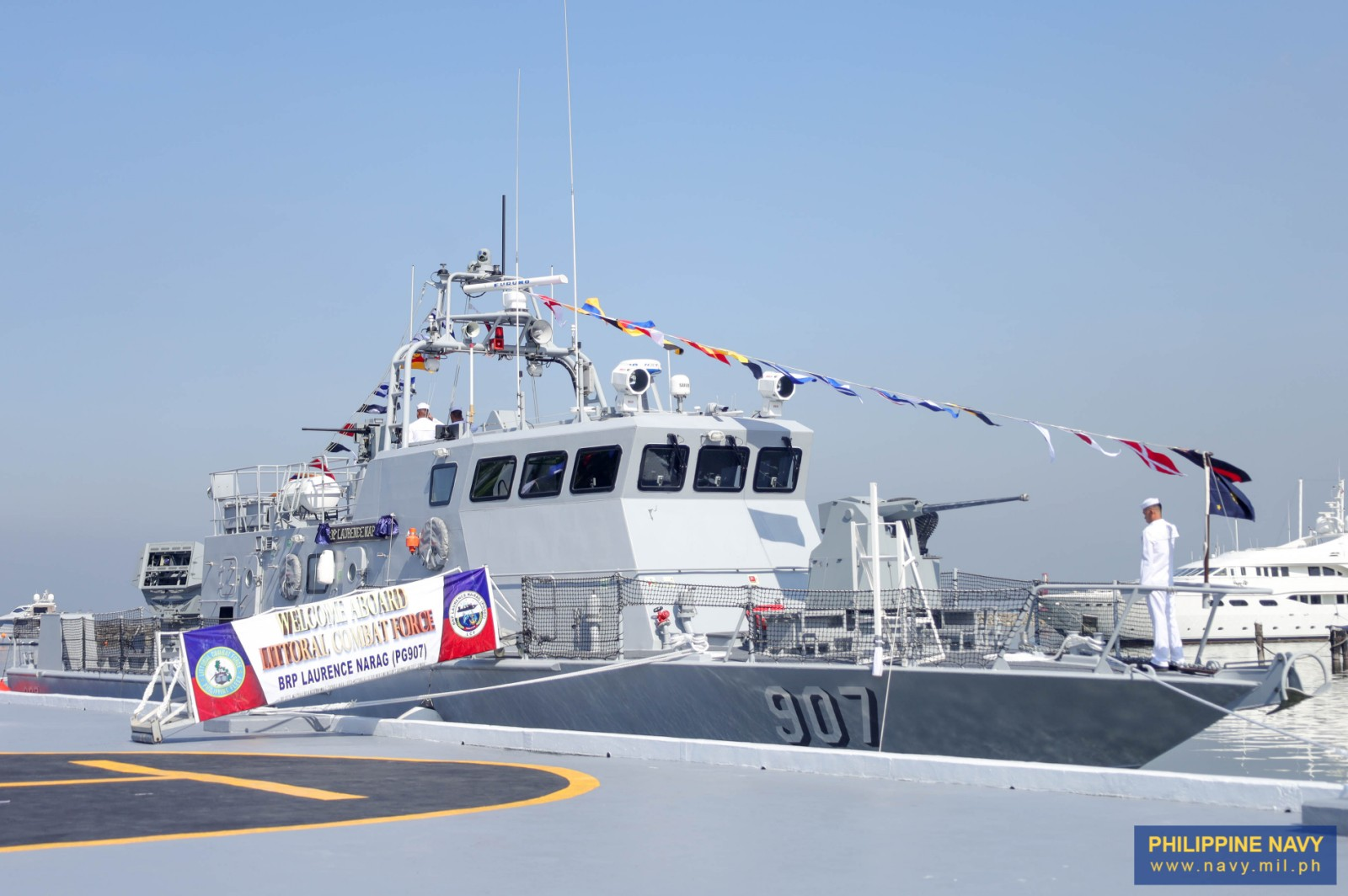
- BRP Laurence Narag (PG-907), now PG-205

History

Philippines
- Name: BRP Laurence Narag
- Namesake: Corporal Laurence Narag Sr., PN (Marines), Philippine Medal of Valor Awardee
- Builder: Israel Shipyards Ltd.
- Acquired: 18 November 2023
- Commissioned: 21 May 2024
- Reclassified: 2026
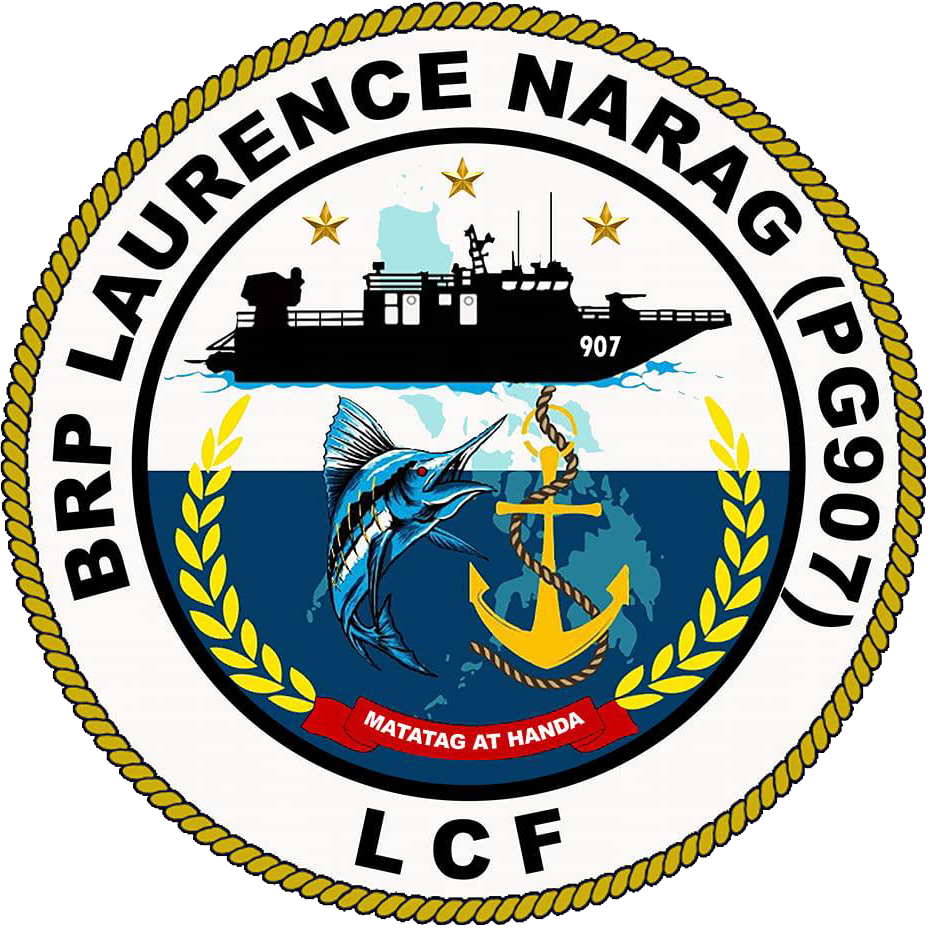
- Badge

General characteristics
- Class & type: Acero-class gunboat
- Displacement: 95 tons full load
- Length: 32.65 m (107 ft 1 in)
- Beam: 6.2 m (20 ft 4 in) max
- Draft: 0.38 m (1.25 ft)
- Propulsion: 2 × MTU 16V 4000 M70 diesel engines; 2 x MJP-J650 waterjets
- Speed: greater than 40 knots (74 km/h) maximum
- Range: 1,000 nmi (1,900 km) at 15 knots (28 km/h)
- Complement: 12
- Sensors & processing systems: Furuno Navnet 3D X-band navigation/surface search radar; Rafael Toplite electro-optical tracking system (EOTS)
- Armament: 1 x Rafael Typhoon MLS-NLOS missile launcher for 8 x Spike-NLOS surface-to-surface missiles; 1 × Mk.44 Bushmaster II autocannon mounted on Rafael Typhoon Mk 30-C remote-controlled weapon station; 2 × M2HB Browning 12.7 mm/50 cal. heavy machine guns mounted on Rafael Mini Typhoon remote-controlled weapon stations; 2 × M60 7.62 mm/30 cal. GP machine guns

BRP Laurence Narag (PG-907) is the sixth ship of the Acero-class patrol gunboat of the Philippine Navy. She was commissioned on 21 May 2024, just before the Philippine Navy's 126th Anniversary.

== Namesake ==
Corporal Laurence Narag Sr., PN (Marines) was a Philippine Marine Corps enlisted personnel and a posthumous recipient of the Philippines' highest military award for courage, the Medal of Valor.

Corporal Narag served as a radioman with 61st Marine Company, Force Reconnaissance Battalion during the 2000 Philippine campaign against the Moro Islamic Liberation Front. In a military operation in Kauswagan, Lanao del Norte, Corporal Narag conducted reconnaissance on an entrenched MILF position but was detected and drew sniper fire. He was eventually wounded but managed to establish contact with a Philippine Air Force OV-10 Bronco and was able to coordinate close air support. A hospital corpsman, Corporal Ernesto Layaguin attempted to come to his aid but was himself wounded and eventually hit by sniper fire that caused his death. Narag continued firing at the enemy and coordinating air strikes despite his wounds. His commanding officer eventually had to drag him to a medevac vehicle for evacuation. Narag died of wounds later in a hospital.

== History ==
In 2019, the Philippine Navy raised a requirement to procure a new class of coastal patrol interdiction craft (CPIC) that would be missile-capable and are based on Israel's Shaldag V patrol boat design, and would replace the Tomas Batilo-class fast attack crafts that have been retired in service.

A contract was signed between the (DND), Israel Shipyards Ltd. and Israeli Ministry of Defense on 9 February 2021, with the Notice to Proceed to start the effectivity of the contract released on 27 April 2021.

The sixth boat of the class, the Laurence Narag (907), arrived in the Philippines together with its sistership Herminigildo Yurong (906) on 18 November 2023, and was christened as the BRP Laurence Narag (PG-907).

Subsequently, both vessels have commissioned into active service within the Littoral Combat Force on 21 May 2024.

The hull number's use of "PG" indicates that the boats are classified as Patrol Gunboats based on Philippine Navy's 2016 naming classification standards.

Under a new Standard Operating Procedures on Classification, Name, Number and Categorization of Philippine Navy ships, craft, aircraft and ground equipage released in 2026, the BRP Laurence Narag's pennant number was replaced from PG-907 to PG-205.

== Design ==
=== Armament ===
The ship class was designed to carry one bow-mounted Mk.44 Bushmaster II autocannon mounted on Rafael Typhoon Mk 30-C remote-controlled weapon station, and two M2HB Browning 12.7 mm/50-cal. heavy machine guns mounted on Rafael Mini Typhoon remote-controlled weapon stations.
