= Battle of Camp Abubakar =

2000 Philippine victory in the Moro conflict

- Part of the Moro conflict and the 2000 Philippine campaign against the Moro Islamic Liberation Front
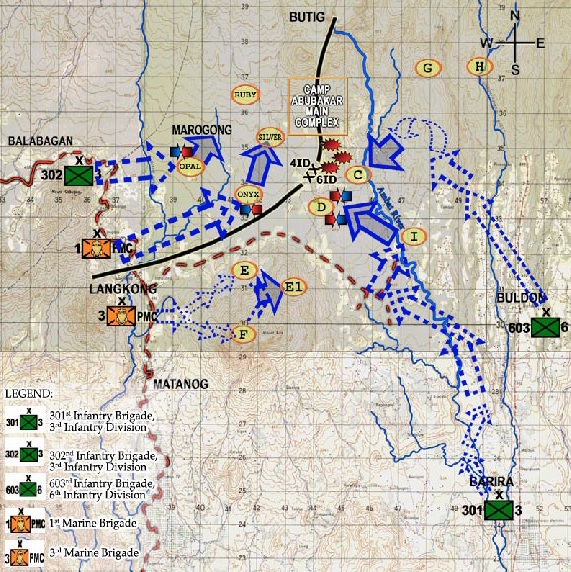
- Positions of three Philippine Army brigades and two Philippine Marine Corps brigades in relation to Camp Abubakar's central complex during the sixth day of the battle.
Date	July 1-9, 2000
Location	Barira, Maguindanao del Norte, Philippines 7.5434°N 124.3111°E
Result	Philippine government victory

Belligerents
Philippines	Moro Islamic Liberation Front

Commanders and leaders
Joseph Estrada; Diomedio Villanueva; Benjamin Defensor; Elonor Padre	Salamat Hashim; Murad Ebrahim

Units involved
Armed Forces of the Philippines; Philippine Army; Philippine Air Force; Philippine Navy; Philippine Marine Corps	Bangsamoro Islamic Armed Forces (BIAF)

Strength
6,000	Unknown

Casualties and losses
12 killed 127 wounded	23 killed
- Thousands of families displaced

The Battle of Camp Abubakar, codenamed Operation Terminal Velocity, was the final phase of the 2000 Philippine campaign against the Moro Islamic Liberation Front which resulted in the capture of Camp Abubakar al Siddique, stronghold of the Moro Islamic Liberation Front and its largest settlement, and seat of its Shariah-based government.

Prior to April 2000, the MILF had been allowed to operate approximately 50 camps that were off limits to government soldiers. When the MILF broke off peace talks, the Armed Forces of the Philippines, the Philippine Army in particular, began attacking and destroying the bases one after the other.

Camp Abubakar covered approximately forty square miles and included a mosque, a madrasah, commercial and residential areas, a weapons factory, a solar energy system, and segments of seven different villages.

== Background ==
The Moro Islamic Liberation Front, a faction of the Moro National Liberation Front which had broken away in 1977, initially supported the MNLF during the peace talks that culminated in the 1996 Final Peace Agreement. They however, rejected the agreement as inadequate, reiterating a demand for a "Bangsamoro Islamic State", and not just simple political autonomy. That same year, the MILF began informal talks with the government of Fidel V. Ramos. These talks, however, were not pursued and the MILF began recruiting and establishing camps, becoming the dominant Muslim rebel group.

The administration of Joseph Estrada, Ramos' successor, advocated a hardline stance against the MILF, ultimately directing the Armed Forces of the Philippines to "go all out" against the MILF on March 21, 2000, after the group invaded the town of Kauswagan, Lanao del Norte and took hundreds of residents hostage. Government forces managed to retake the town; in the succeeding month the MILF attempted to recapture it again but were unsuccessful. At the same time, the Muslim rebels began attacking Philippine Army units in Buldon, Maguindanao del Norte, in what proved to be the initial salvo of hostilities in locations leading towards Camp Abubakar.

== Plan ==
The AFP Southern Command put into action several military operations, culminating in three, Operation Grand Sweeper, Operation Supreme and Operation Terminal Velocity, which had the objective of capturing of Camp Abubakar. Operation Grand Sweeper was a combined ground and air assault that destroyed the headquarters of the MILF Eastern Ranao Sur Revolutionary Committee in Masiu, Lanao del Sur and the minor MILF camps in Marogong, Lanao del Sur. Operation Supreme's objective was the capture of Camp Busrah, the MILF's second-largest camp, which was defended by an 800-man unit. It was taken with no resistance; the defenders had abandoned the camp.

== Battle ==
Operation Terminal Velocity's objective was the capture of Camp Abubakar itself. Three days of air strikes by OV-10 Broncos of the Philippine Air Force preceded the operation which began on July 1, 2000. Offensive operations were undertaken by three infantry divisions; spearheading the assault were the 6th Infantry Division and the 4th Infantry Division while the 1st Infantry Division was held in reserve.

The three divisions moved into their respective assembly areas and Camp Abubakar was then bombarded by 105mm howitzers and air strikes. The two assault divisions then moved out to their objectives, the 6th Division attacking from the southern portion of the camp and the 4th Division attacking from the west. Two brigades from the Philippine Marine Corps were also utilized in this assault. At one point during the battle, three Northrop F-5's of the Philippine Air Force dropped 750 lb bombs on Camp Abubakar, targeting communications facilities.

By July 8, 2000, the government forces had captured among others, the headquarters of the Bangsamoro Islamic Women Auxiliary Brigade, the headquarters of the 2nd Battalion, GHQ Division of the BIAF, the Supply and Logistics Office of the HQs National Guard Division of the BIAF, the MILF Abdurahaman Bedis Memorial Military Academy, and MILF chairman Salamat Hashim's personal quarters.

== Aftermath ==
External videos
- ABS-CBN's Throwback report on the Fall of Camp Abubakar (in Filipino), YouTube video

AFP Southern Command Commanding General Diomedo Villanueva inspected the captured Camp Abubakar on July 9, 2000. The next day, then-President Joseph Estrada himself visited the captured Muslim rebel camp and raised the Philippine flag there, "in assertion of sovereignty". He also brought truckloads of lechon and beer for the government troops, earning criticism from both devout Muslims and Catholic clerics for his insensitivity.

The Philippine Army took over Camp Abubakar and renamed it Camp Iranun, presumably after the Iranun people, a Moro ethnic group native to the area. The camp became the headquarters of the Philippine Army's 603rd Brigade about a year after its capture. In 2015, the brigade moved out of the camp and was replaced by a smaller unit, the Philippine Army's 37th Infantry Battalion.

In the years after the 2000 war, the former battleground has been transformed into agricultural farms. The government built roads, while the Philippine Army Corps of Engineers built a mosque to replace one that was destroyed in the fighting. Gawad Kalinga, the community development foundation, built homes for displaced villagers.

The United States Center for Strategic Intelligence Research has concluded that the 2000 Philippine consulate bombing in Jakarta, Indonesia and the 2000 Rizal Day bombings were conducted by the MILF in collusion with their Jemaah Islamiyah allies as an act of retaliation for the fall of Camp Abubakar.

== See also ==
- 2000 Philippine campaign against the Moro Islamic Liberation Front
- Bangsamoro peace process
- Moro conflict
