= Shaldag =

Shaldag (Hebrew: שלדג) is Hebrew for "kingfisher". It may refer to:

- Shaldag-class patrol boat, an Israeli Sea Corps patrol boat
- Shaldag Unit, an Israeli Air Force commando unit
