= Acero-class gunboat =

Philippine Navy fast attack craft

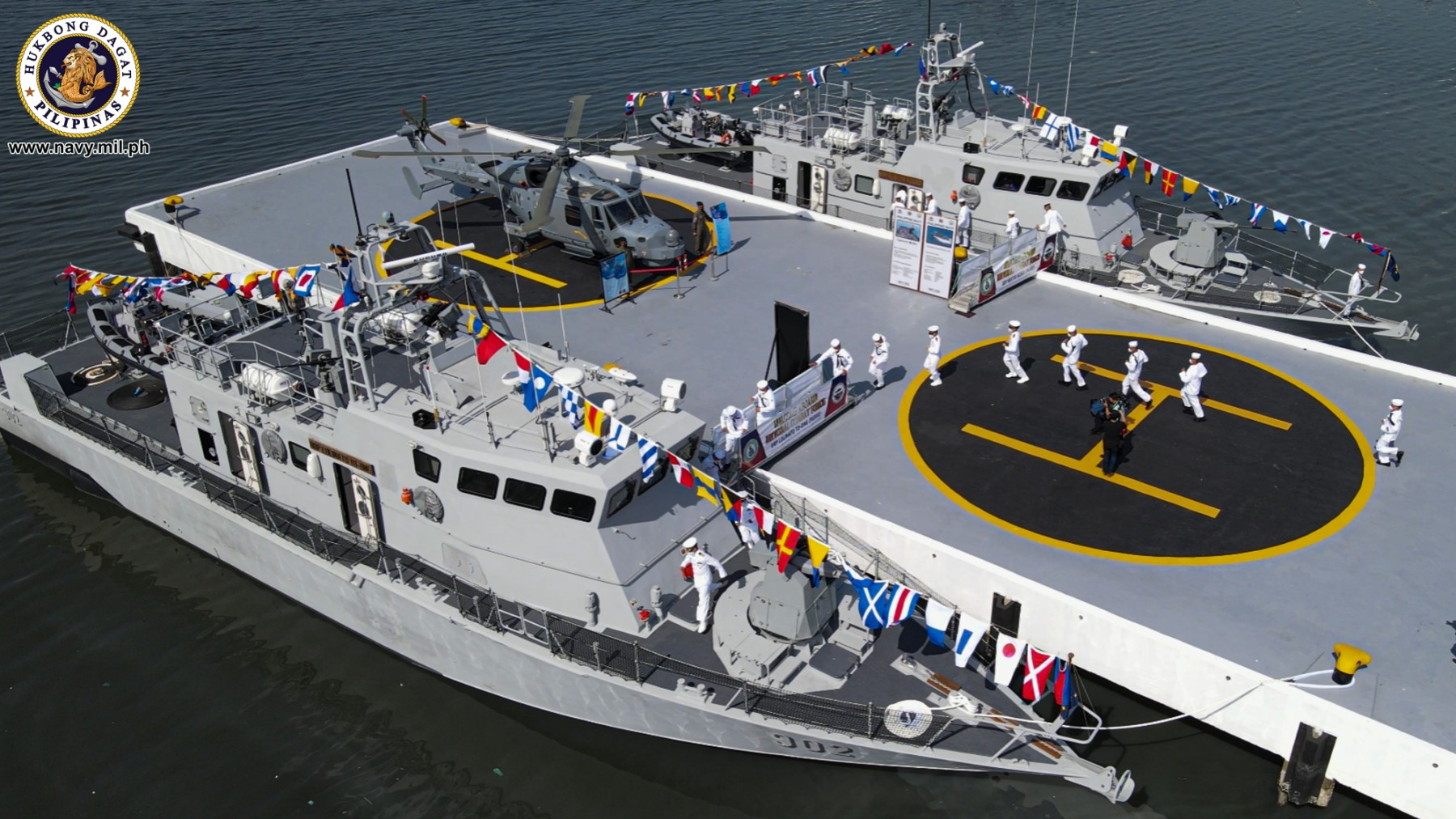
- BRP Nestor Acero (PG-901), an Acero-class FAIC assigned as a patrol gunboat.

Class overview
- Builders: Israel Shipyards Ltd., Haifa, Israel
- Operators: Philippine Navy
- Preceded by: Tomas Batilo class
- Built: 2021–2023
- In commission: 2022–present
- Planned: 9
- Completed: 9
- Active: 9

General characteristics
- Type: Fast Attack Interdiction Craft-Missiled
- Displacement: 95 tons full load
- Length: 32.65 m (107 ft 1 in)
- Beam: 6.2 m (20 ft 4 in) max
- Draft: 1.25 m (4 ft 1 in)
- Propulsion: 2 × MTU 16V 4000 M70 diesel engines; 2 x MJP-J650 waterjets
- Speed: greater than 40 knots (74 km/h) maximum
- Range: 1,000 nmi (1,900 km) at 15 knots (28 km/h)
- Complement: 12
- Sensors & processing systems: Furuno Navnet 3D X-band navigation/surface search radar; Rafael Toplite electro-optical tracking system (EOTS)
- Armament: 1 x Rafael Typhoon MLS-NLOS missile launcher for 8 x Spike-NLOS surface-to-surface missiles (4 ships only); 1 × Mk.44 Bushmaster II autocannon mounted on Rafael Typhoon Mk 30-C remote-controlled weapon station; 2 × M2HB Browning 12.7 mm/50 cal. heavy machine guns mounted on Rafael Mini Typhoon remote-controlled weapon stations; 2 × M60 7.62 mm/30 cal. GP machine guns

The Acero class is a class of fast attack interdiction craft based on the Israel Shaldag V design that are in service with the Philippine Navy and officially designated as patrol gunboats (PG).

== History ==
In 2019, the Philippine Navy raised a requirement to procure a new class of Fast Attack Interdiction Craft (FAIC) that would be missile-capable and are based on Israel's Shaldag V patrol boat design, to replace the Tomas Batilo-class fast attack craft that had been retired from service.

Israel Shipyards Ltd. had offered the Shaldag V design to the Philippine Navy as early as 2016. Funding to pursue the proposal was not available until a few years afterwards.

The Israeli design was proven to be more capable as an interdiction craft than the smaller Multi-Purpose Attack Craft that were originally designed by a Taiwanese shipbuilder as a troop insertion assault boat, and modified in Philippine Navy service to be used as a small missile boat. Thus, when the Philippine Navy raised the requirement for a fast attack interdiction craft, the Philippines' Department of National Defense (DND) made a decision to procure them based on the Israeli proposal, and would be acquired under a Government-to-Government (G2G) deal with Israel.

A contract was signed between the (DND), Israel Shipyards Ltd. and Israeli Ministry of Defense in February 2021, with the Notice to Proceed to start the effectivity of the contract released in April 2021.

The first boat of the class, the BRP Nestor Acero (PG-901), was launched in June 2022, and became the basis for the class' name. The hull number's use of "PG" indicates that the boats are classified as Patrol Gunboats based on Philippine Navy's 2016 naming classification standards. But the globally, the Shaldag is recognized as a fast attack interdiction craft (FAIC) and missiled (FAIC-M).

In November 2022, Rear Admiral Toribio Acaci indicated that the service plans to acquire a total of 15 more Acero-class / Shaldag Mk. V patrol gunboats in the near future.

Two more Acero-class gunboats were delivered on 11 April 2023, christened on 8 May 2023. and commissioned on 26 May 2023.

The Philippine Navy's Naval Sea Systems Command announced the revival of their naval shipbuilding capability with the reopening of the Naval Shipbuilding Center, previously called the Cavite Naval Yard, which was refurbished and retooled as part Israel Shipyard's contract to supply fast attack interdiction crafts to the Philippine Navy. The new facility will take over production of the remaining units of the Acero class (Shaldag Mk. V) that were ordered by the DND under the FAIC-M Acquisition Project, and will likely do so for any future orders.

On 12 April 2024, a field test was conducted where a Spike missile was fired in the waters of Mariveles, Bataan.

On 8 May 2024, BRP Lawrence Narag participated in the maritime strike exercise of Balikatan 2024, which consisted of a sinking exercises (SINKEX) using the decommissioned BRP Lake Caliraya as a target ship. The Lawrence Narag fired a Spike-NLOS missile and successfully hit the target during the exercise. On 18 June, Lawrence Narag was assigned to Naval Forces Western Mindanao and deployed to Zamboanga City.

== Technical details ==
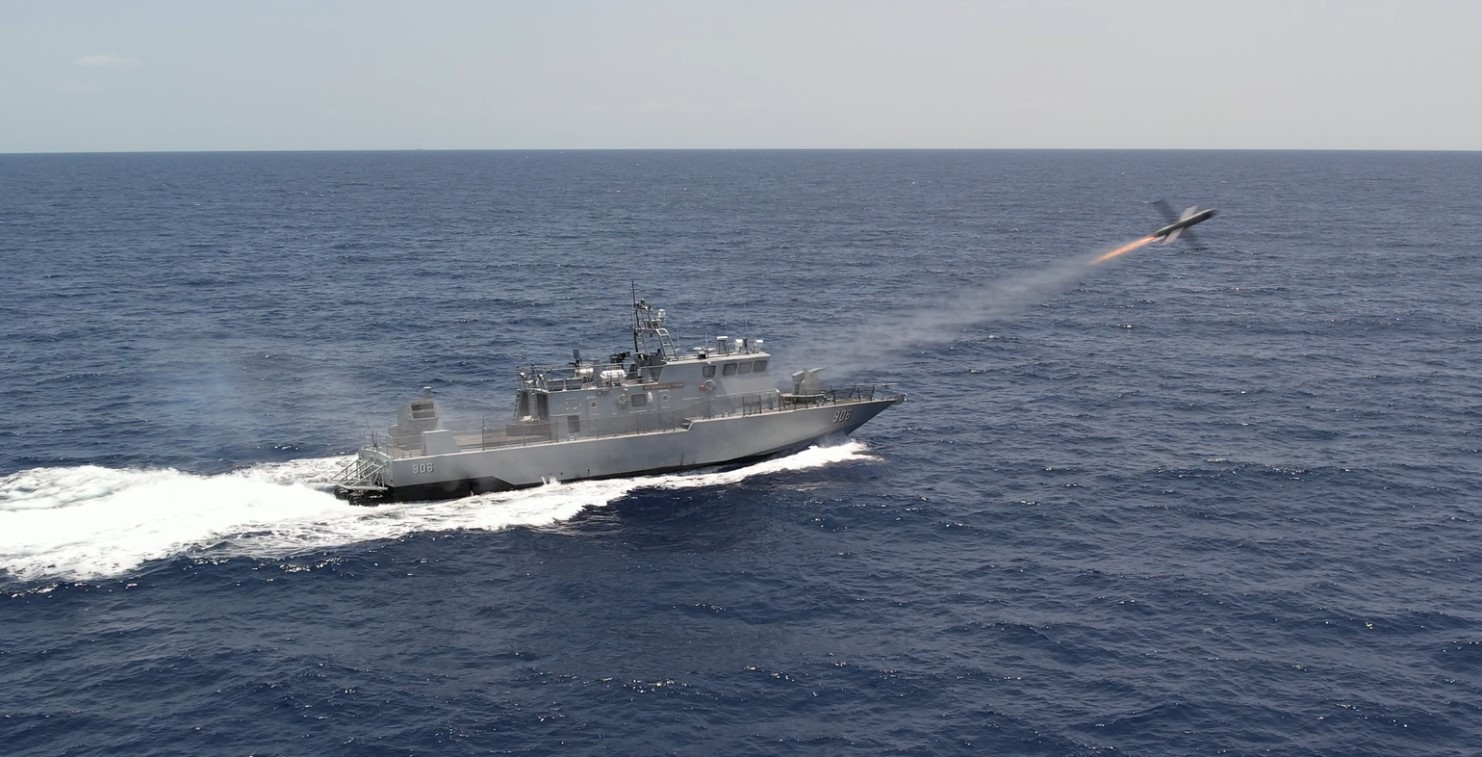
The BRP Herminigildo Yurong testing the Spike NLOS system.

The ship class is designed to carry one bow-mounted Mk.44 Bushmaster II autocannon mounted on Rafael Typhoon Mk 30-C remote-controlled weapon station, and two M2HB Browning 12.7 mm/50-caliber heavy machine guns mounted on Rafael Mini Typhoon remote-controlled weapon stations.

At least four of the ships will be installed with a Rafael Typhoon MLS-NLOS missile launcher for Spike-NLOS surface-to-surface missiles. All other boats are fitted for, but not with the system, and can be installed separately at any time.

A 5.2-meter rigid inflatable boat (RHIB) is stowed in the aft for those without the missile system, and is deployed using a 1,000-kilogram crane.

== Ships in class ==
Bow number	Ship name	Launched	Delivered	Commissioned	Service	Status	Notes
PG-200	BRP Nestor Acero	26 June 2022	6 September 2022	28 November 2022	Littoral Combat Force, Philippine Fleet	Active	
PG-201	BRP Lolinato To-Ong	26 June 2022	6 September 2022	28 November 2022	Littoral Combat Force, Philippine Fleet	Active	
PG-903	BRP Gener Tinangag		11 April 2023	26 May 2023	Littoral Combat Force, Philippine Fleet	Active	
PG-905	BRP Domingo Deluana		11 April 2023	26 May 2023	Littoral Combat Force, Philippine Fleet	Active	
PG-906	BRP Herminigildo Yurong		18 November 2023	21 May 2024	Littoral Combat Force, Philippine Fleet	Active	Armed with Spike-NLOS
PG-205	BRP Laurence Narag		18 November 2023	21 May 2024	Littoral Combat Force, Philippine Fleet	Active	Armed with Spike-NLOS
PG-908	BRP Tomas Campo		17 September 2024	13 November 2024	Littoral Combat Force, Philippine Fleet	Active	Armed with Spike-NLOS
PG-909	BRP Albert Majini		17 September 2024	20 May 2025	Littoral Combat Force, Philippine Fleet	Active	Armed with Spike-NLOS
PG-208	BRP Audrey Bañares			24 February 2026	Littoral Combat Force, Philippine Fleet	Active	

== Gallery ==
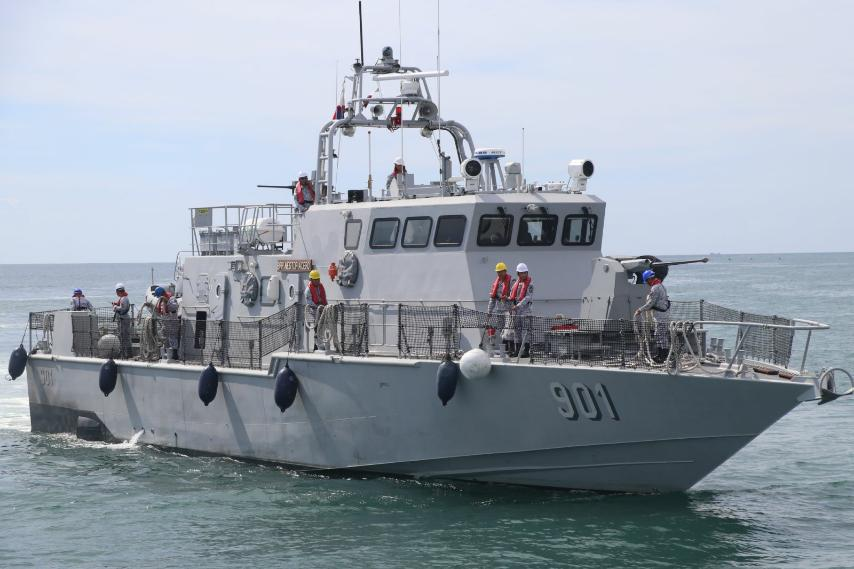
BRP Nestor Acero (PG-901)

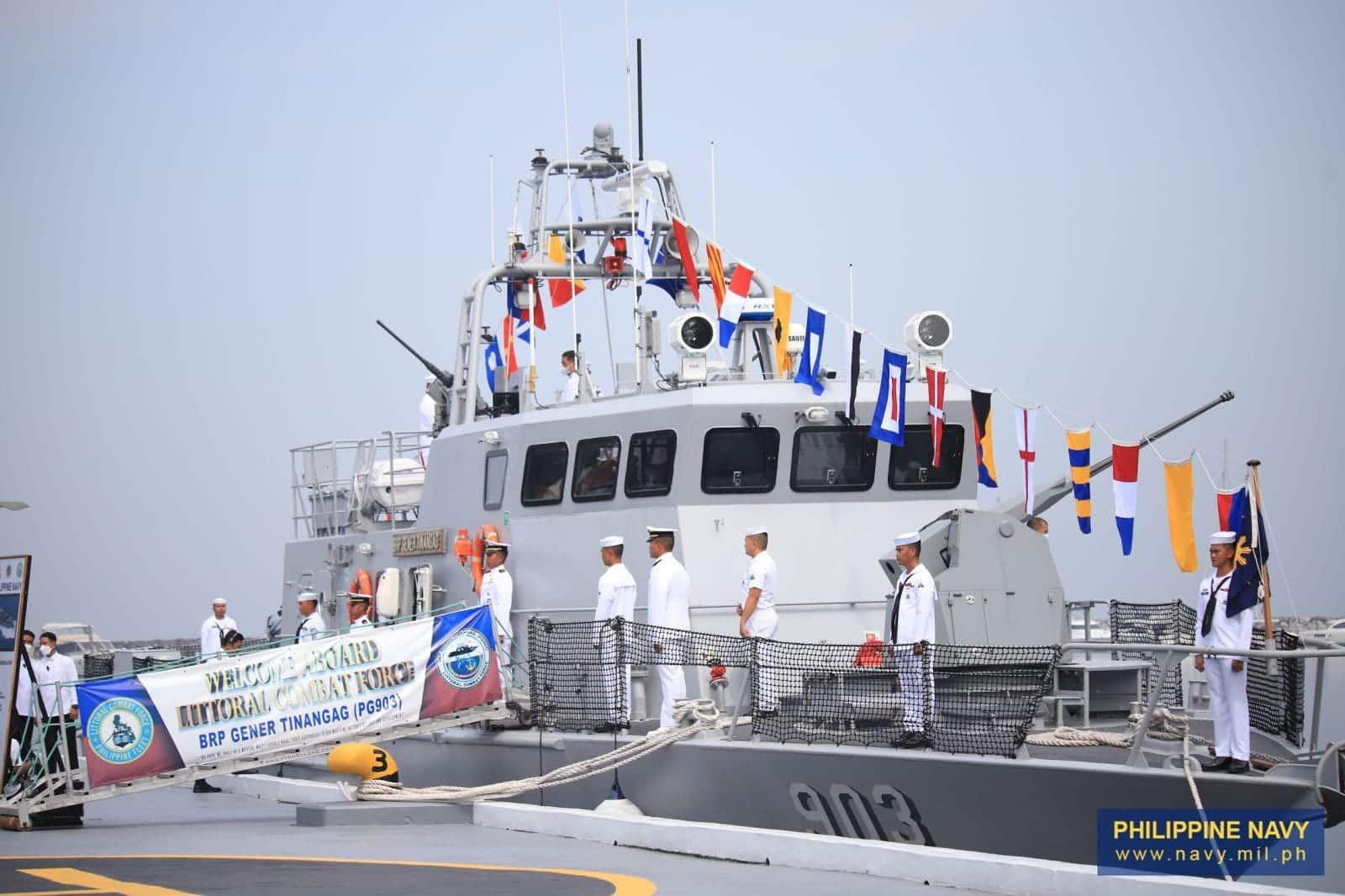
BRP Gener Tinangag (PG-903)

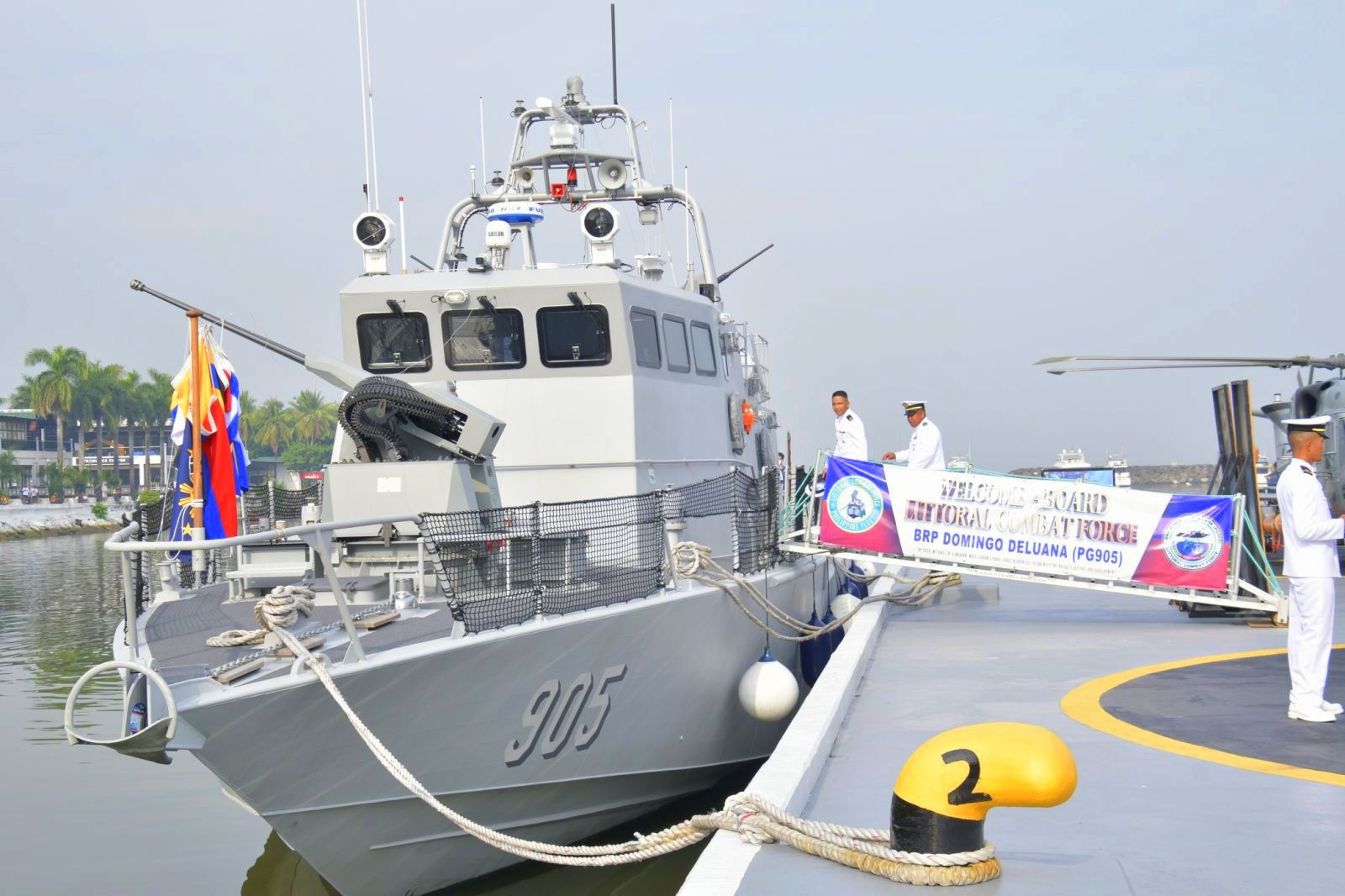
BRP Domingo Deluana (PG-905)

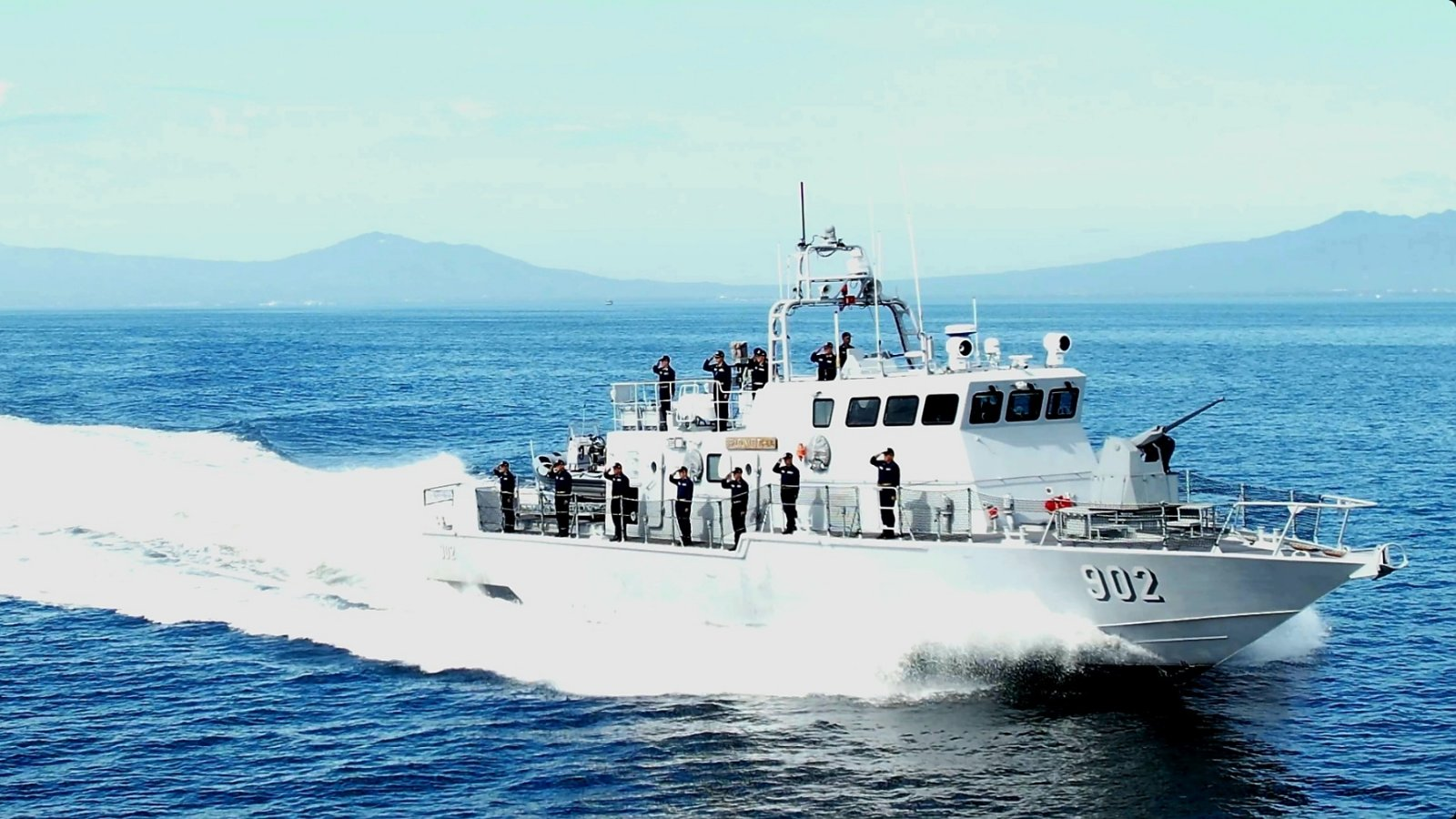
BRP Lolinato To-Ong (PG-902)
