= BRP Albert Majini =

Philippine Navy patrol vessel

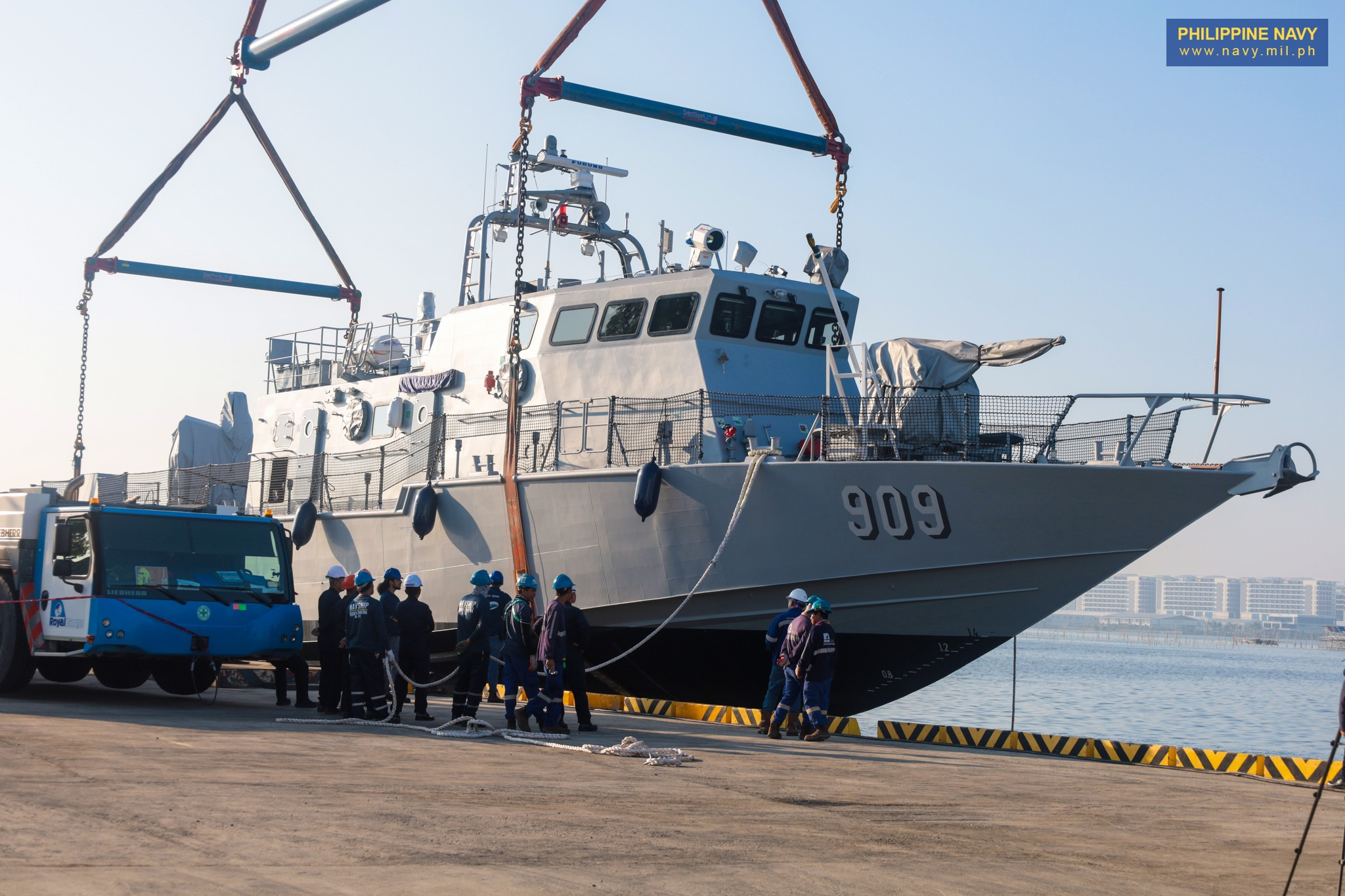
- BRP Albert Majini (PG-909)

History

Philippines
- Name: Albert Majini
- Namesake: Ensign Albert Majini PN
- Builder: Naval Station Pascual Ledesma
- Launched: 12 November 2024
- Commissioned: 20 May 2025
- Status: in active service

General characteristics
- Class & type: Acero-class gunboat
- Speed: greater than 40 knots (74 km/h) maximum

BRP Albert Majini is an Acero-class patrol vessel of the Philippine Navy. The first vessel of her kind to be assembled in the Philippines, she is named after AFP Medal of Valor recipient Albert Majini.

== History ==
BRP Albert Majini is one of the nine ships procured by the Philippine military from Israel Shipyards Ltd.. These vessels are fast attack interdiction craft missile (FAIC-M) ships falling under the Acero class.

Built at the naval shipyard at the Naval Station Pascual Ledesma in Cavite City. Albert Majini is hailed as the "first in-country" FAIC-M vessel assembled in the Philippines. Six Acero-class ships were already in service prior to the assembly of Albert Majini. She is the eighth overall Acero vessel.

Albert Majini formally had her launching ceremony on 12 November 2024.

On 20 May 2025, Albert Majini alongside BRP Miguel Malvar was commissioned at the Naval Operating Base in Subic Bay in commemoration of the Philippine Navy's 127th anniversary. Albert Majini is now part of the Navy's Littoral Combat Force.

== Namesake ==
BRP Albert Majini is named after a Philippine Navy gunnery officer who held the rank of ensign and was a posthumous recipient of the AFP Medal of Valor. A native of the Zamboanga Peninsula, a pier at the Naval Forces Western Mindanao's headquarters in Zamboanga City has also been named in his honor.
