= Camp Abubakar =

Philippine military base in Barira, Maguindanao del Norte

Camp Iranun
- Barira, Maguindanao del Norte in Philippines
- Logo of the Philippine Army

Site information
- Type: Army base
- Owner: Philippines
- Controlled by: Philippine Army

Location
- Location of Camp Iranun Camp Iranun (Philippines)
- Coordinates: 7°13′00″N 124°15′00″E
- Area: 13,000 hectares

Site history
- Built: 1980s
- Built by: Moro Islamic Liberation Front
- In use: 1980s–2000 (by MILF); 2000–present (by Philippine Army)
- Fate: Captured by the Philippine Army during the Battle of Camp Abubakar; renamed Camp Iranun and converted to Philippine Army use
- Battles/wars: Battle of Camp Abubakar
- Events: 2000 Philippine campaign against the Moro Islamic Liberation Front

Garrison information
- Garrison: 37th Infantry Battalion

Camp Iranun is a Philippine Army military base located in Barira, Maguindanao del Norte, Philippines. It is named after the Iranun people, a Moro ethnic group native to the area encompassing the boundaries of Maguindanao del Norte, Maguindanao del Sur, Lanao del Sur and Cotabato provinces.

Camp Iranun was once known as Camp Abubakar al Siddique, the largest Moro Islamic Liberation Front (MILF) camp, its largest settlement as well as the seat of its Shariah-based government. It was captured by government forces during the 2000 Philippine campaign against the MILF. Camp Abubakar had been named after Abu Bakr, a Sahabi and the father-in-law of the Islamic prophet Muhammad.

== As Camp Abubakar ==
Camp Abubakar was established in the 1980s by Salamat Hashim, after he and his comrades Murad Ebrahim and Mohagher Iqbal, broke away from the Moro National Liberation Front and Nur Misuari. Camp Abubakar covered approximately forty square miles and included a mosque, a madrasah, commercial and residential areas, a weapons factory, a solar energy system, and segments of seven different villages, including portions of the towns of Matanog, Barira, Buldon and Parang in Maguindanao del Norte province.

Salamat Hashim, then-Chairman of the MILF, resided in a bungalow inside the camp itself, while Murad Ebrahim, then-MILF military chief had his office in the town of Matanog. Camp Abubakar was a self-sufficient entity; agricultural produce from the surrounding farms sustained the MILF fighters garrisoned in the camp. It had small businesses and public markets, and residents paid a tax to the MILF.

== Philippine Army garrison ==
The Philippine Army's 603rd Infantry Brigade garrisoned Camp Iranun after the 2000 military campaign. The camp served as the brigade's headquarters until June 2015, when the unit relocated to Sultan Kudarat, Maguindanao del Norte. The Philippine Army's 37th Infantry Battalion then garrisoned Camp Iranun.

During the Presidency of Benigno Aquino III, Camp Iranun was considered as a possible storage depot for decommissioned firearms surrendered by the MILF as part of a peace deal being negotiated with the government as part of the Bangsamoro peace process.

== See also ==
- Battle of Camp Abubakar
- 2000 Philippine campaign against the Moro Islamic Liberation Front
