= Domingo Deluana =

Domingo J. Deluana
- Died: 30 April 2000; Matanog, Maguindanao, Philippines
- Military career
- Allegiance: Philippines
- Branch: Philippine Marine Corps
- Rank: Sergeant
- Service number: 709419
- Units: 9th Marine Battalion, Philippine Marine Corps
- Conflicts: 2000 Philippine campaign against the Moro Islamic Liberation Front; Moro conflict
- Awards: Medal of Valor

Domingo J. Deluana was an enlisted Marine of the Philippine Marine Corps and a posthumous recipient of the Philippines' highest military award for courage, the Medal of Valor. Sergeant Deluana served with the 9th Marine Battalion during the 2000 Philippine campaign against the Moro Islamic Liberation Front. In a military operation in Matanog, Maguindanao, Deluana and Marine officer Lolinato To-ong were themselves wounded while providing suppressive fire to cover the medical evacuation of wounded fellow Marines. Despite their wounds, they continued maneuvering and providing cover fire until a rocket propelled grenade blast hit the pair. Deluana and To-ong were killed in action.

== Medal of Valor citation ==
Sergeant Domingo J Deluana 709419 Philippine Navy (Marines)

"For acts of conspicuous courage and gallantry beyond the call of duty as members of the 52nd Marine Company, Force Reconnaissance Battalion and 9th Marine Battalion, Philippine Marine Corps, Philippine Navy during the assault on heavy fortified enemy bunkers at vicinity Poblacion Matanog, Maguindanao on 30 April 2000.

These military personnel fearlessly maneuvered towards the objective while observing keenly the surroundings for the safety of the whole team, when the troops were engaged in the fierce firefight, which started at dawn. Unmindful of their safety, these men applied their combat skills and immediately occupied a vantage position and exchange fire with the enemy inflicting numerous casualties. They maneuvered and transferred from one position to another while applying the fire and maneuver tactics to the extreme. At the time, when the overwhelming enemy reinforcement arrived and maneuvered, they showed their grit and steady composure by maneuvering to covered positions and firing at the enemies. When the wounded government troops were being extricated, these brave men provided the much-needed firepower to halt the enemy's advances which greatly eased the pressure on their comrades. Unmindful of their personal safety, these gallant men chose to hold their ground when the command "to withdraw" was given to protect their comrades. They provided once again the deadly cover fires to the withdrawing troops, inflicting numerous casualties to the advancing enemies. While providing fires, these courageous men were hit, unmindful of their wounds, maneuvered once more to another covered position and fired at the enemies until they were caught by the RPG blast which lifted their lifeless body momentarily from the ground. Their gallantry and act of heroism have greatly helped in extricating their wounded comrades thus minimizing casualties and preventing the possibility of total annihilation from the superior enemy forces. During the fierce encounter, the enemy sustained more casualties than the government troops. However, their courage and valor were not measured by the number of enemies killed and wounded, but rather by the number of their fellow soldiers saved.

By this display of heroism and selflessness, giving up their lives so that others may live, they gained the respect and admiration of the whole AFP. FIRST LIEUTENANT TO-ONG and Sergeant Deluana have incomparably distinguished themselves in combat which is in accordance with the finest tradition of Filipino Soldiery."
