= Gener Tinangag =

Soldier of the Philippine Army

- Born: 1993; Barlig, Mountain Province, Philippines
- Died: June 9, 2017 (aged 23–24); Marawi, Philippines
- Military career
- Allegiance: Philippines
- Branch: Philippine Marine Corps
- Rank: Corporal
- Units: Special Operations Platoon, Marine Battalion Landing Team 5
- Conflicts: Battle of Marawi
- Awards: Medal of Valor

Gener Tinangag was an enlisted marine of the Philippine Marine Corps and a recipient the Philippines' highest military award for courage, the Medal of Valor.

== Marawi siege ==
On May 23, 2017, a five-month-long battle between Philippine government security forces against militants affiliated with the Islamic State (IS), including the Maute and Abu Sayyaf Salafi jihadist groups began when a government operation to capture Isnilon Hapilon, an Abu Sayyaf commander, triggered a massive firefight.

Tinangag was an assistant automatic rifleman with the Special Operations Platoon (SOP), Marine Battalion Landing Team (MBLT)-5. His unit was among the initial responders to the Marawi crisis, and on June 9, 2017, MBLT-5 reinforced other Marine units in the vicinity of Mapandi Bridge in Lilod Madaya, Marawi City.

Tinangag and three other comrades were tasked with extricating dead and wounded Marines. When his companions went on a break, he decided to strike out on his own. His efforts paid off when he managed to rescue four wounded Marines and was in the process of retrieving the body of a slain lieutenant when he was hit by sniper fire and wounded by grenade fragments. Despite his wounds, he managed to make it back to safety with the lieutenant's body but later succumbed to his injuries.

His remains and those of twelve of his slain comrades were flown back to Manila on June 11, 2017.

== Medal of Valor citation ==
Portions of Tinangag's Medal of Valor citation, as reflected in AFP General Orders No. 813 dated May 31, 2021 noted,

"Through his outstanding bravery and unflinching determination in the face great adversity during the five-hour intense and deadly battle against the ISIS-inspired Local Terrorist Group – Maute, PFC Tinangag selflessly and single handedly saved the lives of four Marines and extricated one killed in action in exchange for his own life.

His selfless sacrifice raised the morale of troops to valiantly advanced in a ferocious battle and subsequently liberated Marawi City from the terrorists. By singular display of heroism, Private First Class Gener C Tinangag distinguished himself in combat, keeping with the traditions of Filipino soldiery."
