= Lolinato To-ong =

Philippine Marine Corps officer

Lolinato G. To-ong
- Died: 30 April 2000; Matanog, Maguindanao, Philippines
- Military career
- Allegiance: Philippines
- Branch: Philippine Marine Corps
- Rank: Captain
- Service number: 0-129481
- Units: 52nd Marine Company, Force Reconnaissance Battalion, Philippine Marine Corps
- Conflicts: 2000 Philippine campaign against the Moro Islamic Liberation Front; Moro conflict
- Awards: Medal of Valor

Lolinato G. To-ong was a Philippine Marine Corps officer and a posthumous recipient of the Philippines' highest military award for courage, the Medal of Valor. Then-First Lieutenant To-ong served with the 52nd Marine Company of the Force Reconnaissance Battalion during the 2000 Philippine campaign against the Moro Islamic Liberation Front. In a military operation in Matanog, Maguindanao, To-ong and enlisted Marine Domingo Deluana were themselves wounded while providing suppressive fire to cover the medical evacuation of wounded fellow Marines. Despite their wounds, they continued maneuvering and providing cover fire until an RPG blast caught the pair. To-ong and Deluana were killed in action.

Captain To-ong is buried in Section 1A at the Libingan ng mga Bayani in Taguig, Metro Manila.

The Philippine Navy's fast attack interdiction craft BRP Lolinato To-ong (PG-902) was named after Lt. To-ong.
