= Herminigildo Yurong =

Filipino military personnel (died 2000)

Herminigildo J. Yurong
- Died: 29 May 2000; Matanog, Maguindanao, Philippines
- Military career
- Allegiance: Philippines
- Branch: Philippine Marine Corps
- Rank: Staff Sergeant
- Service number: 709321
- Units: Marine Battalion Landing Team-2, Philippine Marine Corps
- Conflicts: 2000 Philippine campaign against the Moro Islamic Liberation Front; Moro conflict
- Awards: Medal of Valor

Herminigildo J. Yurong was an enlisted Marine of the Philippine Marine Corps and a posthumous recipient of the Philippines' highest military award for courage, the Medal of Valor. Staff Sergeant Yurong served as a platoon sergeant with Marine Battalion Landing Team-2's Special operations-capable unit during the 2000 Philippine campaign against the Moro Islamic Liberation Front. In a military operation in Matanog, Maguindanao, Yurong led his unit against approximately 200 Moro Islamic Liberation Front secessionists. Concluding that the numerically superior enemy would eventually pin down his unit, Yurong assaulted the entrenched MILF positions, emboldening his fellow Marines to follow his lead. As the MILF fighters counter-attacked, an RPG round impacted near his position, killing him.

== Medal of Valor citation ==
Staff Sergeant Herminigildo J Yurong 709321 Philippine Navy (Marines)

"For acts of conspicuous, gallantry and intrepidity at the risk of life above and beyond the call of duty while serving as Platoon Sergeant, Special Operation Capable Unit, Marine Battalion Landing Team-2, Philippine Marine Corps, Philippine Navy during the conduct of combat operation against more or less 200 MILF rebels at Langkong, Matanog, Maguindanao in consonance with the execution of MBLT-2 OPORD 05-2k (Warrior Shield) on 29 May 2000.

Fully aware that the enemy overwhelming firepower and numerical superiority will eventually overwhelm his pinned down platoon, Staff Sergeant Yurong, with utter disregard for his life made a decisive move towards the enemy and single-handedly delivered volume of fire upon the enemy's advanced position to clear the way for his beleaguered platoon. The daring move of Staff Sergeant Yurong bolstered the morale of his platoon, which subsequently, emboldened them to rally behind him against the well-entrenched rebels. Under the hail of heavy enemy fire and relentless RPG attacks, he audaciously moved from one hasty cover to another across the line of fire, crawling, leapfrogging, delivering potent accurate counter-fire, and throwing grenades towards every enemy position. Alone in the advance position, he repulsed the enemy counterattack almost single-handedly. It was unfortunate, however, that in the last instance, an RPG round found its mark near his position. The blast wounded him fatally which caused his instantaneous death. His death was not in vain, as his men witnessed what happened to him, the more that they fiercely and relentlessly fought the MILF rebels and sustained the momentum established by Staff Sergeant Yurong. His singular act, aggressive and vicious attacks against the enemy positions destabilized the MILF fighters who later on withdrew, leaving behind 11 enemies killed while undetermined number of wounded enemies were dragged along by their comrades. After scouring the area, 4 M16 rifles, 1 RPG launcher with 5 rounds of ammo, 1 90MM RR with 2 rounds of Ammo, 1 M16 magazine, assorted clothing and food supplies were recovered.

By these gallant deed, Staff Sergeant Yurong distinguished himself in combat in the finest traditions of Filipino soldiery."
