= Salamat Hashim =

Filipino militant leader (1939–2003)

Salamat Hashim سلامت هاشم
- Born: July 7, 1939; Midsayap, Cotabato, Philippine Commonwealth
- Died: July 13, 2003 (aged 64); Butig, Lanao del Sur, Philippines
- Education: Al-Azhar University
- Occupation: Militant
- Known for: Founder and leader of the Moro Islamic Liberation Front
- Children: 5

Salamat Hashim (Maguindanaon pronunciation: [salaːmat haːʃɪm]; Jawi: سلامت هاشم; July 7, 1939 – July 13, 2003), also known as Hashim Salamat, was a Filipino militant who was the founder and leader of the Moro Islamic Liberation Front.

== Early life and education ==
Hashim was born in Midsayap, Cotabato (now Pagalungan, Maguindanao del Sur) on July 7, 1939, to a religious family, one of seven siblings. At age six, he was taught by his mother how to read the Quran. In the 1950s, Hashim received formal elementary and high school education and was an honor student.

In 1958, Hashim joined the Hajj and decided to stay in Mecca to be mentored by Sheikh Zawawi. He was a regular attendee of the halaqat at the Masjid al Haram. He also underwent studies at the Madrasat as-Sulatiyah ad-Diniyah.

The following year, Hashim moved to Cairo to pursue further studies. He enrolled at Al-Azhar University, where he earned a bachelor's degree in theology, majoring in Aqeedah and Philosophy in 1967, and a post-graduate masters degree from the same university in 1969. He also pursued a doctorate degree but was not able to finish writing his dissertation due to his decision to return to the Philippines to organize a Moro revolutionary movement.

== Militant career ==
Hashim along with other militants including Nur Misuari founded the Moro National Liberation Front (MNLF) in the 1970s. Hashim later left the group in the later part of the decade to form the Moro Islamic Liberation Front (MILF). Salamat split from the MNLF due to ideological and political disagreements with Nur Misuari Hashim explained that he spilt away from the MNLF because it was drifting away from Islamic based to a Marxist-Maoist orientation

== Death ==
Hashim died on July 13, 2003, while in one of the MILF's camps in Butig, Lanao del Sur, due to complications caused by a heart disease and acute ulcer. The MILF only publicly confirmed their leader's death days later on August 5. Murad Ebrahim succeeded Hashim as leader of the MILF.

== Legacy ==
Hashim is considered as a key figure in the Bangsamoro fight for self-determination. His former house in Camp Abubakar has also become a tourist destination.

The Salamat Excellence Award for Leadership (SEAL) instituted by Parliament Bill 355 in 2025 is named after him.

== Books ==
- The Bangsamoro Mujahid : his objectives and responsibilities, 1985.
- The Bangsamoro people's struggle against oppression and colonialism, 2001.
- Referendum : peaceful, civilized, democratic, and diplomatic means of solving the Mindanao conflict, 2002.
