= 2000 Philippine campaign against the Moro Islamic Liberation Front =

Anti-secession military campaign

- Part of the Moro conflict
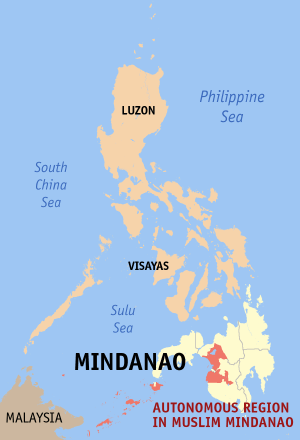
- The 2000 Philippine campaign against the Moro Islamic Liberation Front predominantly took place in areas within the Autonomous Region in Muslim Mindanao.
Date	March 21, 2000 – July 9, 2000 (3 months, 2 weeks and 4 days)
Location	Autonomous Region in Muslim Mindanao, Philippines 7.216667°N 124.25°E
Result	Indecisive: Philippine Government fails to weaken the MILF's military capabilities; Philippine government fails to neutralize the Moro Islamic Liberation Front; Philippine Army neutralizes 46 camps of the Moro Islamic Liberation Front including Camp Abubakar; Moro Islamic Liberation Front regroups and establishes new camps; Escalation of the humanitarian crisis in the Autonomous Region in Muslim Mindanao

Belligerents
Philippines	Moro Islamic Liberation Front

Commanders and leaders
Joseph Estrada (President); Gen. Angelo Reyes (Chief of Staff of the Armed Forces of the Philippines); Lt. Gen Diomedio Villanueva (Commanding General of the Philippine Army); Lt. Gen Benjamin Defensor (Commanding General of the Philippine Air Force); VAdm Elonor Padre (Flag Officer-in-Command of the Philippine Navy); Capt. Lolinato To-ong †; Tech Sgt. Claudio Forrosuelo †; Staff Sgt. Herminigildo Yurong †	Salamat Hashim; Murad Ebrahim; Ameril Umbra Kato; Abdullah Makapaar (WIA); Samer Salamat †; Omar Untong †; Edor Carip Elias †; Kamlon Macader †; "Commander Tiger" †; Unknown brigade commander †; Unknown brigade commander †

Units involved
Armed Forces of the Philippines; Philippine Army; Philippine Air Force; Philippine Navy; Philippine Marine Corps	Bangsamoro Islamic Armed Forces (BIAF)

Strength
50,000 – 70,000 infantry; 1,000 airmen	15,690 infantry

Casualties and losses
200 killed (Philippine military claim) 810 killed 2,156 injured 90 missing 3 Simba-type tanks destroyed 1 Huey helicopter destroyed	300-471 killed (Philippine military claim) Unknown killed
- 425 civilian casualties (from crossfire or MILF bombs); 755,000 – 1 million civilians displaced

The 2000 Philippine campaign against the Moro Islamic Liberation Front or "all out war" was a military campaign conducted by the Armed Forces of the Philippines (AFP) against a Muslim secessionist group that took place during the presidency of Joseph Estrada in the Autonomous Region in Muslim Mindanao in the Philippines. The campaign was waged "to weaken the Moro Islamic Liberation Front's capability to undermine the territorial integrity of the Philippines and inflict harm on both government personnel and civilians".

== Background ==
The Moro Islamic Liberation Front (MILF), a faction of the Moro National Liberation Front (MNLF) which broke away in 1977, had signed a ceasefire agreement and begun talks with the Philippine government in 1997 after the MNLF affirmed the 1996 Final Peace Agreement. The MILF, however, ultimately rejected the 1996 Final Peace Agreement as inadequate, reiterating a demand for a "Bangsamoro Islamic State", and not just simple political autonomy.

The MILF continued recruiting additional members, increasing its armaments and fortifying its camps. It also began assuming territories of its own within the Philippine Republic and took on the role of government in control of these territories. The MILF taxed the residents of these areas and an armed wing, which it called the Bangsamoro Islamic Armed Forces, secured the perimeter of its camps. Prior to April 2000, the MILF had been allowed to operate approximately 50 camps that were off limits to government soldiers. When the MILF finally broke off peace talks, the Armed Forces of the Philippines, the Philippine Army in particular, began attacking and destroying these camps one after the other.

The administration of Philippine President Joseph Estrada advocated a hardline stance against the MILF, directing the Armed Forces of the Philippines to "go all out" against the MILF on March 21, 2000, after the secessionist group invaded the town of Kauswagan, Lanao del Norte and took hundreds of residents hostage.

== Military operations ==
Philippine Marines Praying prior Military campaigns during 2000 in Central Mindanao

The AFP modified its primary internal security operation plan, Balangai, shifting attention from the communist insurgency to the Muslim secessionists. The AFP Southern Command, responsible for the areas in which the MILF operated, prepared contingency plan Sovereign Shield.

Eight military operations were prepared and implemented as the campaign progressed. These were:

=== Preliminary operations ===
==== Operation Valiancy ====
The 6th Infantry Division of the Philippine Army moved against the MILF forces in the Talayan-Shariff Aguak-Datu Piang area in Maguindanao (now Maguindanao del Sur) and captured Camp Omar, its third largest camp located there. Camp Omar served as the headquarters of the 206th BIAF brigade under Ameril Umbra Kato and defended by 500 guerrillas. Camp Jabal Uhob, another MILF camp was also captured during the operation, which took two days.

==== Operation Audacity ====
Philippine Army units moved to free the Carmen-Banilasan complex in the province of Cotabato from MILF presence and deny their freedom of movement in the area. The operation met its objective.

=== Operations in response to occupation of towns and seizure of roadways ===
==== Operation Sovereign ====
The MILF launched attacks on the coastal areas of Lanao del Norte in the middle of March 2000. They blocked the Cagayan de Oro-Iligan-Kapatagan national highway and forces under the 303rd BIAF brigade under the command of Abdullah Makapaar occupied the municipal halls of Kauswagan and Munai towns. This action by the MILF prompted President Joseph Estrada to "throw the full might of the armed forces on these terrorists".

The Philippine Army's 4th Infantry Division moved to capture the MILF's Camp Bilal in Munai. Other MILF satellite camps were also captured in the operation which took 45 days.

==== Operation Dominance ====
The MILF established checkpoints on the Narciso Ramos Highway in Kauswagan, Lanao del Norte and began collecting "toll fees" from those using the roadway. In response the AFP launched operations Dominance and Freeway with the objective of reasserting government control over the highway and free it from MILF control. The 6th Infantry Division was met by a 1000 MILF men contingent which defended from bunkers lining the highway. This came to be known as the Battle of Matanog.

==== Operation Freeway ====
This operation was the complement of Operation Dominance with the same objectives.

=== Operations aimed at capture of Camp Abubakar ===
==== Operation Grand Sweeper ====
Operation Grand Sweeper was aimed at capturing the MILF satellite camps exerting control over the towns along Lake Lanao.

==== Operation Supreme ====
Operation Supreme's objective was the capture of the MILF's second-largest base, Camp Busrah, which was defended by an 800-man MILF unit. The camp was eventually found abandoned when government troops made their final assault.

==== Operation Terminal Velocity ====
Operation Terminal Velocity's objective was the capture of Camp Abubakar, the largest MILF base and seat of its Shariah-based government.

== Aftermath ==
Operation Terminal Velocity, the final phase of the military campaign to reassert Philippine sovereignty over the areas occupied by the MILF, proved successful after Camp Abubakar, the "center of gravity" of the MILF organization, was captured in early July 2000. Then-President Joseph Estrada himself visited the captured Muslim rebel camp and raised the Philippine flag there, "in assertion of sovereignty". He brought truckloads of lechon and beer for the government troops, earning criticism from both devout Muslims and Catholic clerics for his insensitivity.

The campaign may have been successful from a military viewpoint, however, various authors have pointed out that the bulk of the MILF's manpower survived the clashes with the government forces and later began to re-establish camps and recruit more members; the MILF "lived to fight another day". Furthermore, the concentration of government military assets towards the Mindanao area siphoned off manpower and equipment from the Luzon and Visayas island groups, providing the communist rebellion an opportunity to assert itself.

Estrada later ordered that criminal charges against MILF leaders accused of bombings and massacres be withdrawn in an attempt to lure them back to the negotiating table. An impeachment trial against Estrada on charges of bribery was initiated in November 2000 but was aborted in January 2001 when the impeachment court voted not to open an envelope purportedly containing evidence incriminating the President, setting in motion the Second EDSA Revolution.

The 2000 Mindanao campaign against the Moro Islamic Liberation Front cost the Philippine government Php 6 billion, approximately US$126 million at the September 2016 exchange rate.

== See also ==
- Moro conflict
- Bangsamoro peace process
- Trial of Joseph Estrada
