= Shaldag-class patrol boat =

Class of patrol boats of Israeli Navy

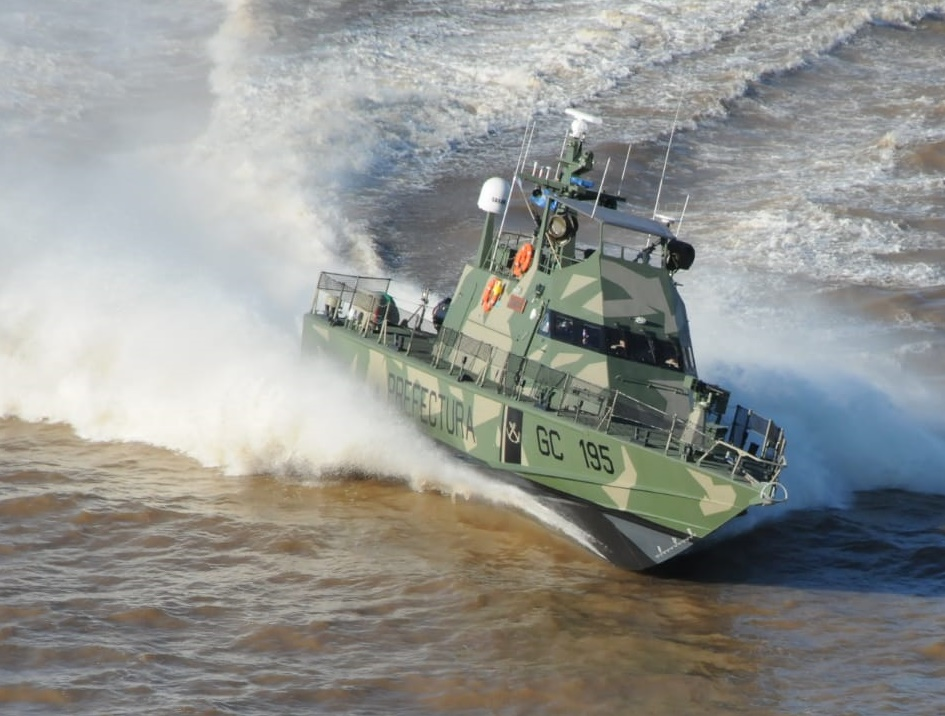
- An Argentinian Shaldag-class patrol boat

Class overview
- Name: Shaldag
- Builders: Israel Shipyards Ltd.
- Operators: See Operators
- Subclasses: See Subclasses
- Built: 1989–present
- In commission: 1989–present

General characteristics
- Type: Fast patrol boat
- Displacement: 72 tons
- Length: 24.8 m (81 ft 4 in)
- Beam: 6.0 m (19 ft 8 in)
- Draught: 1.2 m (3 ft 11 in)
- Propulsion: 2 × MTU 12V 396 TE engines; 2 × steerable KaMeWa water jets
- Speed: 50 knots (93 km/h; 58 mph) max
- Capacity: up to 6 tons
- Complement: 15
- Armament: 1 × Typhoon Weapon System with 25 mm (1.0 in) gun; 1 × Oerlikon 20 mm cannon; 2 × 0.5-inch general purpose machine guns; Depth charges

The Shaldag-class patrol boat (Hebrew: שלדג, Kingfisher) is a small but fast class of patrol boats developed for the Israeli Navy and launched in 1989, it has since seen service with several other navies.

It is designed for security tasks where high intercept speeds are required, such as interdiction of terrorism and illegal smuggling. Its salient features are high speed in rough seas, with good seakeeping and outstanding manoeuvrability, exceptionally low slamming in all sea states, dry decks at all speeds and very spacious and accessible internal arrangement.

== History ==
The Shaldag class was conceptualized by Israel Shipyards in response to request from the Israeli Navy for a fast patrol boat to protect Israeli waters from terrorist threats.

== Design and construction ==
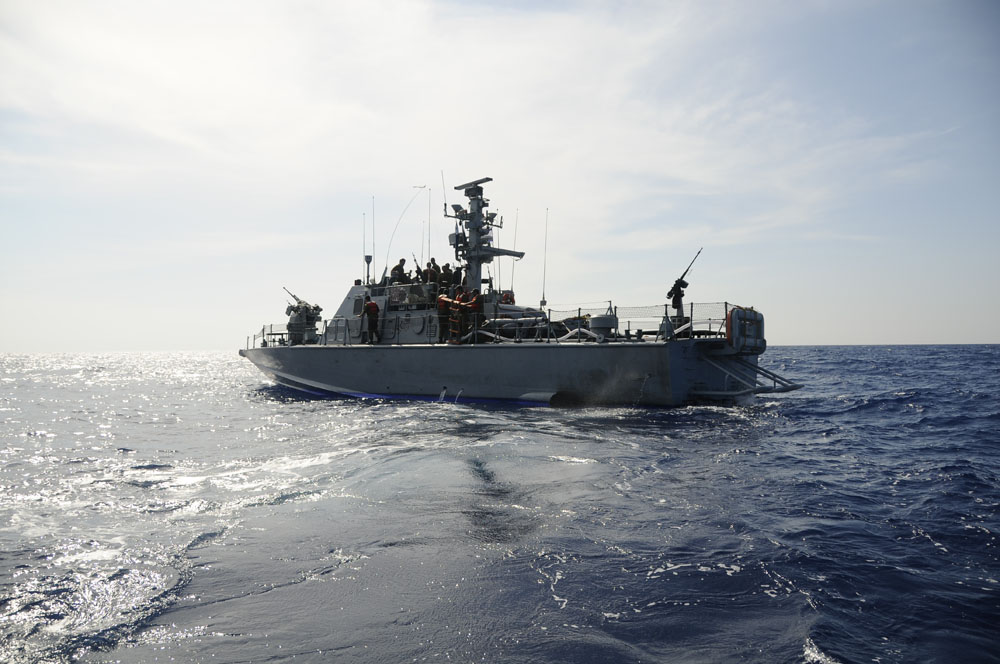
Shaldag-class fast patrol boat of the Israeli Navy in the Mediterranean Sea

The hull, deck and deckhouse are of welded marine aluminium alloy, with transverse frames and longitudinals. Integral double bottom tanks contain fuel with an additional gravity fuel tank at the center. The hull is divided into six watertight compartments which meet strict international flooded damage stability criteria.

=== Armament ===
The vessels are armed with a Typhoon Weapon Station, mounting a Bushmaster M242 and electro-optics systems. They are equipped with foredeck and aftdeck rings for Oerlikon 20 mm cannon and a single gun mount. There are mounts for 0.5-inch machine guns on both sides of the main deck. The boat is able to accommodate most advanced new weapon systems, such as the rapid-fire stabilized gun mount, remotely controlled by a night vision system.

The Shaldag Mark II variants are equipped with Spike ER surface to surface missiles.

== Operators ==
=== Military operators ===
- Equatorial Guinea: Operated by Equatorial Guinean Navy.
- Israel: Operated by Israeli Navy.
- Nigeria: Operated by the Nigerian Navy.
- Philippines: Operated by the Philippine Navy. Known locally as the Nestor Acero-class Fast Attack Interdiction Crafts.
- Senegal: Purchased for the Senegalese Navy.
- Sri Lanka: 7 used by the Sri Lankan Navy.

=== Law enforcement agencies ===
- Argentina: Used by Argentine Naval Prefecture. 4 Shaldag Mk IIs.
- Azerbaijan: Purchased for the State Border Service (Azerbaijan).
- Cyprus: Used by Cyprus Port and Marine Police.
- Romania: Three Shaldag Mk IVs with Romanian Border Police.

==== Potential civilian operators ====
- Philippines: The Philippine Coast Guard has considered the use of the Shaldag Mk II.

== Subclasses ==
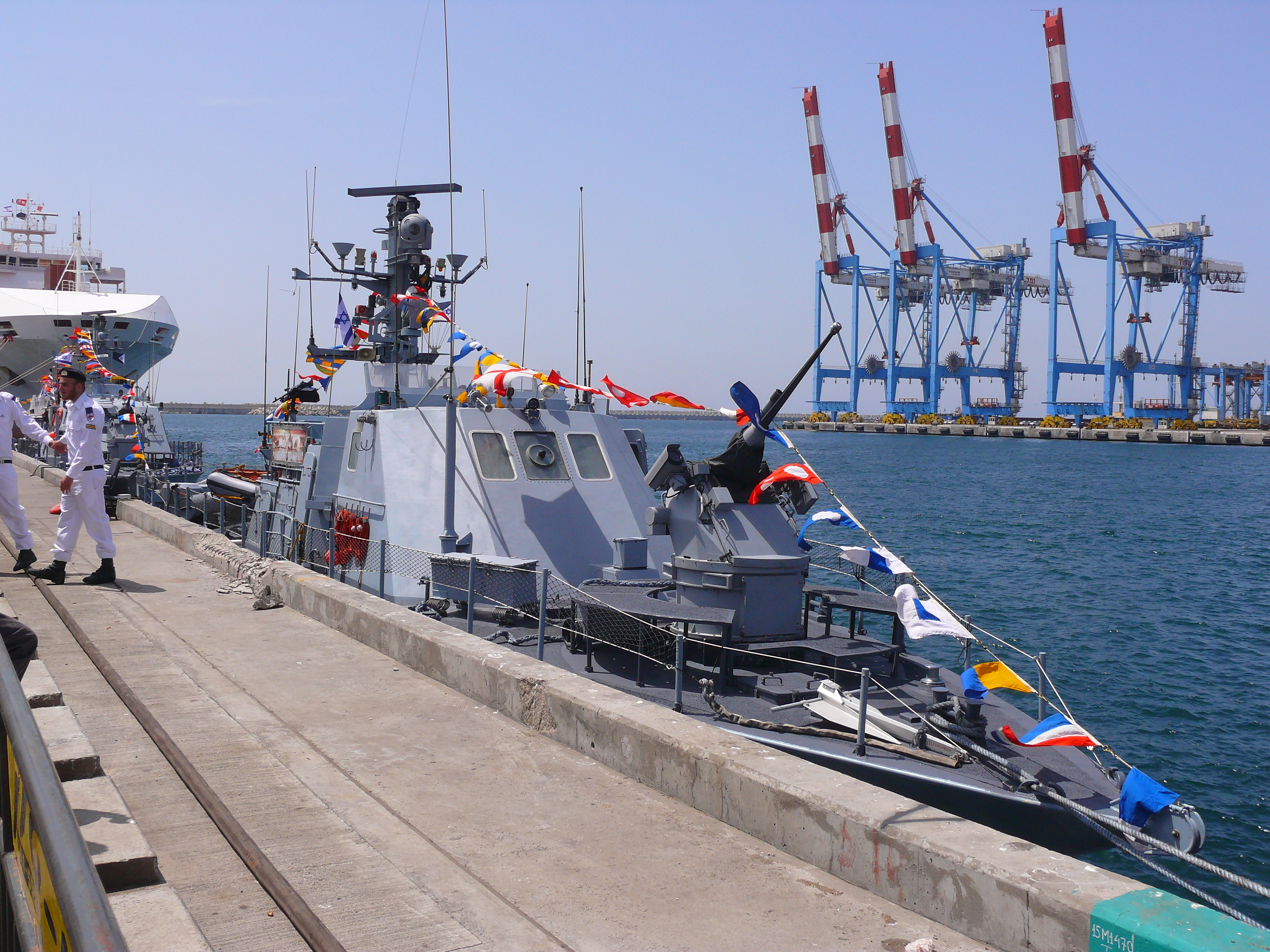
Shaldag Mk I

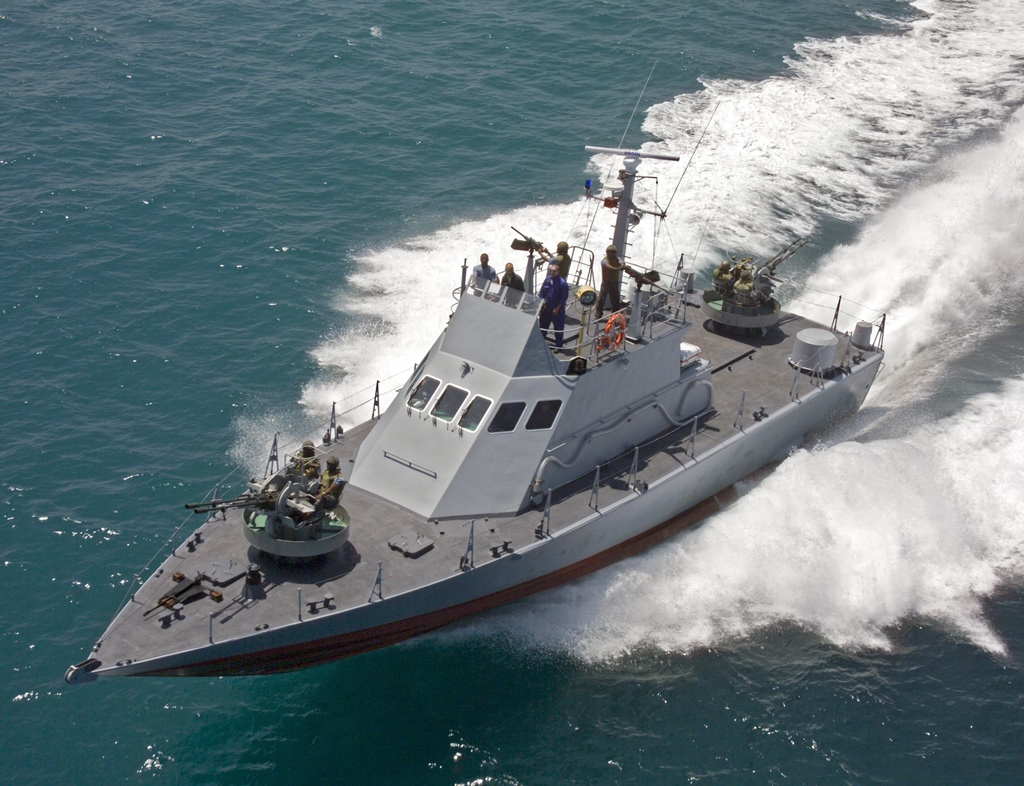
Shaldag Mk II

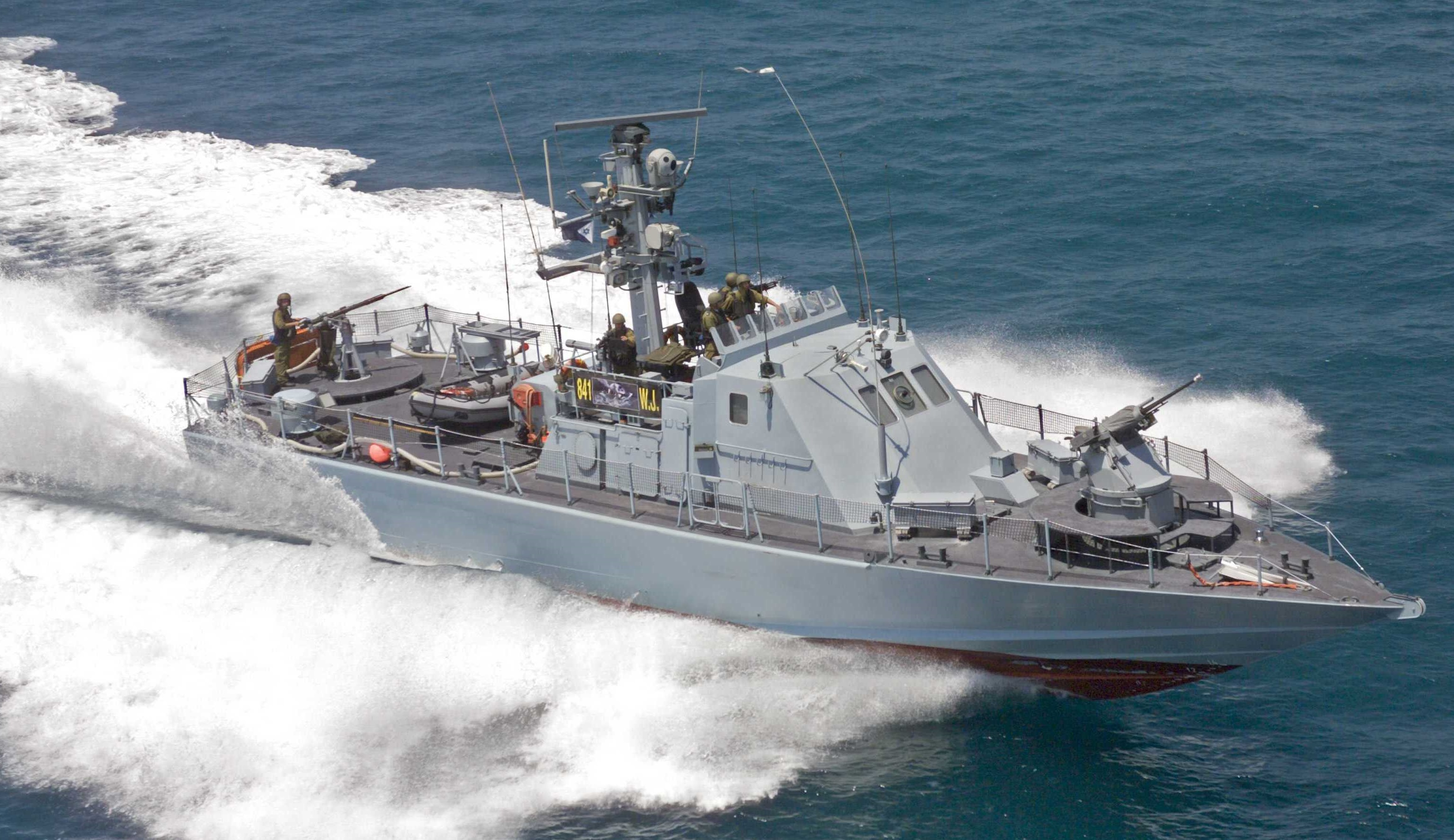
Shaldag Mk III

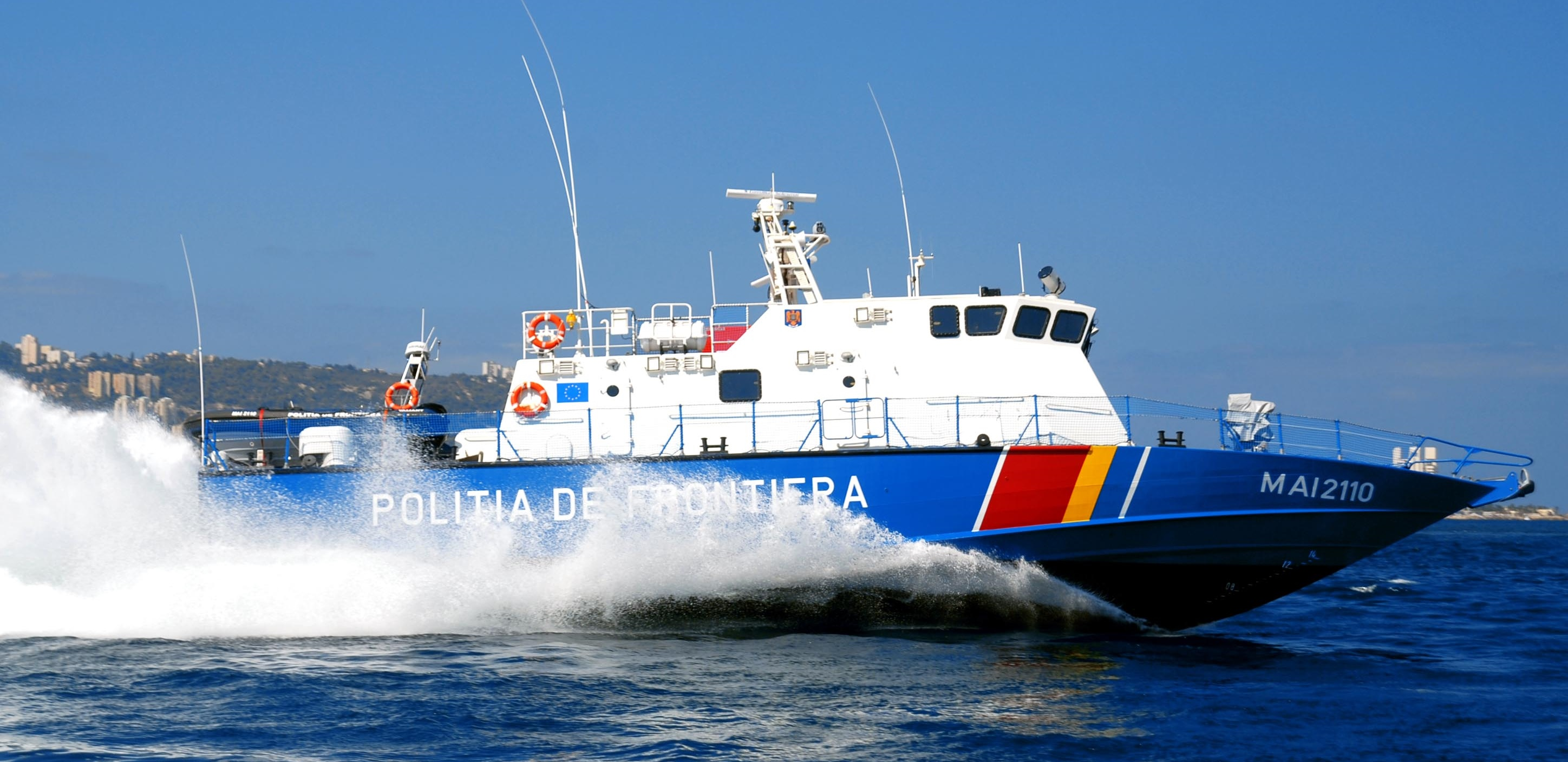
Shaldag Mk IV

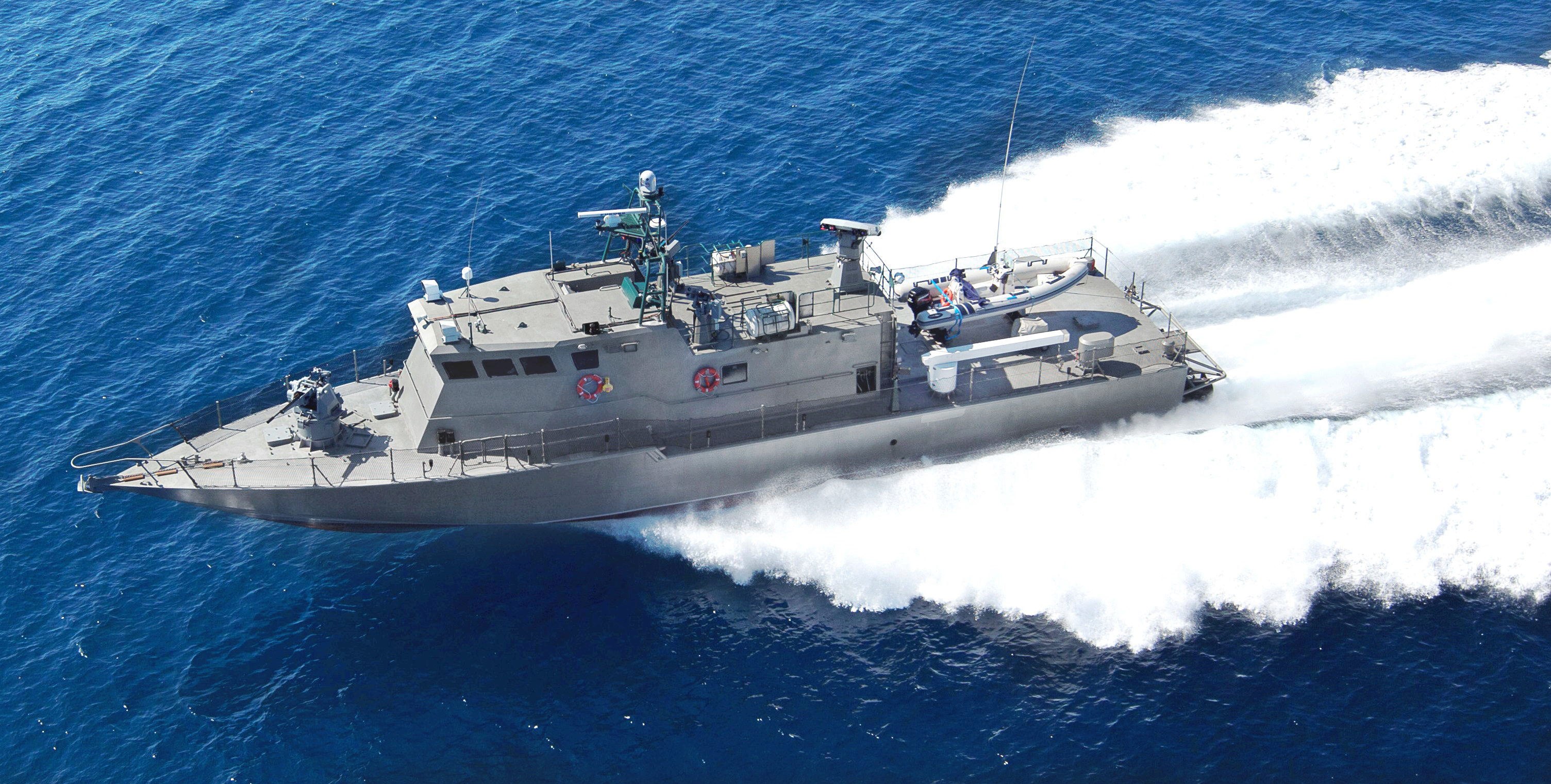
Shaldag Mk V
