= Custodio Parcon =

Philippine Marine Corps general officer

Custodio J. Parcon, Jr.
- Military career
- Allegiance: Philippines
- Branch: Philippine Marine Corps
- Service years: 1987–2019
- Rank: Brigadier General
- Service number: 0-9702
- Commands: Joint Task Force Tawi-Tawi; 2nd Marine Brigade, Philippine Marine Corps
- Conflicts: Moro conflict
- Awards: Medal of Valor

Custodio J. Parcon, Jr. is a retired Philippine Marine Corps general officer and a recipient the Philippines' highest military award for courage, the Medal of Valor. He is the current commander of Joint Task Force Tawi-Tawi.

== Early life and education ==
Parcon is a native of Iloilo City, Philippines. He is a graduate of the Philippine Military Academy Class of 1987. He completed high school at Central Philippine University in 1980.

== Action against the Abu Sayyaf ==
On 21 February 1993, members of a breakaway faction of the Moro National Liberation Front kidnapped Anthony Luis Biel, the 5-year-old grandson of a Basilan businessman. The following month on 18 March 1993, the Moro militants abducted a Spanish Claretian missionary priest, Bernardo Blanco as he drove to his parish church in Isabela, Basilan. Negotiations for Blanco's release bogged down as the Abu Sayyaf entered the scene and demanded ₱14 million as ransom. An operation aimed at rescuing the hostages spearheaded by the Philippine Marine Corps began on 3 May 1993. On 6 May 1993 Blanco managed to escape his captors. The Marines led by Parcon continued their push toward the militants' Camp Al-Madinah, where Abu Sayyaf fighters led by Isnilon Hapilon and allegedly Wahab Akbar engaged them in combat.

Parcon's unit eventually killed 46 Abu Sayyaf militants and Biel was released. Parcon was conferred the Medal of Valor in 1994 for his actions during the operation.

=== Medal of Valor citation ===
CAPTAIN CUSTODIO J PARCON JR 0-9702 PHILIPPINE NAVY (MARINES)

"For conspicuous gallantry and intrepidity at the risk of life above and beyond the call of duty during a series of encounters against heavily armed Muslim Kidnapers at Barangay Kapayawan, Isabela, Basilan, from 7 to 15 May 1993. As the Commanding Officer, 61st Marine Reconnaissance Company tasked to infiltrate the Abu Sayyaf Camp Al Madinah and rescue victim Anthony Biel III, CAPTAIN PARCON JR led his men on a hazardous mission, pitting them against extremely fanatic and suicidal armed elements.

Infiltrating into the fortified enemy camp under cover of darkness, he and his men deactivated hundreds of mines laid along their route. On 8 May, he and his men engaged six armed enemies, instantly killing two and wounding two others. Through skillful direction of friendly fires maneuver, his men evaded detection and saved confusion within the enemy lines while dislodging Abu Sayyaf elements from each bunker in close quarter battle.

The next day, he saw armed men preparing for a counterattack. Employing accurate sniper fire, he and his men neutralized four kidnappers and wounded several others who scampered in various directions. At about 1500H on that same day, they were ambushed by the main body of Abu Sayyaf mujahideens, pinning down one section of his men in the middle of the enemy's killing zone. Unable to maneuver under intense enemy fire, he crawled towards the main enemy force amidst hail of machine gun and mortar fires, knocking down single-handedly the enemy bunkers along the way.

With enemy fires concentrated on his direction, his men were able to get out of the killing zone to deliver covering fires for his advance. He crept close to the enemy, lobbed a smoke grenade at their position to give the supporting helicopter gunship a clearer target. Finally, on 10 May, he and his men made the final assault on the enemy's main headquarters, which was defended by a 50 caliber heavy machinegun that delivered devastating fires on the advancing troops. Again, he single-handedly maneuvered forward and deliver fatal burst of fire to the enemy gunner, making the last defense of the Abu Sayyaf group to collapse, and forcing the remaining enemies to scamper in different directions, bringing with them their dead and wounded.

The capture of Camp Al Madinah and the neutralization of 46 Abu Sayyaf extremists greatly pressured the enemy to release Luis Anthony Biel III. Recovered from the camp were one 50 caliber machine gun, one light anti-tank weapon, two R2 Carbine rifle, one M1 Garand rifle, undetermined number of live mortar rounds, several land mines/bombs, and voluminous documents. By these achievements, CAPTAIN PARCON distinguished himself in combat in keeping with the finest traditions of Filipino soldiery."

== Notable events ==
In July 2006 Parcon, then a lieutenant colonel, resigned from his post as operations chief of the Philippine Marine Corps due to allegations that he was included among the officers recommended for court martial proceedings related to the 2006 state of emergency in the Philippines.

== See also ==
- Ariel Querubin
