= Ariel Querubin =

Philippine retired military official and politician (born 1956)

Colonel Ariel O. Querubin
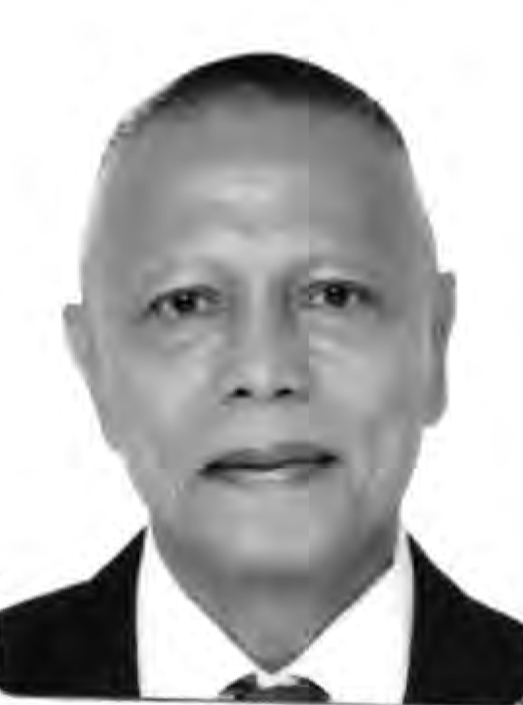
- Querubin’s photo in his 2024 Certificate of Candidacy for Senator

Personal details
- Born: 28 March 1956 (age 70) Dagupan, Pangasinan, Philippines
- Party: Nacionalista
- Spouse: Maria Flor Palacio Azcarraga-Querubin
- Children: 5
- Education: Philippine Military Academy; University of Canberra
- Occupation: Politician, retired soldier

Military service
- Allegiance: Philippines
- Branch/service: Philippine Marine Corps
- Years of service: 1979–2010
- Rank: Colonel
- Unit: Philippine Marine Corps
- Commands: Marine Battalion Landing Team-1; 1st Marine Brigade
- Battles/wars: Communist rebellion in the Philippines; Moro conflict 1989 Philippine coup attempt 2000 Philippine campaign against the Moro Islamic Liberation Front
- Awards: Medal of Valor; Distinguished Conduct Star; Distinguished Service Star (3); Gold Cross (7); Military Merit Medal (12)

Ariel Porfirio Oliva Querubin (born March 28, 1956) is a retired Philippine Marine Corps officer and a recipient of the Philippines' highest military award for courage, the Medal of Valor. He is highly decorated soldier in the Philippines and was placed in various positions in the military prior to his retirement in 2010.

== Early life and education ==
Querubin was born in Dagupan, Pangasinan. He grew up in La Union and studied in Manila.

In his youth, Querubin found himself involved in various misadventures. These youthful indiscretions nearly prevented him from graduating from the Philippine Military Academy. However, this experience helped temper his exuberance, and by the time he graduated, his academic performance allowed him to choose which branch of the military he would serve in. Querubin met his wife, Pong Azcarraga, while still in service with the Marines. Pong had two young sons from a previous relationship: Martin Loon, now the CEO of Cocolife, and John Michael Loon, a highly decorated marine officer who graduated from the Philippine Military Academy and served in the Battle of Marawi in 2017. Together, Querubin and Pong have four children: Alfred, Faye, Jaq, and John.

He was a member of the leftist student group Samahang Demokratiko ng Kabataan until he attended the Philippine Military Academy, graduating in 1979. He then opted to become an officer in the Philippine Marine Corps.

== Military career ==
Querubin is a highly decorated military officer renowned for his courageous career and combat exploits. He has 67 battle and artillery scars throughout his service. Querubin holds the distinction of being one of the most highly decorated officers in Philippine military history, having received a total of 49 medals. Notably, he is a recipient of the prestigious Medal of Valor, the highest honor bestowed upon those who have displayed extraordinary heroism and sacrifice in combat situations.

He has actively participated in various military operations against the Communist insurgency in the Philippines and the Moro conflict. He is credited with neutralizing several rebel leaders from both the Communist Party of the Philippines - New People's Army and the Moro National Liberation Front (MNLF). This includes the elimination of a CPP-NPA provincial chairman in 1981, four MNLF commanders in 1983, an NPA commander known as "Ka Ninong" in 1988, and an MNLF commander named Racquel Carreon in the same year. Additionally, Querubin is said to have played a role in the rescue operation of Hans Kunzli, a Swiss national who was kidnapped by a group led by a former member of the Moro National Liberation Front.

=== Participation in the 1987 coup attempt ===
On August 28, 1987, Reform the Armed Forces Movement rebels led by Gregorio Honasan attempted to oust President Corazon Aquino. They attacked Malacañang Palace, Camp Aguinaldo and Villamor Air Base. Querubin, along with Red Kapunan and Juancho Sabban, attempted to bring Philippine Military Academy cadets from Baguio to Manila to provide support for Honasan.

=== Participation in the 1989 coup attempt ===
In 1989, then-Captain Querubin was a co-founder of the Young Officers' Union (YOU). The YOU, along with another group known as the "Soldiers of the Filipino People" (SFP) and the Reform the Armed Forces Movement (RAM) participated in the attempted ouster against Corazon Aquino's government. He almost died in clashes with troops loyal to the government. Some reports indicate that he suffered from a gunshot wound; Querubin himself stated that he was wounded by a rocket blast during clashes in Camp Aguinaldo. The military exercise eventually failed and Querubin and his comrades were detained. They were granted amnesty during the administration of Fidel Ramos, who succeeded Corazon Aquino as president.

=== Kidnapping by Abu Sayyaf Group and pursuit ===
On June 8, 1994, the Abu Sayyaf militant group, a breakaway faction from the MNLF, carried out a kidnapping operation. Their target was a group of 75 civilians, including men, women, children, and a parish priest named Fr. Cirilo Nacorda. The Abu Sayyaf, led by the notorious commander Barahama Sali, who was known for his expertise with weapons and extreme brutality, separated the captives based on their religious beliefs. They released all the Muslim hostages but killed 16 Christians and took the remaining individuals, mostly teachers and Fr. Nacorda, as hostages. After the kidnapping in Lantawan, the Abu Sayyaf group, pursued by Philippine marines from the 2nd Battalion, managed to escape to Sumisip. Additional military forces were dispatched to break up the pursuit. On June 12, Philippine Independence Day, the remaining hostages, except for Fr. Nacorda, were released. That evening, a journalist named Cesar Soriano, working for ABS-CBN and CNN, approached Querubin and his men, seeking to be taken to Zamboanga City. Querubin, believing Soriano had vital information about Sali, threatened to throw his camera into the sea if he did not divulge the information. According to Soriano, he had been blindfolded when taken to Sali's location and witnessed the release of the captives, but he managed to peek through the blindfold and note landmarks that proved useful to Querubin.

Two days later, Querubin and his men intercepted a radio call for Sali, using his codename "Sniper," revealing that Sali's movements had been compromised, forcing them to deviate from their plan. At daybreak, a premature engagement broke out between the forward marine forces and MNLF separatists. After numerous encounters and similar engagements, Barahama Sali's forces were neutralized, eventually leading to the release of Fr. Nacorda in Basilan. Querubin, who had previously been granted amnesty, re-entered military service and was credited with the neutralization of Barahama Sali in 1994, which directly led to the eventual release from captivity of the Catholic priest Fr. Cirilo Nacorda, who had been kidnapped by the Abu Sayyaf group in Basilan.

=== 2000 Philippines-MILF War ("Battle of Kauswagan") ===
In 2000, Lt. Col. Querubin was conferred the Armed Forces of the Philippines' highest honor, the Medal of Valor for leading a military operation against 300 Moro Islamic Liberation Front (MILF) fighters in Lanao del Norte. Medal of Valor citation:

LIEUTENANT COLONEL ARIEL O. QUERUBIN 0-7901 Philippine Navy (Marines)(GSC)

For acts of conspicuous courage, gallantry and intrepidity above and beyond the call of duty as Commanding Officer, Marine Battalion Landing Team-1, Philippine Marine Corps., Philippine Navy during a 24-hour firefight against an estimated 300 fully armed men belonging to the separatists Moro Islamic Liberation Front at Brgy. Inudaran, Kauswagan, Lanao del Norte from 18 to 19 March 2000. Tasked to capture the formidable MILF Camp John Mack (ABDULLATEF), headquarters of the 303rd Brigade, 3rd Field Division of the MILF commanded by the notorious Abdul Rahman G. Macapaar, alias Commander Bravo, LIEUTENANT COLONEL QUERUBIN spearheaded the 1st MBLT composed of 117 officers and men in this hazardous mission against the enemy, superior in numbers and mastery of the terrain, and believed responsible for the spate of bombings in Central Mindanao and the siege of and hostage-taking at Kauswagan, Lanao del Norte. On or about 1815H March 2000, while enroute to their objective, he and his men were subjected to heavy volume of fire by rebels from their well-entrenched dug outs, bunkers and trenches. Unable to maneuver due to darkness and intense devastating fires from both heavy and light machineguns, B-40 rockets, mortar and snipers, he nevertheless ordered his men to hold the line and directed the Special Operations Squad to close in on the enemy camp and pinpoint its location to the Marines battalion artillery supporting fires, and the V-300 and V-150 armored vehicles to dislodge the enemy from their heavily fortified bunkers. Unmindful of his own safety, LIEUTENANT COLONEL QUERUBIN continuously moved from one forward position to another, thus drawing enemy fires to his own location, purposely to pinpoint enemy targets for their artillery support fires. The battle which had raged continuously until the following day, did not deter him from rallying his men in repulsing wave after wave of enemy reinforcement and continued assaults in their attempt to encircle his unit. Despite dwindling ammunition and increasing casualties on their side, subject officer never lost his aggressive spirit as he continued to move around while urging and inspiring his men, included the wounded, to continue. Under his inspiring leadership, his men fought ferociously forcing the enemy’s last line of defense to collapse and sending them scampering to different directions along with their dead and wounded and leaving behind their vaunted rocket launchers and high-powered firearms as well as documents of high intelligence value. The capture of Camp John Mack resulted in the neutralization of the MILF’s most strategic staging area for operations and, more importantly, liberated the residents along the coastal municipalities of Lanao del Norte from the oppressive MILF revolutionary collection estimated at P38M annually. By this gallant deed, LIEUTENANT COLONEL QUERUBIN distinguished himself in combat in the finest tradition of Filipino Soldiery.

=== 2002 operation against ASG's Abu Sabaya ===
ASG leader Abu Sabaya held captives — missionaries Martin and Gracia Burnham along with 18 other people — whom were kidnapped in May 2001. On June 21, 2002, a team led by Querubin, aided by US forces and equipment, tracked Sabaya who was killed in a firefight at sea.

After a brief respite in East Timor, Querubin found himself once again confronted by the presence of Abu Sabaya upon his return to Zamboanga City for the Christmas holidays. This time, Sabaya was reintroduced to Querubin by a friend of his who happened to be a former classmate of Querubin's wife.

During a breakfast meeting, Querubin's wife's cousin, Tonggo Climaco, arrived accompanied by Alvin Siglos. Siglos sought Querubin's advice, informing him that he had switched sides and was now working with Querubin's old friend and comrade-in-arms, Colonel Juancho Sabban, in the rescue effort for the Burnham couple and nurse Deborah Yap.

Siglos expressed more concern over the military agents pursuing him than over Sabaya, whom he had forsaken. However, Querubin understood that Siglos' alliance with Sabban was not entirely comforting, as jealousy over credit, especially in the fight against the Abu Sayyaf, ran deep within the military. Though unsure how he could assist, Querubin and his wife's cousin offered to drive Siglos home, hoping to provide him some reassurance.

During the drive, Querubin received a call from Lt. Gen. Roy Cimatu, the South Command Military Chief, summoning him to the Edwin Andrews Air Base where Cimatu was preparing to fly to Basilan for the Burnham operation.

In their brief meeting, two key issues were discussed. First, Cimatu wanted a satellite phone that had been fitted with a tracking device and smuggled into Sabaya's possession to be returned, as he was concerned it could be used for propaganda purposes, presenting more danger than opportunity. The second point concerned Querubin's sudden transfer from the First Marine Brigade in Lanao del Sur to the Second Marine Brigade in Basilan, the center of the operation. When Querubin arrived in Basilan, he became aware of the significant American involvement in the operation.

The Americans had managed to place the satellite phone in Sabaya's hands, likely hoping he would use it to communicate and make a deal. At the time, American troops were conducting a joint civil-military exercise called Balikatan with their Filipino counterparts in Basilan and Zamboanga City, the heart of Abu Sayyaf territory. They were utilizing state-of-the-art equipment, including the satellite phone given to Sabaya.

Night-vision technology and specialized sensors empowered surveillance aircraft to operate in darkness, aiding in troop deployment and extraction. This capability forced Sabaya to abandon Basilan, his usual stronghold, due to heightened vulnerability. Despite being on the move, Sabaya's location remained traceable through his modified phone and aerial reconnaissance, revealing his presence on Dassalan, an island near Basilan.

In an effort to intercept Sabaya before he reached Zamboanga del Norte, a strategic amphibious assault was led on Dassalan. However, the operation faced resistance from enemy boats that engaged in a confrontation, ultimately succumbing to superior firepower. Upon reaching the shore, only abandoned high-caliber firearms with erased serial numbers were discovered, indicating Sabaya's escape with his hostages.

Subsequently, Sabaya's movements were monitored by Colonel Sabban's surveillance network, prompting a swift seaborne attack. A task force comprising Marine Force Recon elements and Navy SEALs, initially 100 strong, expanded significantly to 2,000 with the inclusion of the U.S. trained Light Reaction Company. Despite early skirmishes with the Scout Rangers upon landing, the main assault saw minimal engagement, with both sides avoiding casualties. Notably, a nearly empty container of peanut butter intended for the Burnhams was among the remnants left behind.

In a strategic turn of events, an Abu Sayyaf gang managed to evade detection for days, only to be pinpointed by a spy plane near a marine unit stationed from the Force Recon Battalion. First Lieutenant Rommel Bognalbal swiftly reported the sighting of the enemy group, which had seized a heavy-equipment operator and another hostage before fleeing the scene.

Bognalbal and his team, utilizing a borrowed bloodhound, promptly pursued the enemy, closing in on their trail within fifty days. However, an unexpected shift in command redirected the operation to Captain Olliver Almonares' Scout Rangers, disrupting the momentum of the pursuit. This deviation from the established strategy proved detrimental, allowing Sabaya a narrow escape route through a treacherous ravine leading to a logging trail.

Despite the Scout Rangers taking over, their delayed response and conspicuous movements failed to prevent Sabaya's disappearance before dawn, leaving behind taunting traces of his presence. Prompted by the discovery of the escape at sunrise, Captain Almonares and his unit swiftly mobilized, eventually intercepting Sabaya and his group as they paused for prayers at day's end.

Gracia Burnham, after enduring 13 months of captivity, was finally liberated as the enemy, caught off guard and scattered, chose to abandon its hostages. Gracia's release marked a poignant moment as she prepared to return to Illinois to lay her husband, Martin, to rest following his tragic demise in the crossfire during their captivity.

In a subsequent development, one of Sabaya's associates was apprehended a few days later after straying wounded into the territory held by the 5th Marine Battalion under the command of LtCol. Armand Banez, stationed in a strategic blocking position. Meanwhile, Sabaya himself had once again managed to evade capture, disappearing from the scene.

The narrative took a dramatic turn as, unbeknownst to the observers but monitored by a spy plane, operatives disembarked upon reaching the shore. Subsequently, a group of nine individuals, including Sabaya, boarded a boat and set off to sea. As they reappeared on radar about a kilometer offshore, tensions rose as the American boat commander prepared his men for action, prompting a cautionary intervention to avoid breaching restricted territory under the Balikatan exercise terms.

Amidst the escalating situation, a swift resolution unfolded as the marines and SWAGS engaged in a high-speed pursuit, culminating in a confrontation that led to the overturning of the Abu Sayyaf boat. The aftermath revealed casualties among the terrorists, with some rescued from the water while others succumbed to fatal hits. The fate of Sabaya remained uncertain, with reports suggesting his demise, supported by the belief that his conspicuous absence indicated a presumed end to his reign of terror.

=== 2006 Fort Bonifacio standoff ===
On 24 February 2006, President Gloria Macapagal Arroyo issued a proclamation declaring a state of emergency in the Philippines after her government foiled a supposed coup plot called Oplan HACKLE. Fourteen junior military officers had been arrested two days before. In the wake of the proclamation, on 26 February 2006, Major General Renato Miranda, the Philippine Marine Corps Commandant, was relieved from his post. Colonel Querubin protested his removal and some Marines started a vigil at Fort Bonifacio. Querubin stated that they would wait there for the people to protect them. Meanwhile, other government security forces loyal to Arroyo locked down Fort Bonifacio, sealing in the protesting Marines. The standoff was resolved that evening. Querubin was detained at Camp Aguinaldo and recommended to undergo pretrial investigation and facing a mutiny charge.

In 2010, President Benigno Aquino III issued Proclamation No. 50, granting amnesty to military personnel linked to the 2003 Oakwood mutiny, the 2006 Fort Bonifacio standoff and the 2007 Manila Peninsula siege.

== Retirement ==
Querubin was deemed resigned on 30 November 2009 but formally retired on 23 December 2021 when the Philippine Marine Corps tendered his long-awaited retirement and testimonial ceremony.

== Political career ==
=== 2010 senatorial campaign ===
Querubin worked as an internal security consultant for San Miguel Corporation after being granted amnesty. He resigned his commission from the Armed Forces of the Philippines when he ran for a Senate seat as a member of the Nacionalista Party during the 2010 elections. His candidacy was not successful, only garnering 6.5 million votes and landing him 19th place in the senatorial race. He supported Grace Poe's candidacy during the 2016 presidential election.

=== 2025 senatorial campaign ===
Querubin once again ran for a Senate seat as a Nacionalista in the 2025 Philippine Senate election, endorsed by 1Sambayan, Senator JV Ejercito, Senator Grace Poe and former President Rodrigo Duterte. Querubin, however, did not succeed in his second attempt, landing in 36th place in the senatorial race.

== Electoral history ==
Electoral history of Ariel Querubin
Year	Office	Party	Votes received				Result
Year	Office	Party	Total	%	P.	Swing	Result
2010	Senator of the Philippines	Nacionalista	6,547,925	17.16%	18th	—N/a	Lost
2025	Senator of the Philippines	Nacionalista	3,950,051	6.89%	36th	-10.27	Lost

== Personal life ==
=== Near-death experience ===
In 1989, Querubin was struck by a Sikorsky helicopter gunship and was mistakenly declared dead at the Quirino Labor Hospital morgue until a doctor noticed his Philippine Military Academy ring and a twitch in his finger. After suffering multiple cardiac arrests, he was transferred to the AFP Medical Center, where doctors removed part of his liver, six feet of his small intestine, and repaired his ruptured pancreas.

=== Relationships ===
During his recovery at V. Luna's Surgical ICU, Querubin met Dr. Loreta Cercenia, who was part of the surgical team that operated on him. When he regained consciousness, he believed he was in heaven, captivated by Dr. Cercenia's angelic appearance. She later became his first wife and gave birth to their two children, Alfred Benjamin and Francesca Eufrosina. Dr. Cercenia died in 1994 at the age of 31. Querubin eventually remarried, and with his second wife, Pong Azcarraga Querubin, they had three more children: Jose Ariel, Ariel, and John Ariel. He also became a stepfather to Pong's children from her previous marriage, Atty. Jose Martin Loon and Marine captain John Michael Loon.

== See also ==
- Custodio Parcon
