= Yatco =

Yatco may refer to name originating from the Philippines:

- Oscar Yatco (1930–2014), Filipino violinist, conductor laureate, and concertmaster
- Mona Lisa (actress) (born Gloria Lerma Yatco, 1922), FAMAS award-winning Filipino film actress
- Cesar Alzona (born Caezar Yatco Alzona; 1926–1997), author of the original first Philippine Marines Hymn
