= Alzona =

Alzona may refer to:

- Encarnacion Alzona (March 23, 1895 – March 13, 2001) was a pioneering Filipino historian, educator and suffragist
- Cesar Alzona (Sept 15, 1926-June 27, 1997) Laguna, Philippines, is the author of the original first Philippine Marines Hymn
