= Philippine Marine Corps Drum and Bugle Team =

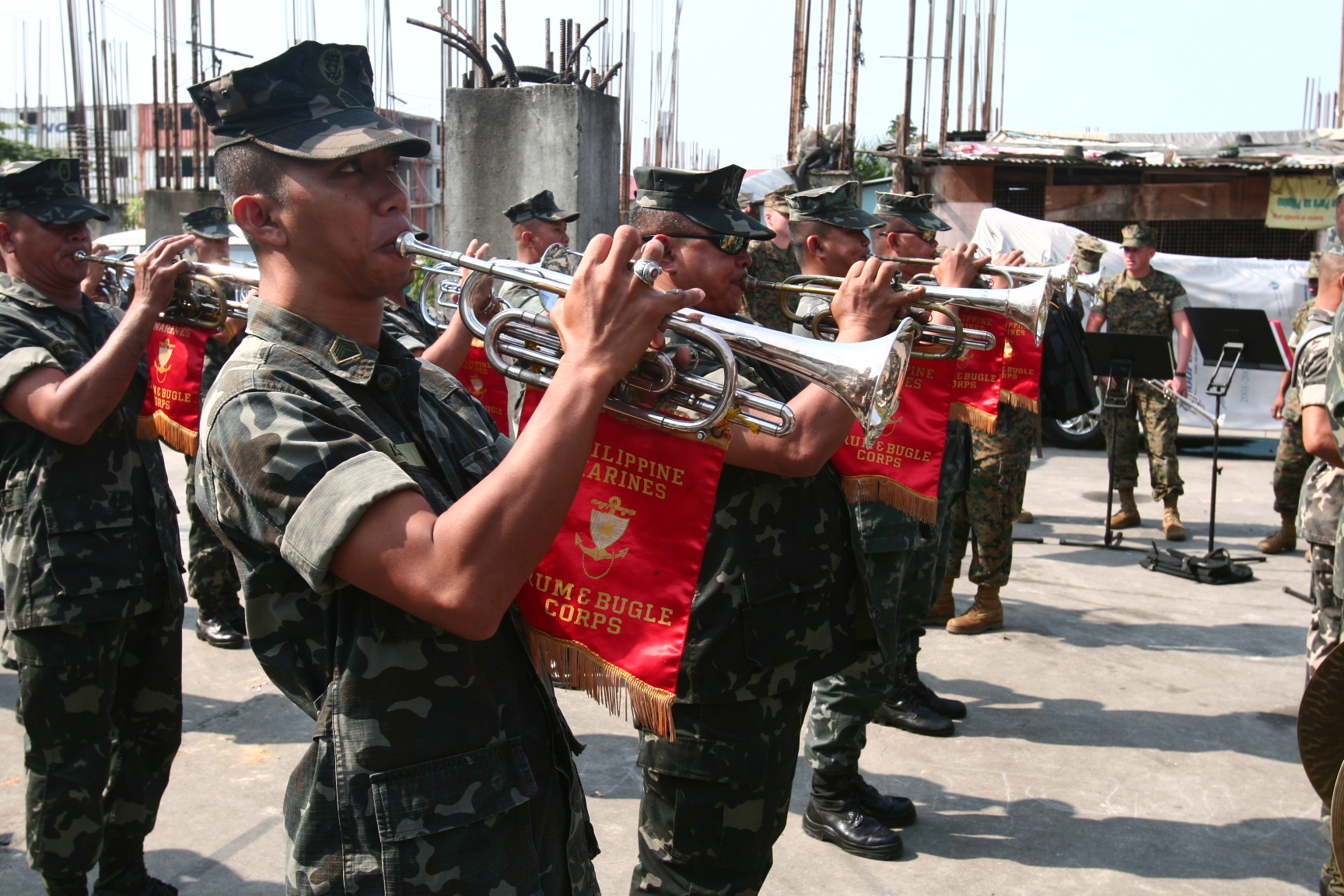
- Active: 1963 to Present
- Country: Philippines
- Branch: Philippine Marine Corps
- Type: Military band
- Size: 50
- Garrison/HQ: Rudiardo Brown Marine Barracks, Taguig, Metro Manila
- Nickname(s): AFP's Ambassadors of Goodwill

Commanders
- Notable commanders: Chief petty officer Avelino Mejico

The Philippine Marine Corps Drum and Bugle Team (MDBT) is the drum and bugle corps as well as the prime musical unit of the Philippine Marine Corps. The MDBT is now the only full-time active duty drum corps in the Armed Forces of the Philippines (AFP). This unit emulates the United States Marine Drum and Bugle Corps of the United States Marine Corps. The MDBT is led by an NCO Drum Major during parades.

== Background ==
In the late 1950s, mounting demands surfaced for the representation of the PMC in various significant national events on a musical level. The then Commandant of the Philippine Marines, Commander Gregorio Lim, who was inspired and impressed with the performance and visit of the United States Marine Drum and Bugle Corps to Manila, initiated the organization of the MDBT. With that, in early 1963, a group of weapons personnel with musical experience were assembled to establish the core of the MDBT. It differed from the D&B Corps at the time just from the adoption of the word "Team" rather than "Corps" in its name due to the band having 17 personnel and the marines only being battalion sized.

The task of putting the team on the world stage was in the hands of Chief Petty Officer Avelino Mejico, who served as the first director of the MDBT. Since it was introduced, the team has been providing musical support to the Marines at military ceremonies and other social functions. Their unique demonstration and style gave them the opportunity to perform in different parts of the archipelago as well as abroad as part of various Naval Goodwill Missions. Being the only Drum and Bugle Team in the entire AFP, the MDBT commonly is used as a marching band that represents the entire AFP on some occasions. The MDBT regularly performs with ceremonial units in the military, such as the PMC's Silent Drill Team and the Marine Security Escort Group. Their general routine drill involves a series of martial musical displays that resemble high school and college marching bands in the United States. Their drill has taken them to various nations in the region and around the world, earning it the title of "AFP's Ambassadors of Goodwill".

== Uniforms and instruments ==
The field musicians of the PMC DBT wear either combat dress or the service blue uniform with white gauntlets that cover the wrists. The MDBT only employs brass instruments in its ranks, with the most common instrument being the Soprano Bugle in G. These bugles have the emblem of the MDBT attached to it, which has the emblem of the PMC in the center of a red background and the MDBT's full name on top of the emblem. The Corps also employs marching percussion (Snare and Bass drums), as well as Marching Bells.

== See also ==
- United States Marine Drum and Bugle Corps
- Philippine Constabulary Band
