= Philippine Marine Corps =

Naval Infantry unit of the Philippine Navy

- Hukbong Kawal Pandagat ng Pilipinas
- Seal of the Philippine Marine Corps
- Founded: November 7, 1950; 76 years ago
- Country: Philippines
- Branch: Philippine Navy
- Type: Naval infantry corps
- Role: Amphibious and expeditionary warfare
- Size: 10,300
- Part of: Armed Forces of the Philippines
- Garrison/HQ: Fort Bonifacio, Taguig City
- Mottos: Karangalan, Katungkulan, Kabayanihan ("Honor, Duty, Valor")
- Colors: Scarlet, Gold and Blue
- March: The Philippine Marine Corps Hymn
- Anniversaries: 7 November
- Engagements: Communist Insurgencies; Moro Conflict; New People's Army rebellion; Spratly Islands Dispute; Operation Enduring Freedom - Philippines; UN Peacekeeping Operations; Manila Peninsula siege; 2013 Zamboanga crisis; 2017 Marawi siege
- Website: www.marinecorps.mil.ph

Commanders
- Commander-in-Chief: President Bongbong Marcos
- Secretary of National Defense: Gilberto C. Teodoro
- Chief of Staff of the Armed Forces of the Philippines: Gen Antonio G. Nafarrette, PA
- Flag Officer-in-Command of the Philippine Navy: VAdm Alan M. Javier, PN
- Commandant: MGen Bob R. Apostol, PN(M)
- Deputy Commandant: BGen Bayani V. Curaming, PN(M)
- Command Sergeant Major: SMS Rommel V. Carbon, PN(M)

The Philippine Marine Corps (PMC) (Filipino: Hukbong Kawal Pandagat ng Pilipinas) is the naval infantry force under the command of the Philippine Navy. The PMC conducts amphibious, expeditionary, and special operations missions.

== History ==
"The task of training these young men into Marines is vested upon us. Today, as we start training them, we will be striking the first hammer blow in forging the "cutting edge" of the Armed Forces."

— LTSG Manuel Gomez's mission on the formation of the Philippine Marines in 1950

On orders from President Elpidio Quirino and Secretary of National Defense (later President) Ramon Magsaysay, the unit that was to be known as the Philippine Marine Corps was organized on November 7, 1950, initially known as "A" Company, Philippine Fleet, then headquartered in Naval Base Cavite, Cavite City. It was organized under the structure patterned after a Rifle Company of its American counterpart, the United States Marine Corps (USMC).

Personnel from the United States Army, and the USMC helped train the first "Philippine Marines" in combat and amphibious duties in Fort Bonifacio in Makati and in various other locations. Lieutenant Senior Grade Manuel Gomez (Philippine Military Academy Class of 1941) was its first Commandant, with then-Lieutenant Junior Grade Gregorio Lim assisting him, with six other officers (4 seconded from the Navy and two from the Philippine Army) joining them, several of these officers being veterans of the Second World War.

230 enlisted men will also form the unit, volunteers from the Army and the Navy, veteran Philippine Scouts, and high school graduates. These inaugural Philippine Marines volunteered to serve one or more tours of duty and were later given the choice to continue serving in the Navy, or now dedicate their career into the nascent fighting unit.

Under LTSG Gomez, the Marines underwent a 24-week training program following the ones conducted by the USMC. The final eight weeks of this program was spent in a field with the trainees virtually living in an area swarmed with dissident units, such as Communist rebels from the Hukbalahap.

Their hard work and training would pay off as "A" Company conducted its first amphibious landing on April 19, 1951, in Umiray, Quezon, and took part in battle for the first time on June 4 of the same year in Nueva Ecija against the Huks. These and other notable battles in various parts of the country, as well as overseas deployments to Korea, led to the Navy's decision to activate "B" Company, and the Headquarters and Service Company, now with LCDR Lim in charge. These three companies will now compose the 1st Marine Battalion, activated on November 7, 1955. Further marine companies and a weapons company would later be formed to augment the expansion of the force in the 1960s, and the abilities even expanded to VIP protection, and would also see the raising of its very own drum and bugle corps. The Marines would see themselves in action in securing the Spratly Islands in 1971 and in combating Muslim separatist forces and a strong New People's Army in the following years as the force became the Philippine Marine Brigade with the formation of the 2nd and 3rd Marine Battalions, the Headquarters Service Group, the 1st Provisional Tactical Battalion which saw action in Mindanao against Islamic separatists, and the Marine Training Group, later the Philippine Marines Training Group.

To highlight these changes the force was renamed as the Philippine Marines in 1976.

As the 1980s arrived, the force expansion was accompanied by battles against both communists and armed Islamist rebels all over the country, and in 1986 even took part in the successful People Power Revolution. The latter years would also see them in action as one coup d'état after another was launched against the Corazon Aquino administration, all ending in failure. It also saw Rodolfo Biazon becoming the first and only Marine general to head the Armed Forces as Chief of Staff after a fruitful term as Superintendent of the Philippine Military Academy, also being the first and only Marine general officer to occupy the office so far in PMA history.

The 1990s would see further expansion as the force, as part of the Philippine Navy, became the Philippine Marine Corps in 1995 as the force turned 45 years old. The early 2000s would see the Marines once more facing not just communists and Islamic militants but also terrorist groups as well.

After decades of using their well-distinguished "Malunggay" leaf pattern camouflage uniforms, the PMC has used a digital disruptive camouflage pattern called the Philippine Marine Pattern (PHILMARPAT) since 2008, and has official copyright awarded to them. PHILMARPAT, which is inspired from the MARPAT used by their US counterparts, is now used in their Pixelated Battle Dress Uniforms (PBDUs).

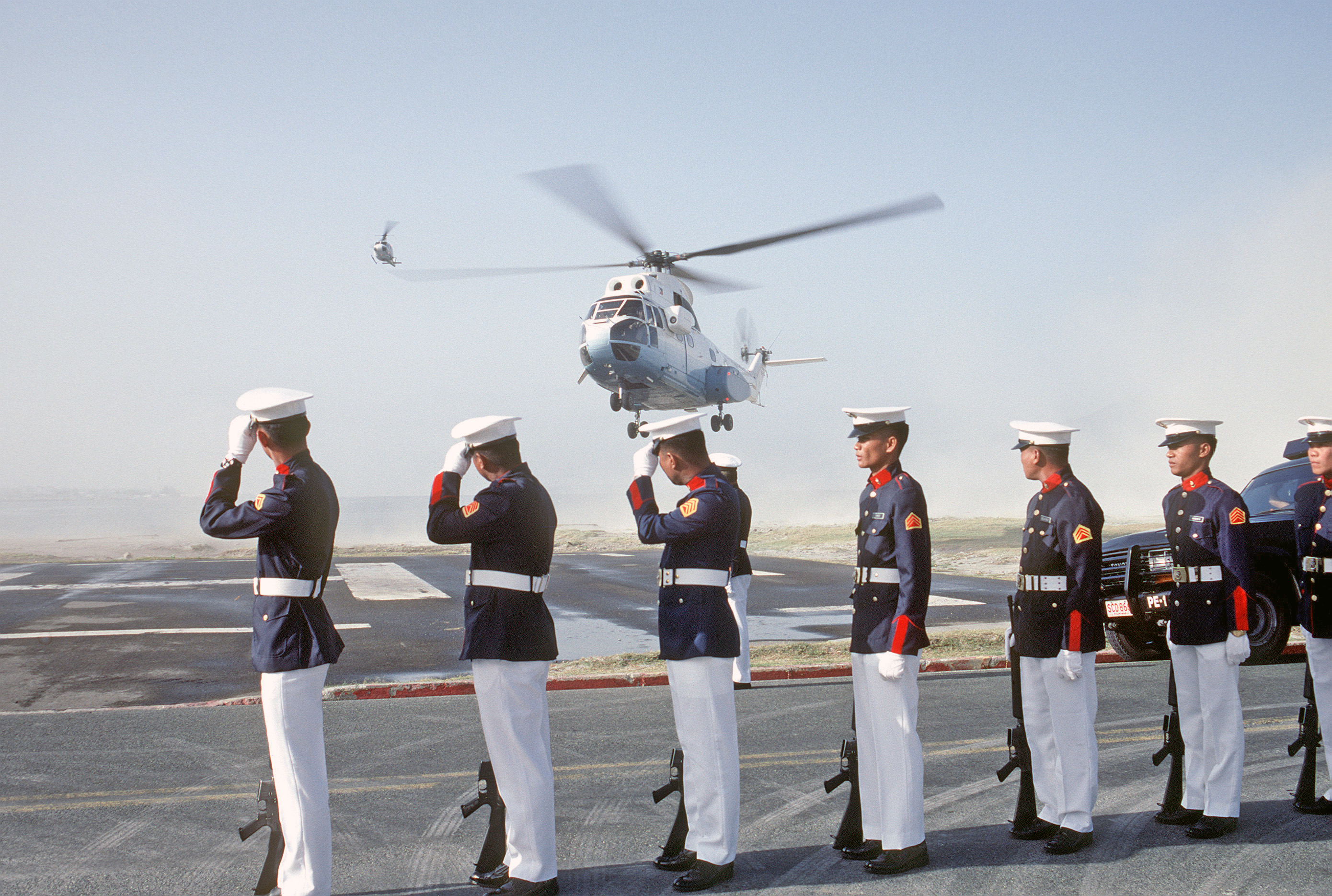
Philippine Marines, in their Dress Blue uniforms, in 2011

The Marines saw action in the Battle of Zamboanga City in 2013, providing amphibious assault and fire-support for the Infantry forces. During the Battle of Marawi in 2017, they were also seen fighting against the Islamic state militants as their Vehicles like LAV-300s and V-150s are modified with wooden planks to protect them against IEDs and RPGs.

In 2018, Filipino lawmakers were proposing a law to make the Marines as an independent branch of the Armed Forces of the Philippines, but the ties with the Navy would still remain. Defense Secretary Lorenzana has opposed this proposal.

On July 17, 2024, the PMC renamed the Marine Battalion Landing Team 4 (MBLT-4) to the Marine Security Battalion.

== Equipment ==
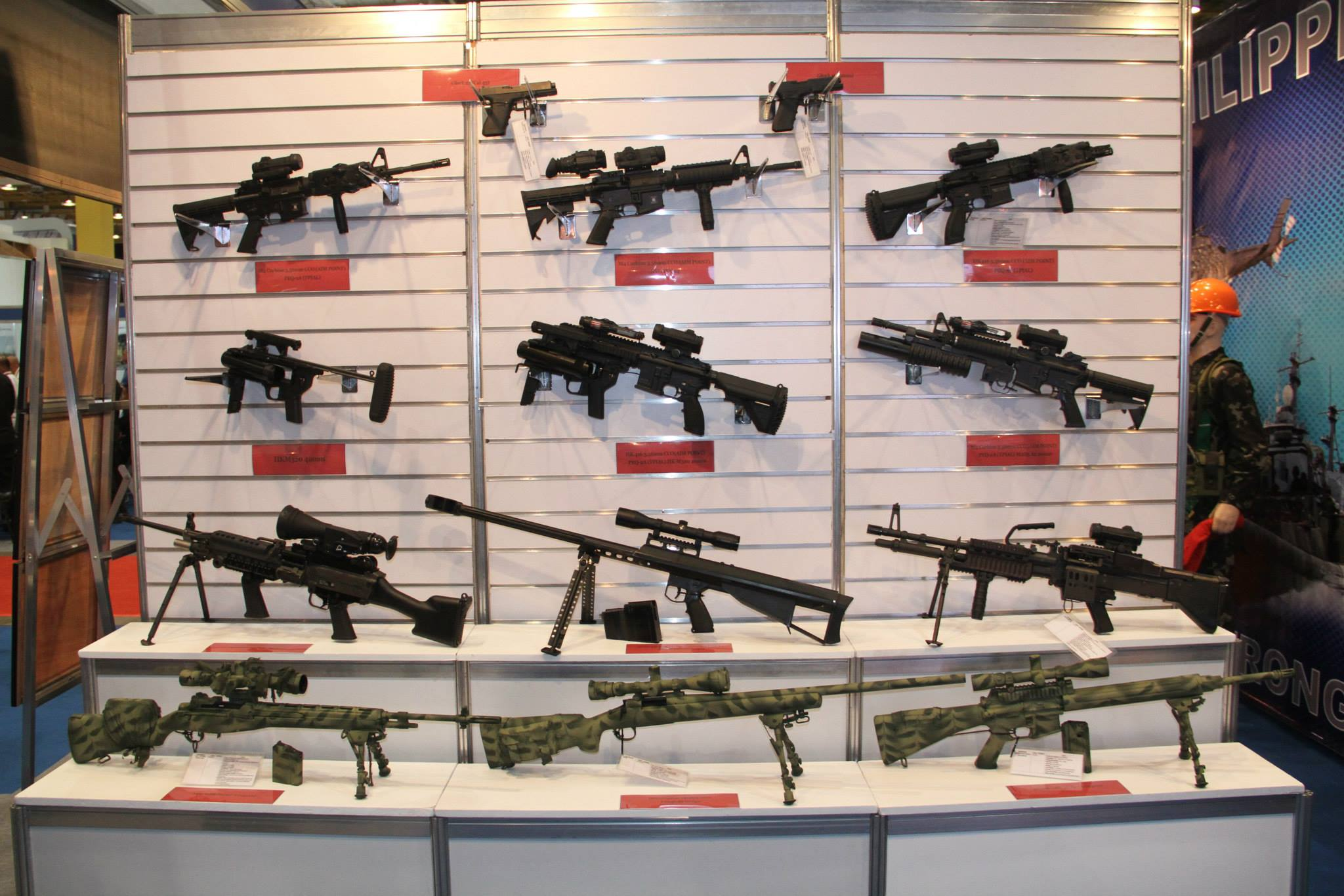
A display of Philippine Navy and Philippine Marine Corps individual weapons during ADAS 2014

The Philippine Marine Corps has made use of its existing equipment to conduct its operations while modernization projects are underway. The Republic Act No. 7898 declares the policy of the State to modernize the military to a level where it can effectively and fully perform its constitutional mandate to uphold the sovereignty and preserve the patrimony of the republic. The law, as amended, has set conditions that should be satisfied when the defense department procures major equipment and weapon systems for the Corps.

These are acquisition projects of the government that have been signed and awaiting delivery for the modernization of the Corps.

- The Philippine Navy intends to acquire 60 new Tactical Combat Vehicles for the PMC, as part of the Horizon 2 phase of the Revised AFP Modernization Program.
- 12 V-300 and 15 V-150 wheeled armored vehicles will have their turrets upgraded, and 7 V-150s will also undergo mobility upgrades as part of the Horizon 2 phase of the Revised AFP Modernization Program. Indian company Larsen & Toubro was contracted to conduct the said upgrade works.
- The Philippine Navy has ordered 702 units of ATGL-L rocket propelled grenade launchers and munitions from Bulgaria's Arsenal JSCo. for the PMC. These would replace the ageing 90mm recoilless rifles, which would in turn be mounted on light vehicles. The typical Marine squad table of organization will also be revised to include the ATGL-L RPG as part of its squad weapon. The weapons and munitions were delivered on 14 April 2021, and will be tested, while Marine units will undergo training with the new weapon.
- 7,491 new body armor and 9,528 new combat helmets were ordered from Israel's Maron Dolphin in August 2020.
- The PMC is procuring new 60mm, 81mm, and 120mm Mortars. 30 units M-98 81mm mortars expected to be delivered from Spain's EXPAL Systems SA, while the procurement process is still ongoing for the acquisition of 60mm and 120mm mortars.
- The Philippine Navy signed a contract with India to acquire three batteries of shore-based anti-ship missile system, most likely the Indian-made PJ-10 BrahMos Coastal Defense Battery System, to be operated by the PMC.
- The Philippine Navy plans to acquire two or three batteries of shore-based air defense missile systems, to be operated by the PMC to defend naval and marine installations and the BrahMos anti-ship missile batteries.

== Organization ==
The Philippine Marine Corps is organized into four maneuver brigades, a Combat Service and Support Brigade (CSSB), the Coastal Defense Regiment (CDR) and independent units such as the Force Reconnaissance Regiment (FRG), and the Marine Security and Escort Group (MSEG). The four maneuver brigades provide administrative and logistical support to the units assigned to them, while the CSSB acts as a training and administrative command for the Field Artillery (FABN) and Assault Armor (AABN) battalions.

In addition, Marine Reserve Brigades are activated and are under the control of the Naval Reserve Command, which are spread out to 6 different regions across the country.

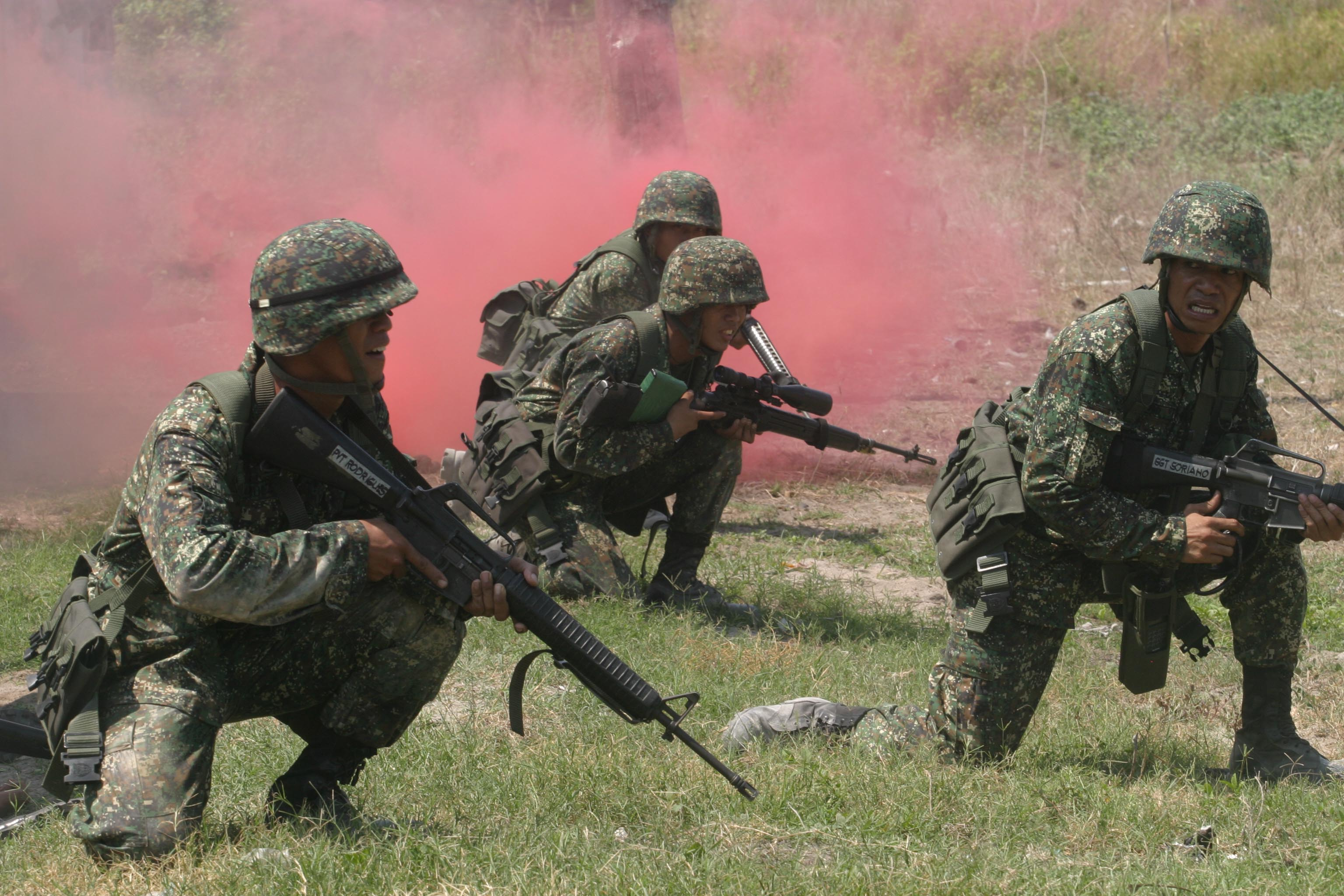
Philippine Marines 8th Marine Battalion Landing Team (MBLT-8), push forward after splashing ashore in an amphibious assault vehicle during an amphibious assault training exercise.

=== Marine Brigades ===
The Philippine Marine Corps has four Marine Brigades, each of which are primarily responsible for various operations and doctrines relating to intelligence gathering, reconnaissance, and amphibious and coastal patrol missions for both coastal and inter-island operations.

The PMC's Marine Brigades are:

- 1st Marine Brigade (1MBde) (Laging Handa; "Always Ready")
  - Activation Date: January 1975
  - Deployment Area: Western and Central Mindanao
- 2nd Marine Brigade (2MBde) (Red Shield)
  - Activation Date: April 1978
  - Deployment Area: Sulu, Basilan
- 3rd Marine Brigade (3MBde) (Agila; "Eagle")
  - Activation Date: February 1982
  - Deployment Area: Palawan, Kalayaan Island Group
- 4th Marine Brigade (4MBde) (Makusug; "Strong" in Cebuano)
  - Activation Date: June 24, 2019
  - Deployment Area: Northern Luzon

=== Marine Rifle Battalions ===
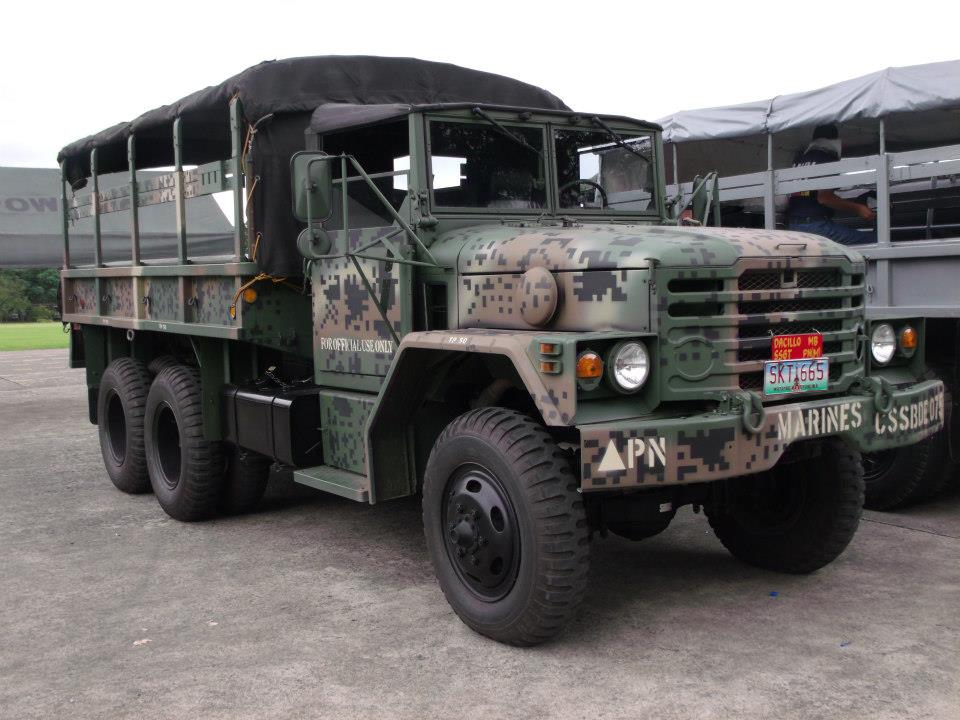
KM-25 (6X6) Truck of the Combat Service Support Brigade of the Philippine Marine Corps

The Philippine Marine Corps has twelve regular Marine Rifle Battalions. Three battalions are assigned to each of the four maneuver brigades and a single battalion is rotated back to the Marine headquarters for refit and retraining for at least six months up to one year before redeployment to operational areas throughout the Philippines. Each of the twelve battalions is organized into three rifle companies and a headquarters and service company. The battalions are augmented with elements of other units, such as artillery, armored vehicles or watercraft, for specific tasks. A combat engineer unit from the Naval Combat Engineer Brigade (NCEBde) or Seabees can be attached for construction, survivability, mobility and counter mobility support. Elements from the Force Reconnaissance Group (FRG) can also be attached for reconnaissance and unconventional warfare support to make it Special Operations Capable (SOC).

- 1st Marine Rifle Battalion (1MRBn) (Unang-Una; "First and Foremost")
- 2nd Marine Rifle Battalion (2MRBn) (Superstar)
- 3rd Marine Rifle Battalion (3MRBn) (Forger)
- 4th Marine Rifle Battalion (4MRBn) (Aim High)
- 5th Marine Rifle Battalion (5MRBn) (Only Our Best)
  - 5th Marine Company (5MC)
  - 25th Marine Company (25MC)
  - 35th Marine Company (35MC)
- 6th Marine Rifle Battalion (6MRBn) (Katapatan; Loyalty)
- 7th Marine Rifle Battalion (7MRBn) (Striking)
- 8th Marine Rifle Battalion (8MRBn) (Peacemaker)
- 9th Marine Rifle Battalion (9MRBn) (Red Lions)
- 10th Marine Rifle Battalion (10MRBn) (Kapayapaan; Peace)
- 11th Marine Rifle Battalion (11MRBn) (Matatag; "Strong")
- 12th Marine Rifle Battalion (12MRBn) (Tagapagtanggol; Defender)
  - 212th Marine Company (212MC) (Gladiator)

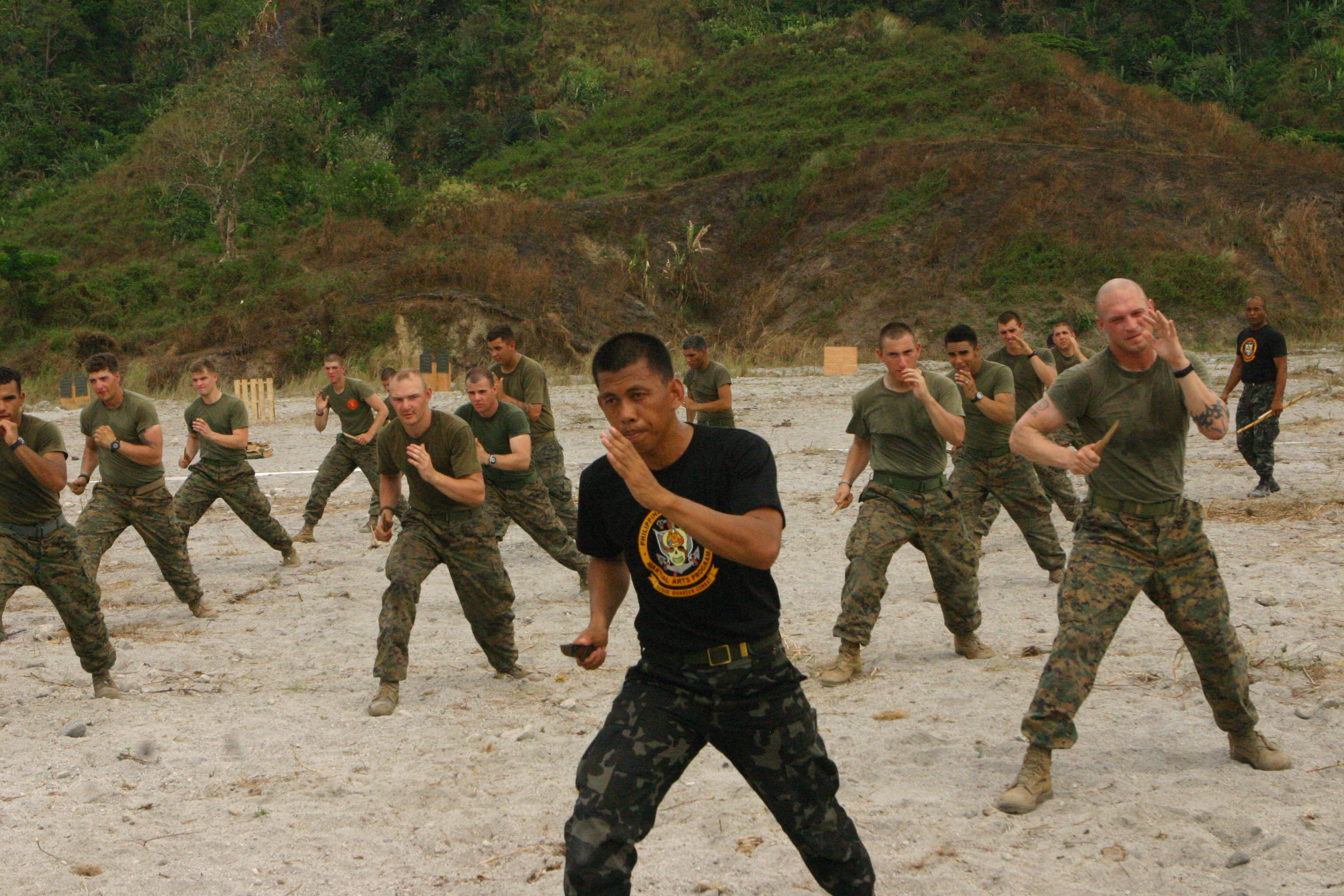
A Philippine Marine Corps instructor teaches the U.S. Marines a style of Philippine Martial Arts known as Pekiti-Tirsia Kali during a combat training exercise.

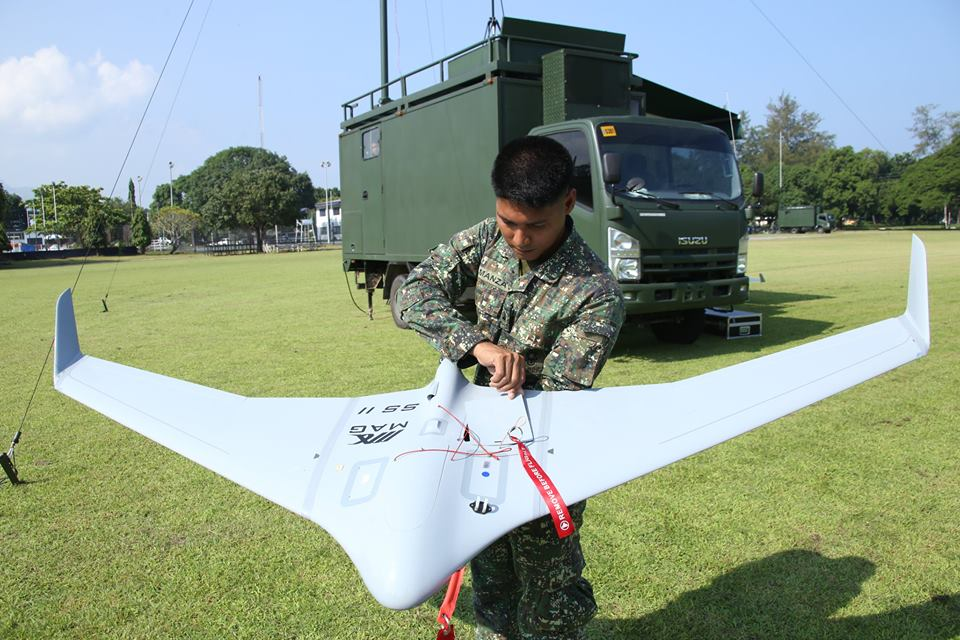
A marine UAV operator with the MAG Super Swiper II UAV, which is part of the Marine Forces Imaging & Targeting Support System (MITSS) of the Philippine Marines.

=== Force Reconnaissance Regiment ===
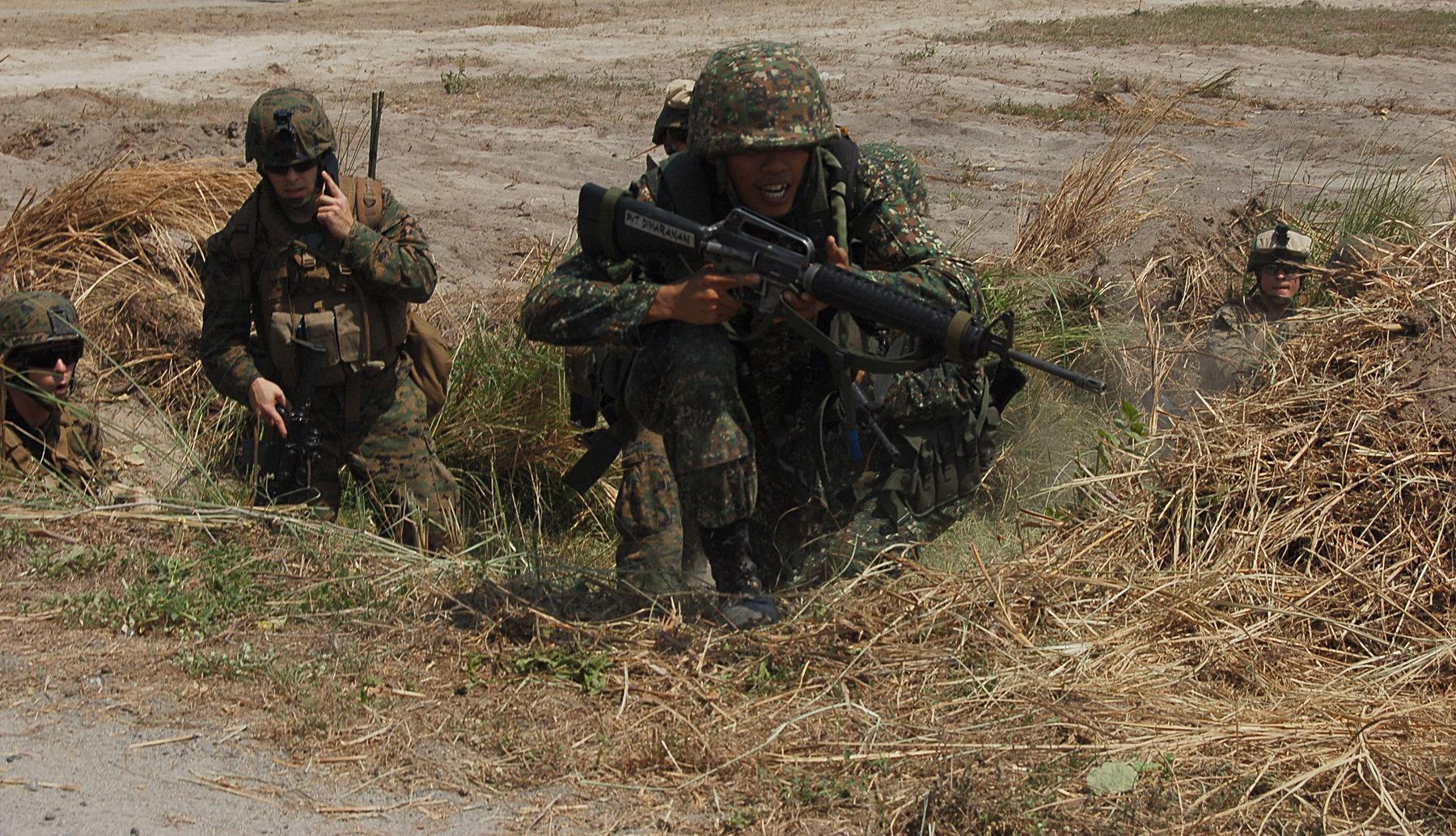
A Philippine marine rushes up a small ditch while a U.S. Marine provides communication during the Balikatan Exercise

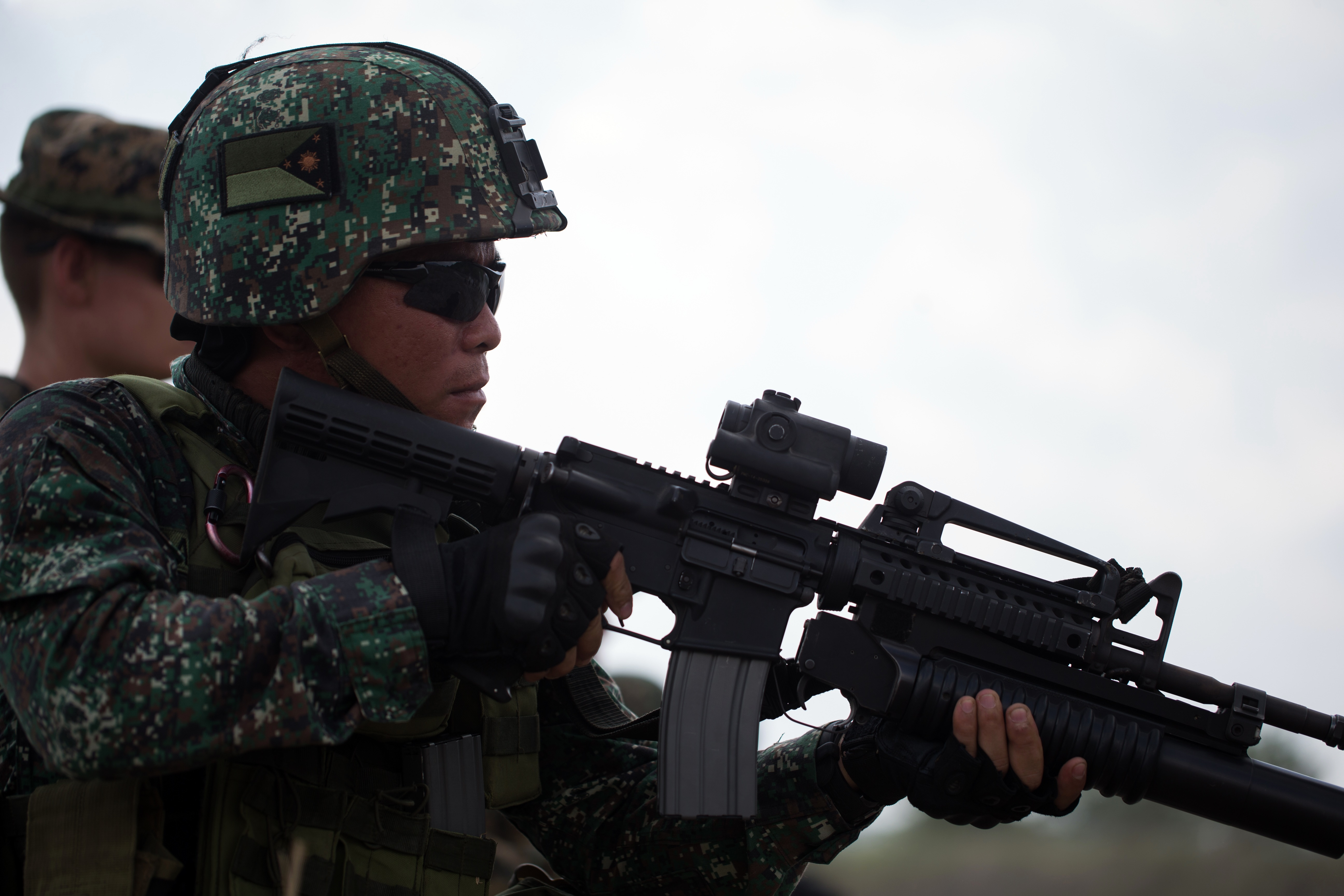
Balikatan 2011 - Marines participate in Combined-Arms Live Fire at CERAB

The Force Reconnaissance Regiment (FRR), formerly the Force Reconnaissance Group (FRG), was first activated as the 1st Reconnaissance Company on August 19, 1972.

The FRR is organized into a Headquarters, Service and Training Company and six Recon Companies. Each company is attached to a Marine Brigade as a quick maneuvering force. It specializes in sea, air, and land operations, like its counterpart in the Special Warfare Force of the Philippine Navy, ranging from surveillance, close combat, demolition, intelligence, and underwater operations in support of overall naval operations.

=== Marine Reserve Brigades ===
The PMC has in its disposal Marine Reserve Brigades (MBde(Res)) which are primarily responsible for training marine reservists in both combat operations in wartime preparedness and humanitarian assistance missions in times of natural disasters.

The PMC's Marine Reserve Brigades are:

  - 7th Marine Brigade (Reserve) - NCR (HQS Philippine Marines, Bonifacio Naval Station, Taguig City)
    - 71st Marine Battalion (Reserve) (Mandaragit; Bird of Prey)
    - 72nd Marine Battalion (Reserve) (Ready Force)
    - 73rd Marine Battalion (Reserve) (Kampilan; a type of Moro fighting sword)
  - 8th Marine Brigade (Reserve) - (Dagupan City)
    - 81st Marine Battalion (Reserve) - Iloilo City
    - 82nd Marine Battalion (Reserve)
    - 83rd Marine Battalion (Reserve)
    - 84th Marine Battalion (Reserve)
  - 9th Marine Brigade (Reserve) - (Naval Station Felix Apolinario, Davao City)
    - 91st Marine Battalion (Reserve) - Zamboanga City
      - 932nd Marine Company (Reserve) - Pagadian City
  - 13th Marine Brigade (Reserve) - (Alabel, Sarangani)

==== 7th Marine Brigade (Reserve) ====
The 7th Marine Brigade (Reserve) was activated as a provisional unit of the Philippine Navy on October 22, 1996, pursuant to Section I, General Order No. 229 ONA dated October 21, 1996 during the term of Vice Admiral Pio Carranza, AFP as FOIC, PN.

It is the Main Active Reserve Force of the Philippine Marine Corps with 3 operational Marine Battalions Composed of active men & women from different backgrounds & experiences, that are integrated to the regular & special units of the Corps. Given the same (MOS) training that enable the 7th MBde personnel to have interoperability with the rest of the Corps. Administrative control rests on the Reserve Command, Philippine Navy, while operational control is with the Philippine Marine Corps (MC9). Its motto is "Always Faithful, Always Ready" and nicknamed "Shadow Warriors".

=== Combat Support Brigade ===
The Combat Support Brigade (CSBde), also known as the Combat Service and Support Brigade (CSSBde), The Combat Support Brigade (CSB)—frequently referred to as the Combat Service and Support Brigade or CSSB—is a key administrative, training, and operational command of the PMC. It is divided into multiple battalions catering to various needs of the main combat components of the Corps.

==== Field Artillery Battalion ====
The Field Artillery Battalion (FABn) is currently organized into a Headquarters and Service Company and several howitzer batteries which are attached to the maneuver brigades to support their operations. It is equipped with the M101A1 howitzer, the OTO Melara Model 56/14 pack howitzer and the Soltam M71A1 155 howitzer. The unit also provides a limited air-defense capability through a token number of Bofors 40 mm L/60 guns, Oerlikon 20mm guns and M2 Browning guns, either in truck-mounted or towed configuration.

==== Assault Armor Battalion ====
The Assault Armor Battalion (AABn) contains a Headquarters and Service Company, an Armor Maintenance Company (Armor Mnt Co.), an Assault Amphibian Company (AAVCoy), and a Light Armor Vehicle Company (LAVCoy). It is tasked with providing the maneuver brigades with armored assets to support their operations. The unit's inventory consists of AAV-7s, LAV-150s, and LAV-300s.

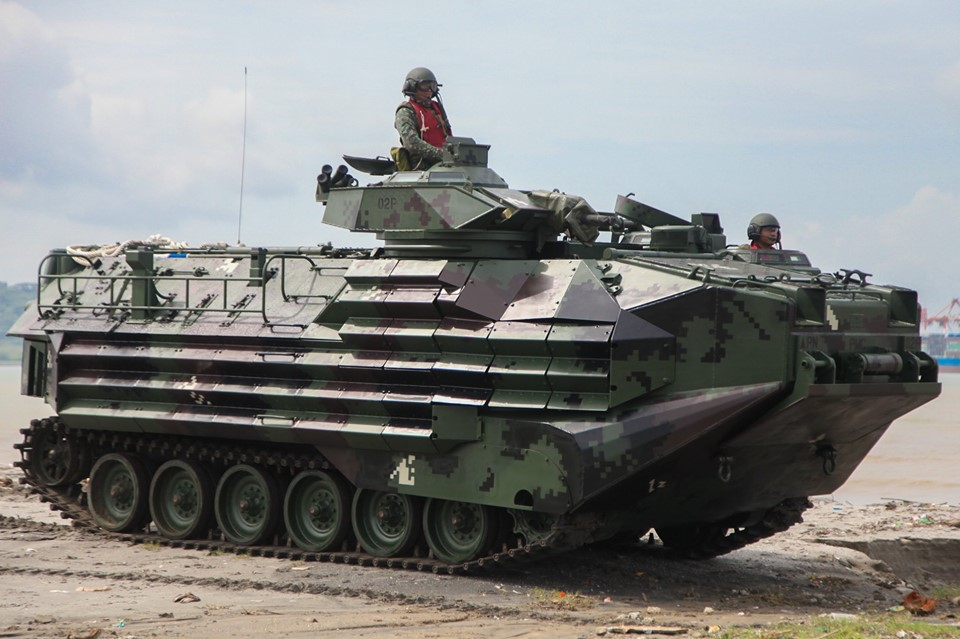
PMC's KAAV-7A1 during DAGIT-PA 03-19 exercises

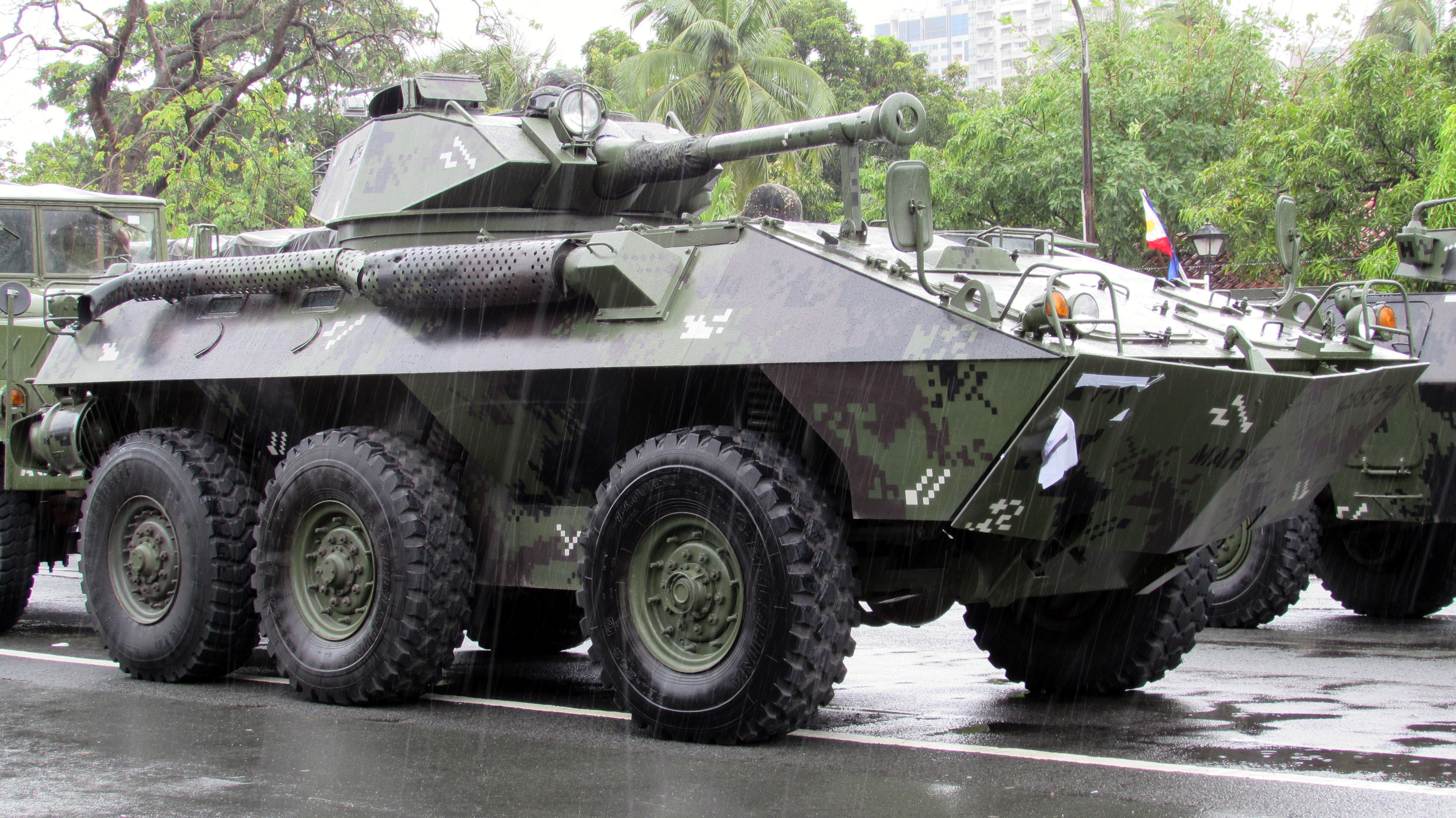
A LAV-300 vehicle of the PMC

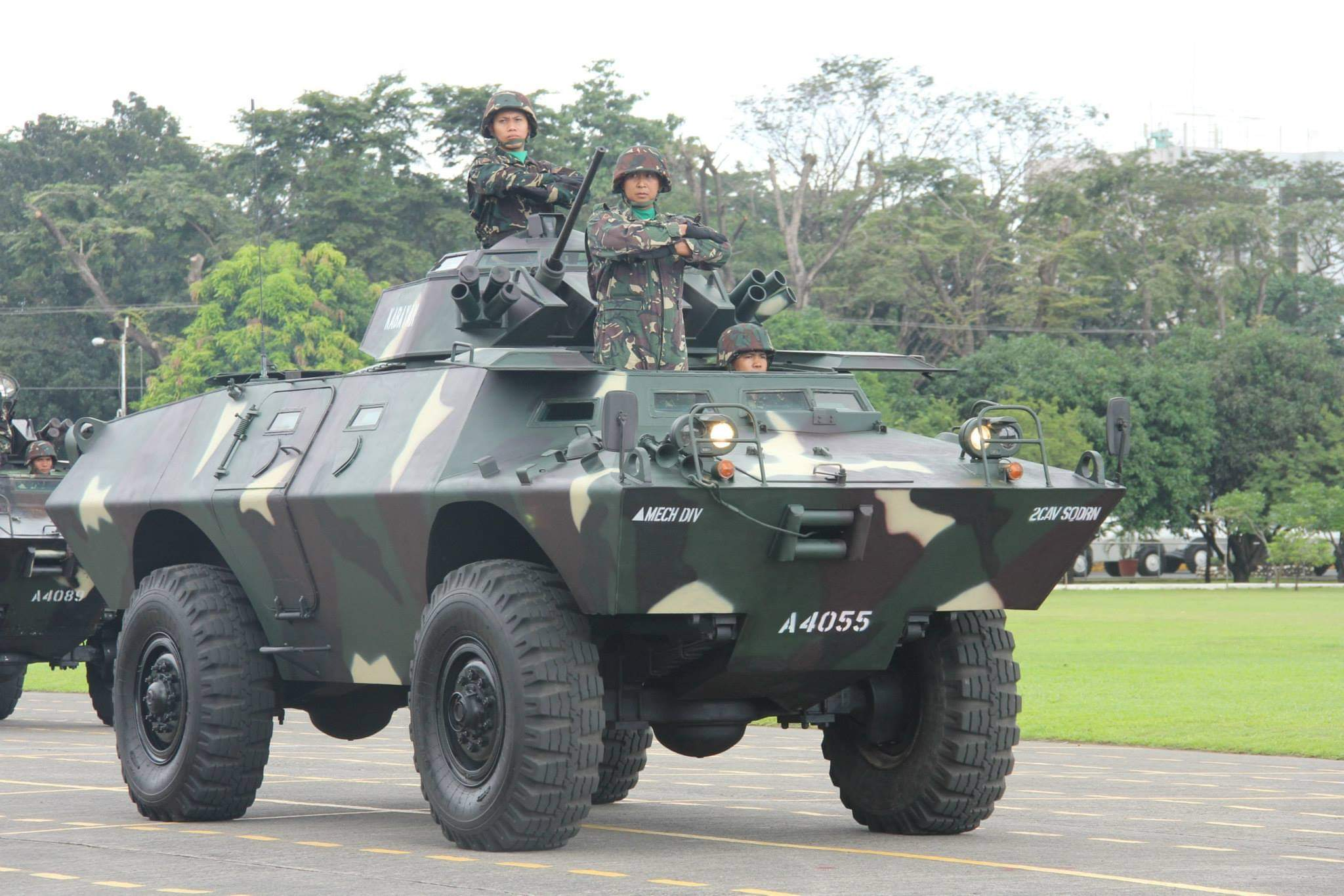
Gage Commando V-150

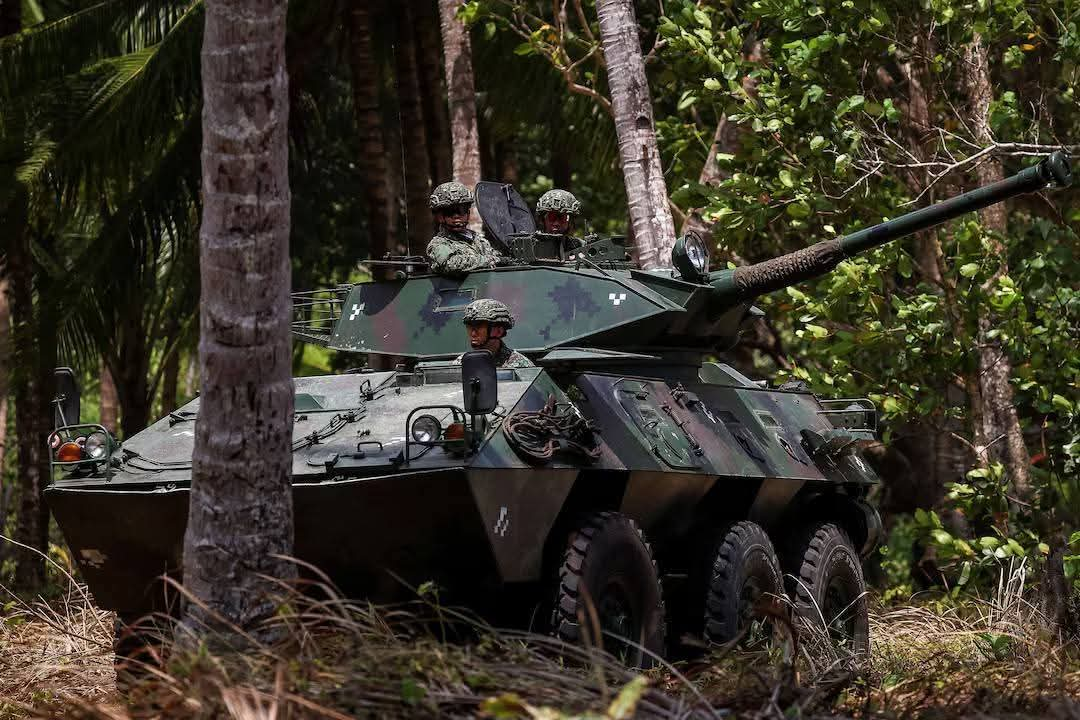
Philippine Marines LAV-300 APC use in Balikatan 2026

==== Combat Engineering Battalion ====
The Combat Engineering Battalion (CEBn) is tasked to provide combat infrastructure support for the entire Corps.

=== Marine Corps Drum and Bugle Team ===
The Marine Corps Drum and Bugle Team (MDBT) is the prime musical unit of the PMC that provides marching band and musical services in support of the ceremonial and morale activities of the Corps. This is patterned along the lines of the United States Marine Drum and Bugle Corps and is stationed at Marine Barracks R. Brown in Taguig.

=== Marine Scout Snipers ===
The Marine Scout Snipers (MSS) is the first unit in the Armed Forces of the Philippines dedicated exclusively to sniping and marksmanship. The Scout Snipers are notable for being able to effectively hit and neutralize targets at 800 metres (2,600 ft) using only 7.62mm rounds. The Marine Scout Snipers are renowned for the development and manufacture of their own weapon, the Colt M16A1 based Marine Scout Sniper Rifle.

=== Philippine Marine Corps Marine Silent Drill Platoon ===
Also headquartered in Taguig, this is the premier military drill team of the Corps and one of 4 such units in the AFP, patterned after the United States Marine Corps Silent Drill Platoon. Like its US counterpart it does a silent precision exhibition drill using the M1 Garand rifles with fixed bayonets demonstrating the Corps's abilities in all events where it is a part of. More usually seen in their full dress blues, the MSDP-PMC is a model for student run formations of high school and collegiate rifle drill teams in the country.

=== Coastal Defense Regiment ===
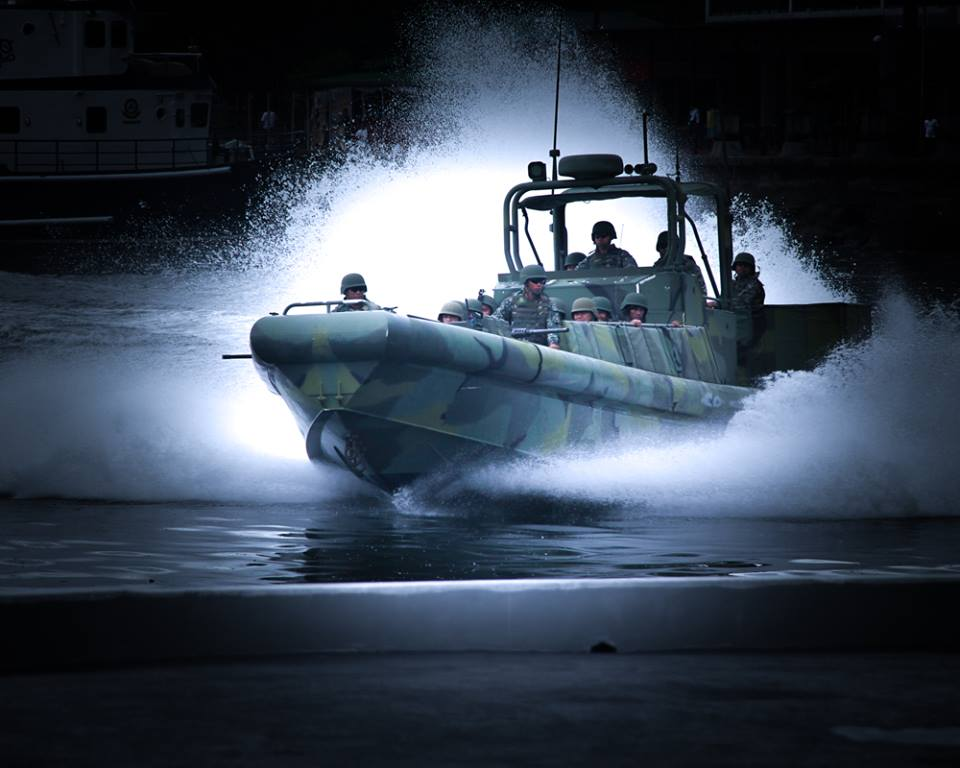
Riverine Craft of the Philippine Marines

Founded on August 7, 2020, the Coastal Defense Regiment is part of the Philippine Navy's Defense Capability Program, and also serves as a part of the Philippine Navy's Active Archipelagic Defense Strategy, which aims to improve and increase sea control capabilities based on anti-access and area denial operations, while maintaining overall territorial integrity, asserting the country's sovereignty in the Exclusive Economic Zone (EEZ) and extended continental shelf, and protect Sea Lines of Communications (SLOCs).

In early 2022 the defense department signed a contract for the unit to acquire the BrahMos Shore Based Anti-Ship Missile System from India at a cost of $375 million and were delivered in April 2024 in order to increase the unit's capabilities on defending coastlines, deterring enemy littoral ships and amphibious forces, and support overall naval operations and littoral capabilities. The unit is expected to be fully functional within 2025. The regiment comprises the Shore-Based Anti-Ship Missile (SBASM) Battalion and the Shore-Based Air Defense System (SBADS) Battalion which were both activated in June 2022.

The Coastal Defense Regiment will comprise two battalions:

- Shore Based Anti-Ship Missile Battalion (SBASMBn) — currently equipped with three BrahMos anti-ship cruise missile batteries.
- Shore Based Air-Defense Battalion (SBADBN) — currently being trained for future medium and long-range anti-air interception operations.

=== Other Combat Support Units ===
The Philippine Marine Corps also has a variety of combat support units under the Combat & Service Support Forces, which also assists the PMC to their operations.

- Combat Support Brigade (CSBde)
- Headquarters & Headquarters Combat Support Battalion (HHCSB)
- Marine Corps Assault Boat Battalion (MCAABBN)- responsible for day and night transport operations and sea assault missions.
- Combat Engineering Battalion (Provisional) (CEBN (P))- responsible for engineering operations, which includes construction missions to facilitate troop insertion of troops in various terrains, as well as demolition operations.
- Marine Corps Intelligence Battalion (Provisional) (MCIBn (P))- responsible for information gathering and intelligence operations.
- Service Support Regiment (SSR)
- Service Support Battalion (SSBN)

=== General Support & Sustainment Forces ===
The Philippine Marine Corps has several general support & sustainment forces, which are primarily tasked towards force development, headquarters support, and supplies management.

These forces consist of the following:

- Marine Base Arturo Asuncion (MBAA)
- Headquarters & Headquarters Service Group (HHSG)
- Marine Corps Force Development Center (MCFDC)
- Marine Security and Escort Group (MSEG)
- Marine Corps Finance Center (Provisional) (MCFC (P))
- Marine Base Gregorio Lim (MBGL)
- Philippine Marine Corps Supply Company (PMCSC)

==== Marine Security and Escort Group ====
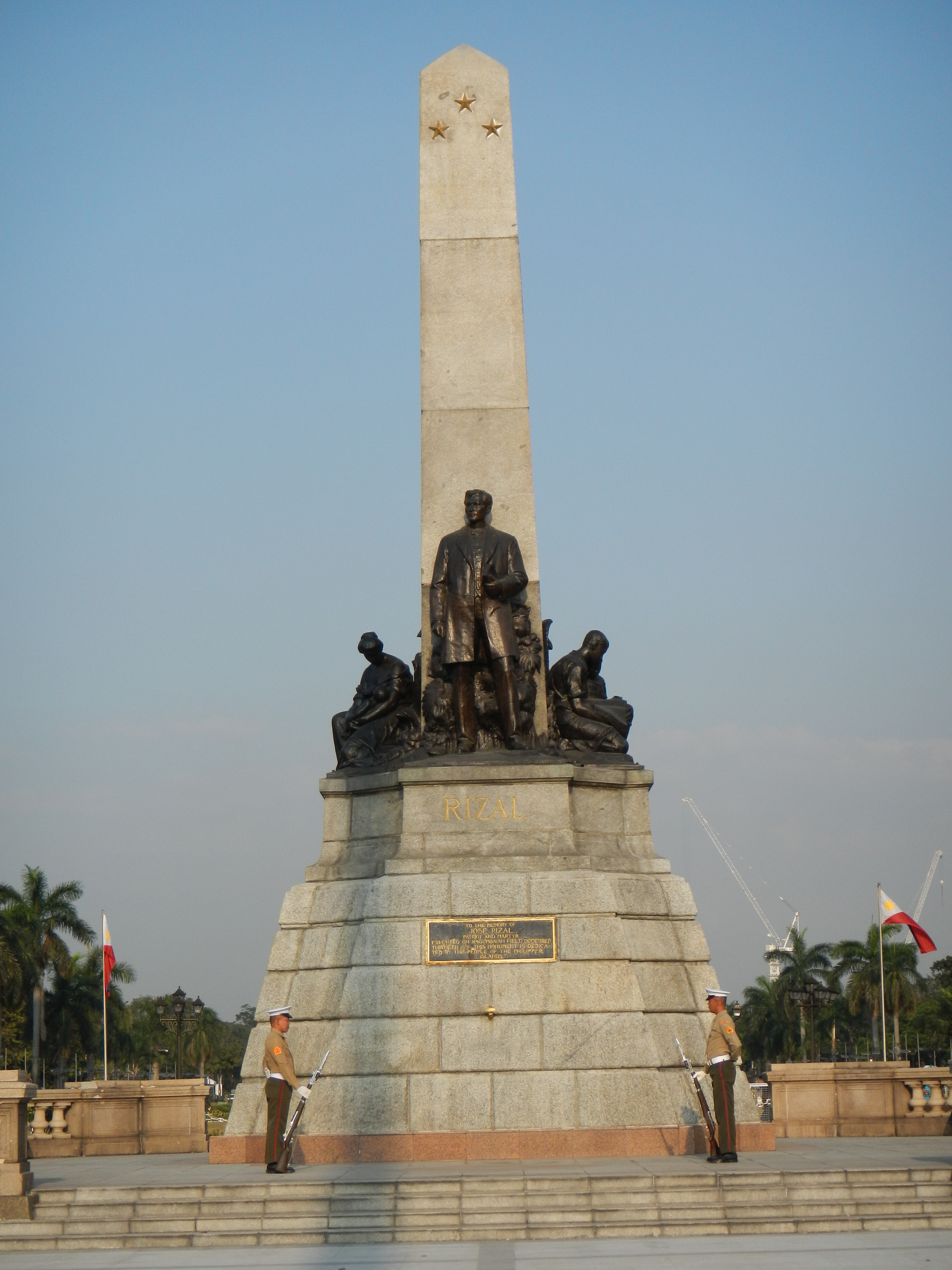
Philippine Marines guarding the Rizal Monument.

The Marine Security and Escort Group (MSEG) is responsible for security of naval facilities and vital government installations, and also the protection of VIPs. The unit also fills most of the PMC's ceremonial duties and mounts the honor guard at the Rizal Monument in Rizal Park, Manila.

== Marine Bases ==
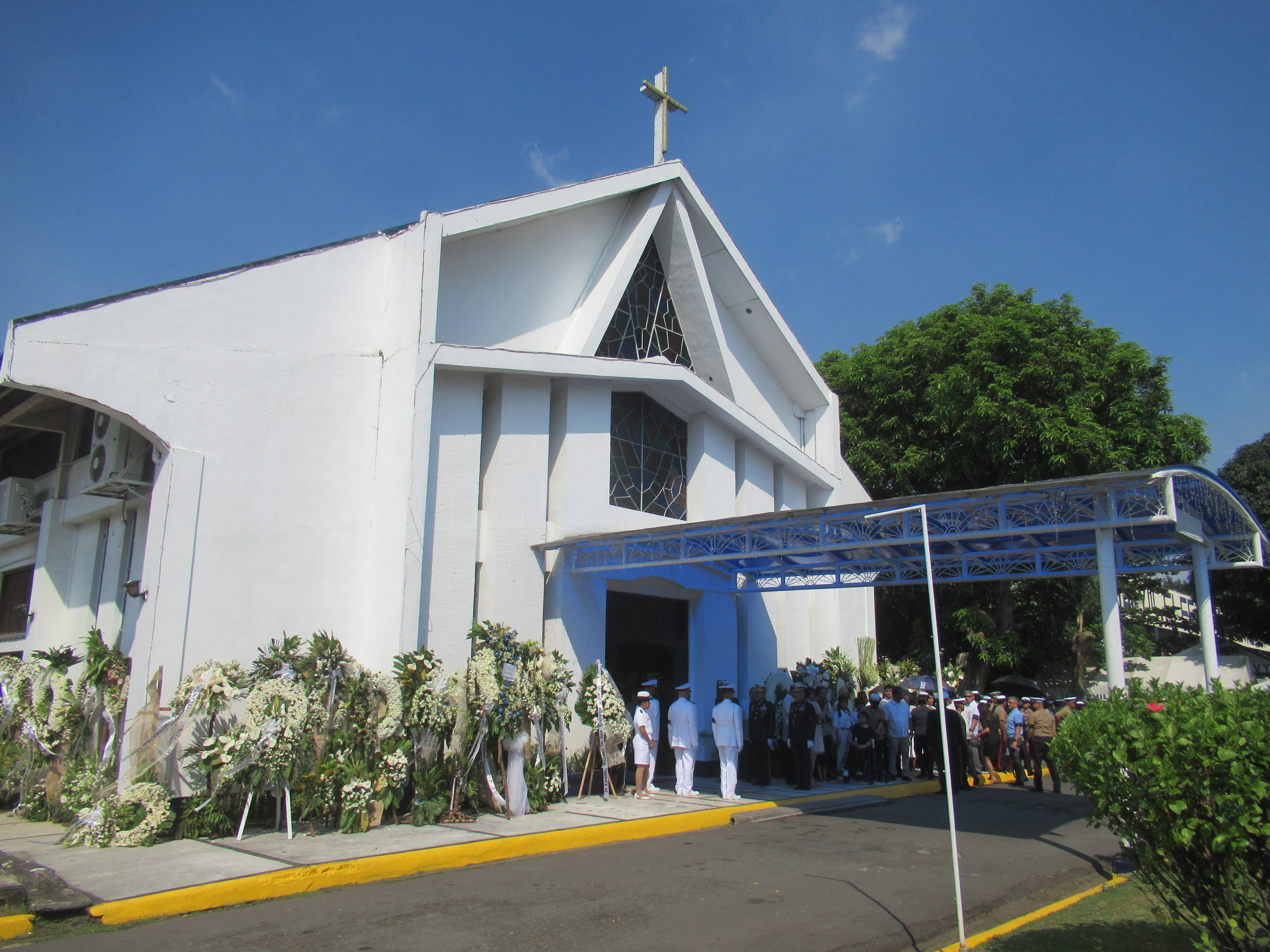
The Holy Child Chapel (Rudiardo Brown, funeral of Rodolfo Biazon)

- Marine Barracks Rudiardo Brown (Marine Base Manila), Fort Bonifacio, Taguig City.
- Marine Barracks Gregorio Lim (Marine Base Ternate), Ternate, Cavite
- Marine Barracks Arturo Asuncion (Marine Base Zamboanga), Zamboanga City
- Marine Barracks Domingo Deluana (Marine Base Tawi-Tawi), Tawi-Tawi
- Camp Gen. Teodulfo Bautista, Jolo, Sulu

In November 2021, the Philippine Marines broke ground for the construction of its new headquarters inside the Bataan Technology Park complex in Morong, Bataan. It will be named after Rodolfo Biazon, who is the first and only Chief of Staff of the AFP from the Marine Corps.

=== The BRP Sierra Madre ===
The BRP Sierra Madre is a Philippine Navy vessel that was intentionally beached off the shoal of Ayungin (also known as the Second Thomas Shoal) in 1999. It has since been occupied by a dozen Filipino Marines, all of whom take turns for an assignment of 5 months in order to assert the rights of sovereignty and jurisdiction of the Philippines on the island against Chinese demands. The history of the building and its occupants was put on the spotlight on March 29, 2014, when journalists were able to take pictures of the Chinese Coast Guard attempting to block a Philippine civilian ship bringing supplies to the Sierra Madre Marines.

== Rank Structure, and Insignias ==
The rank insignias of the Philippine Marine Corps are heavily influenced by those used by their American counterparts, as many of their symbolisms.

=== Commissioned Officers ===
Rank group	General / flag officers				Senior officers			Junior officers
Philippine Marine Corps
Philippine Marine Corps	General	Lieutenant general	Major general	Brigadier general	Colonel	Lieutenant colonel	Major	Captain	First lieutenant	Second lieutenant
Rank group	General / flag officers				Senior officers			Junior officers

=== Enlisted Personnel ===
Rank group	Senior NCOs						Junior NCOs	Enlisted
Philippine Marine Corps
Philippine Marine Corps	Chief master sergeant	Senior master sergeant	Master sergeant	Technical sergeant	Staff sergeant	Sergeant	Corporal	Private first class	Private
Rank group	Senior NCOs						Junior NCOs	Enlisted

== Symbols ==
Seal of the Philippine Marine Corps

=== PMC Seal ===
The PMC Seal incorporates the PMC Emblem inside a red circle, surrounded by a golden scroll showing the Marine Corps motto and Core Values: Karangalan, Katungkulan, Kabayanihan (Honor, Duty, Valor), written in scarlet. Surrounding the Emblem is an outer circle, in blue, with the name of the Philippine Marine Corps, bordered by golden linked chains.

As with the USMC, blue represents the naval heritage while the official Marine Corps colors of scarlet and gold are also present, forming the base of Marine Corps guidons, and all three form the basis for the battle color as opposed to the latter two which is the USMC color basis.

=== PMC Emblem/Insignia ===
The PMC Emblem is composed of the sun with its eight rays from the Flag of the Philippines inside a three-pronged shield. On top of the shield are the three stars (also from the Philippine flag) symbolizing the three major island groups that compose the Philippine archipelago. Behind it is an anchor, symbolizing its heritage from the Philippine Navy. The closed loop rope wrapped around the anchor symbolizes the links of Marines to one another and to show that a Philippine Marine once, a Philippine Marine will always be.

The PMC Emblem is the equivalent of the USMC's Eagle, Globe, and Anchor emblem, bestowed upon newly minted Marines after their Basic Training. While the USMC presents the EGA to graduates in form of anodized pins, the PMC presents its Emblem to its members as an embroidered patch later to be stitched on the wearer's left chest of their Pixelated Battle Dress Uniforms (PBDUs) and later wear an anodized pin version of it on the collars of their Dress Blues, akin to the USMC.

The PMC Emblem (as worn on the Dress Blues)

The PMC Emblem (as worn on the Pixelated Battle Dress Uniform)

The Battle Color of the Philippine Marine Corps

=== PMC Battle Color ===
The battle color is in navy blue with two golden scrolls, one indicating the name of the corps at the top and the other indicating the Marine Corps motto and core values Karangalan, Katungkulan, Kabayanihan (Honor, Duty, Valor), all in red lettering. Both scrolls surround the PMC Seal. The color is similar to the one used by the USMC during the First World War.

It is maintained at the PMC Headquarters at Marine Barracks Rudiardo Brown, Naval Station Jose Francisco in Fort Bonifacio, Taguig City.

=== PMC Hymn ===
The Philippine Marine Corps Hymn was composed by LTSG Cesar Y. Alzona, a Philippine Navy officer who was one of the pioneer Philippine Marines who underwent training at The Basic School of the USMC, who also saw action in the Korean War.

We are the Philippine Marines

A common sight in the fighting scene

Our salty boots are never dry

And people never ask us why

Until they hear our battle cry.

We are the Philippine Marines

Pitted against the toughest fiends

For once we are provoked to fight

They better keep out of our sight

When we unleash our strength and might.

Patrolling shores and seas

Within our country's bounds

We are the fighting bees

We are the sleepless hounds.

We chase the renegades

Up the hill down the rough and rugged roads

Exchanging blows and sharpened blades

Until they're lying dead and cold.

== See also ==
- Philippine Army
- Philippine Navy
- Philippine Air Force
- Philippine Coast Guard
