= Caezar Alzona =

Filipino songwriter

Caezar Yatco Alzona
- Born: September 15, 1925; Laguna, Philippine Islands
- Died: June 27, 1997 (aged 71)
- Spouse: Esperanza Soldevilla Cornejo
- Military career
- Allegiance: Philippines
- Branch: Philippine Navy; Philippine Marine Corps
- Rank: Lieutenant senior grade
- Nicknames: Cesar, Caesar, Caezar
- Service number: O-083399 PN
- Conflicts: Korean War

Caezar Yatco Alzona (September 15, 1925 – June 27, 1997) is a Filipino military officer who is widely credited as the author of the Philippine Marine Corps Hymn.

== Professional military career ==
He served valiantly and received much praise as a military leader in the Philippine Marines of the Philippine Navy (later to be called as the Philippine Marine Corps) against Muslim terrorists and Islamic insurgents in the southern island of Mindanao during the early years of Philippine independence from the United States in the 1950s.

He was also one of the Filipino military personnel sent as part of the United Nations Command during the Korean War.

He was sent to attend the professional United States Marine Corps TBS at Quantico, Virginia, USA.

Aside from composing the Philippine Marine Corps Hymn, Alzon also authored another Marine-themed song, entitled "First to Fight."

== Government service ==
In 1963 he returned to the Philippines to distinguished Philippine government service as a Deputy Assistant Minister of General Services in the cabinet of President Ferdinand Marcos and Executive Director of the Commission on National Integration (CNI) of the Philippines. Throughout decades of government service, he belonged to the 5th Group of the Development Academy of the Philippines, and he named that group the Pentacrons. Alzona also became the Vice President of the Alumni Association of the National Defense College of the Philippines (NDCP).

He had been sent to study in Japan as a teenager, during World War II when Imperial Japan was trying to conquer Asia but subsequently returned to the Philippines as an interpreter in Japanese for the Manila War Crimes trials against Japanese War Criminals who fought against patriotic Filipinos, to include the Bataan Death March. However, to make amends with former collaborators, he joined the Philippine Ambassador to Japan Jose Laurel III to form the Philippine Federation of Japan Alumni (PHILFEJA).

During the time of President Corazon Aquino, he was the Administrator of the Senate of the Philippines, which was still located in the Legislative Building in Manila.

During the time of President Fidel V. Ramos, he was offered the position of Ambassador to Cambodia.

== Personal life ==
As part of the Philippine Military and Diplomatic Corps in Washington DC at the time, Alzona married to socialite Esperanza Soldevilla Cornejo, daughter of prominent Philippine legislator, Miguel R. Cornejo. He established his family there with children Augustus Caesar, Eduardo, Cezarina Barbara and Esperanza Patricia, and made a name in public and civic service.

Upon return to the Philippines and after separation, he had two common-law wives, Natividad Santos of the 1960s Bulakeña Restaurant fame, with whom he had one son, and subsequently Mary Joseline Nueva-Marilao, with whom he had a daughter, Sandra Soraya Alzona.

== Death ==
He died on June 27, 1997, aged 71, and is buried at the Libingan ng mga Bayani (Cemetery of the Heroes) for national patriots, in Fort Bonifacio (formerly Fort McKinley) in Taguig, Metro Manila.
