= List of leaders of the communist rebellion in the Philippines =

Many military leaders played a role in the Communist insurgency. This list is a compilation of some of the relevant leaders among the participants in the war. To be listed here, an individual must satisfy one of the following criteria:

- to maintain peace and order
- Most of them are leaders or high-ranking military officials, especially the president.
- the operations in the conflict must be conducted militarily.

In 1972, Ferdinand Marcos declared martial law in response to rising social unrest and the rising insurgency by the Communist Party of the Philippines and its armed wing, the New People's Army. Throughout the conflict, foreign countries such as the socialist states China and Vietnam, aided the insurgency while the United States supported the Philippine government and Marcos Regime.

== Government ==
=== Commander-in-Chief ===
- Ferdinand Marcos (1965-1986) was the first president to face the insurgency, whose militarized dictatorship led to significant popular support for and rapid growth of the NPA.
- Corazon Aquino (1986-1992) was the Philippines' first female president, assuming power after the Marcos Administration was deposed in the 1986 EDSA Revolution.
- Fidel Ramos (1992-1998) was previously the Vice Chief of Staff of the Armed Forces of the Philippines under the Marcos Administration and Chief of Staff under Corazon Aquino's administration before being elected president in 1992.
- Joseph Estrada (1998-2001) is a Filipino actor who became the second president to be deposed from office, following public outrage against government corruption that culminated in the 2001 EDSA Revolution.
- Gloria Macapagal Arroyo (2001-2010) was Estrada's vice president and the daughter of former president Diosdado Macapagal, becoming the Philippines' second female president following Estrada's ouster.
- Benigno Aquino III (2010-2016) is the son of former president Corazon Aquino. His administration oversaw the arrest of CPP-NPA chairman Benito Tiamzon and his wife, CPP-NPA secretary general Wilma Tiamzon.
- Rodrigo Duterte (2016–2022) is the first Philippine president from Mindanao. After releasing communist leaders including the Tiamzon couple and attempting an alliance with far-left organizations, Duterte backtracked and declared the CPP–NPA a terrorist organization.
- Bongbong Marcos (2022–present) is the son of Ferdinand Marcos and current president of the Philippines.

=== Chiefs of Staff ===
- General Manuel T. Yan - served as the youngest chief of staff of the Armed Forces of the Philippines at the age of 48. Prior to that, he was the chief of the Philippine Constabulary. He currently holds the record for longest continuous government service from 1937 to 2001 or 64 years of service.
- General Romeo Espino, served as the commanding general of the Philippine Army before being appointed to become the top military man. Espino is the longest-serving chief of staff of the Armed Forces of the Philippines for nine years, especially during the martial law regime. A second product of the ROTC. During his term, he was fair in administering the military, unlike his successor, General Fabian Ver.
- General Fabian Ver - is considered a loyalist and the second most powerful man in the country next to President Ferdinand Marcos in the later years of his authoritarian regime, replacing then Defense Secretary Juan Ponce Enrile. He also served as commander of the Presidential Security Command and the director-general of NISA, the Marcos regime's secret police. During his term, he was known for his favoritism, especially in the promotion of officers.
- General Fidel V. Ramos - before becoming the chief of the now-defunct Philippine Constabulary in 1972, he was the commander of the Philippine Army's 3rd Division in Cebu. In the 1980s, he was promoted to vice-chief of staff with the rank of lieutenant general but remained as PC chief. After the EDSA revolt that ousted Marcos, he became the AFP chief of staff. He retired from the position and then served as Secretary of National Defense until he was elected President of the Philippines in 1992.
- General Rodolfo Biazon - served in the Philippine Senate and the House of Representatives after his retirement as AFP chief of staff in 1991. He is the first and only Chief of Staff from the PMC. Before that, he served as the commander of the AFP NCR Defense Command in 1988 and Commandant of the Philippine Marine Corps in 1987. He had also served as the superintendent of the Philippine Military Academy on 1986.
- General Gregorio Pio Catapang - served in the AFP Northern Luzon Command before becoming AFP Chief from July 18, 2014 – July 10, 2015.
- General Hernando Iriberri - served as Army Chief between February 7, 2014 – July 15, 2015, until he became AFP Chief from July 10, 2015 – April 22, 2016.
- Lieutenant General Glorioso Miranda - served in the AFP Northern Luzon Command and became Acting AFP Chief and Commanding General of the Philippine Army.
- General Ricardo Visaya - served in the AFP Southern Luzon Command and became AFP Chief from July 1, 2016 – December 7, 2016.
- General Eduardo Año - served in the 10th Infantry Division (Philippines), Commanding General of the Philippine Army and became AFP Chief from July 14, 2015 – December 7, 2016.
- General Rey Leonardo Guerrero - served in the AFP Eastern Mindanao Command and became AFP Chief from October 26, 2017 - April 18, 2018.

== Communist Party ==
=== Leaders ===
- Jose Maria Sison #, founding chairman of the Communist Party of the Philippines, a political consultant for the National Democratic Front of the Philippines.
- Fidel Agcaoili † #, chief negotiator of the NDFP.
- Bernabe Buscayno, founder of the New People's Army, no longer associated with the CPP-NPA-NDF.
- Gregorio "Ka Roger" Rosal † #, spokesperson of the CPP-NPA.
- Benito Tiamzon †, alleged chairman of the CPP, an NDFP consultant.
- Wilma Tiamzon †, alleged secretary-general of the CPP, an NDFP consultant.
- Jorge Madlos †, spokesperson of the NPA National Operational Command.
- Jaime Padilla (POW), spokesperson of the NPA - Southern Tagalog Melito Glor Command.
- Adelberto Silva (POW), one of the top NDFP consultants.
- Leoncio Pitao †, NPA commander in Mindanao.
- Concha Araneta-Bocala †, alleged head of the CPP's Panay regional committee.

=== Rejectionists ===
- Domingo Tarectecan (RPA) (POW)
- Francisco Pascual (RPA) (surrendered)
- Filemon "Ka Popoy" Lagman (ABB) †
- Conrado Balweg (CPLA) †
