= Rolando Joselito Bautista =

Filipino lieutenant general

Retired Lieutenant General Rolando Joselito Bautista AFP
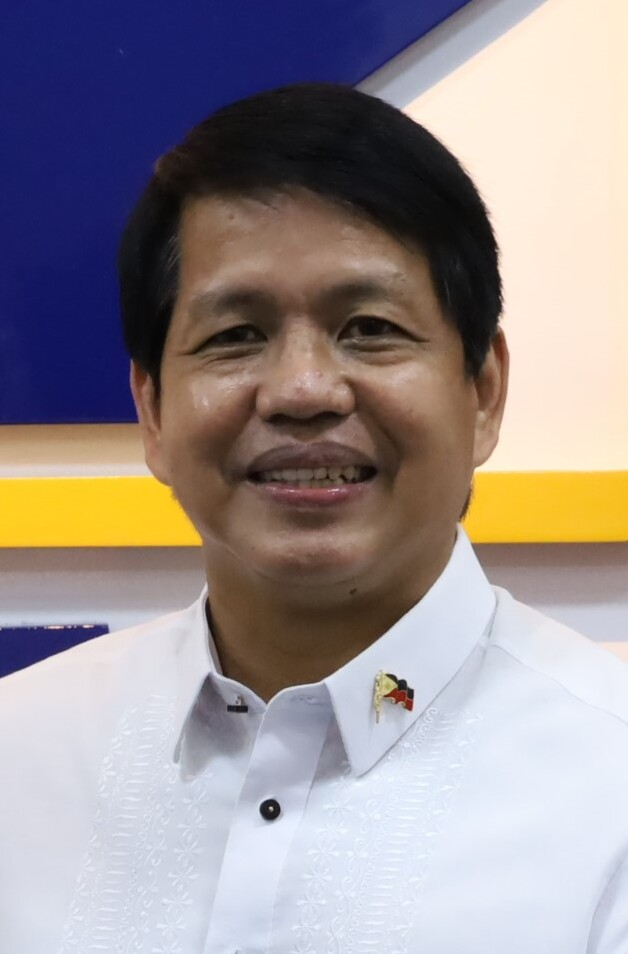
- Bautista in 2022

27th Secretary of Social Welfare and Development
- In office October 17, 2018 – June 30, 2022
- President: Rodrigo Duterte
- Preceded by: Virginia Orogo
- Succeeded by: Erwin Tulfo

Commanding General of the Philippine Army
- In office October 5, 2017 – October 15, 2018
- President: Rodrigo Duterte
- Preceded by: Glorioso Miranda
- Succeeded by: Macairog S. Alberto

Personal details
- Born: October 15, 1962 (age 63) Naguilian, La Union, Philippines
- Education: Philippine Military Academy

Military service
- Allegiance: Philippines
- Branch/service: Philippine Army
- Years of service: 1985–2018
- Rank: Lieutenant General
- Unit: Commanding General of the Philippine Army; Joint Task Force Marawi; 1st Infantry Division; Presidential Security Group; 104th Infantry Brigade, 1 ID; Joint Task Group Basilan; Task Force General Santos; 73rd Infantry Battalion, 10 ID
- Battles/wars: Moro conflict Communist rebellion in the Philippines; Battle of Marawi

Rolando Joselito Delizo Bautista (born October 15, 1962) is a retired Filipino lieutenant general who served as the Secretary of Social Welfare and Development under the Duterte administration from 2018 to 2022. He held various positions in the military, such as the former Commanding General of the Philippine Army, commander of the Joint Task Force Marawi during the Battle of Marawi, and the Presidential Security Group.

== Military background ==
A graduate in the Philippine Military Academy, Bautista is a member of the PMA “Sandiwa” class of 1985 and took various preparatory and specialization courses in intelligence and counter-terrorist operations. Bautista completed various intelligence, counter-terrorism, infantry, and other related courses in the country and abroad, such as the AFP Command and General Staff Course at the Armed Forces of the Philippines Command and General Staff College and the VIP Protective Detail Course at the US Embassy in Manila. He is also a Scout Ranger-trained General, and is a qualified member of the Special Forces. During his junior years, then-Lieutenant Bautista, along with then-Lieutenant Carlito Galvez Jr. and other AFP troops were part of the Reform the Armed Forces Movement (RAM), under the leadership then-Colonel Gregorio Honasan, and participated in the 1989 failed coup attempt against President Corazon Aquino. Bautista and his conspirators were arrested before being granted amnesty by President Fidel Ramos in 1996.

Lieutenant General Bautista is a well-known Mindanao Veteran, described as "well-rounded", "silent worker", an "achiever", and a "workaholic". He also served at the United Nations Transitional Administration in East Timor. He led the 73rd Infantry Battalion of the 10th Infantry Division in 2005–2007, and the Unified Command Staff Chief of the AFP Northern Luzon Command, from February 2012 to October 2013, the Task Force General Santos and the Joint Task Group Basilan. In 2014, he served as the commander of the Joint Task Group Basilan and the 104th Infantry Brigade of the 1st Infantry Division, replacing then-Brigadier General Carlito Galvez Jr. During the Duterte Administration, he quickly rose through the ranks, as he led the Presidential Security Group in 2016. After finishing his 10 month stint, he was then transferred to the 1st Infantry Division in Mindanao, and was promoted to Major General for his counter-terrorism expertise.

Then-Major General Bautista served as the overall ground commander of the Joint Task Force Marawi during the Battle of Marawi, where he, along with then-Lieutenant General Carlito Galvez Jr. and other AFP generals spearheaded the overall military operations against the Maute group and the Abu Sayyaf. He also implemented innovative tactics and strategies against the terrorists, such as placing wood and steel planks on the AFP's armored vehicles to counter against enemy RPGs. On October 5, 2017, as the final phase of operations in Marawi materialized, he was appointed by President Rodrigo Duterte as the Commanding General of the Philippine Army, replacing then-Army Chief Lieutenant General Glorioso Miranda, and was promoted to Lieutenant General. As the Chief of the Philippine Army, he led the formulations of new doctrines and changes in the army's modernization program against terrorism, communist insurgencies, and external defense, as part of the lessons learned from urban warfare. He retired from military service on October 15, 2018, as he was replaced by then-Commander of the Intelligence Service of the AFP (ISAFP) Major General Macairog S. Alberto.

== Awards in military service ==
- Philippine Republic Presidential Unit Citation
- Martial Law Unit Citation
- People Power I Unit Citation
- People Power II Unit Citation
- 2 Grand Commander medals, Philippine Legion of Honor
- Outstanding Achievement Medals
- Distinguished Service Stars
- Gawad sa Kaunlaran medals
- Bronze Cross Medal
- Military Merit Medals with one spearhead device, 3 silver and 1 bronze anahaws
- Military Civic Action Medal
- Military Commendation Medals
- United Nations Service Medal
- United Nations Transitional Administration in East Timor (UNTAET) Ribbon
- Long Service Medal
- Anti-dissidence Campaign Medal
- Luzon Anti-Dissidence Campaign Medal
- Visayas Anti-Dissidence Campaign Medal
- Mindanao Anti-Dissidence Campaign Medal
- Disaster Relief and Rehabilitation Operations Ribbon
- Combat Commander's Badge
- Scout Ranger Qualification Badge
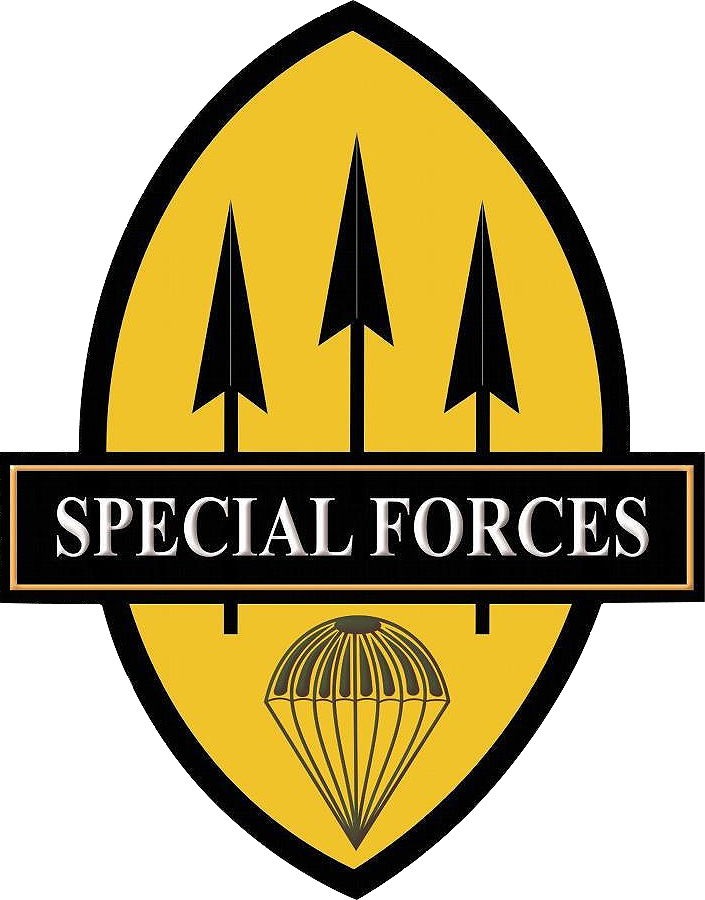
- Special Forces Qualification Badge
- AFP Parachutist Badge
- Presidential Security Group Badge
- AFP Command and General Staff Course Badge
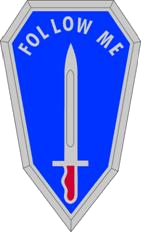
- United States Army Infantry School Badge

== Controversy with Erwin Tulfo ==
His stint as Secretary of Social Welfare and Development came with a controversy involving him and journalist/broadcaster Erwin Tulfo, after the latter threatened him and gave tirades on-air on his radio show Tutok Tulfo on Radyo Pilipinas. Sec. Bautista was not available while having a meeting with an ambassador at the moment Tulfo's team was reaching him for a live, on-air interview regarding about the DSWD's plans on a recent signing of anti-poverty measure Magna Carta of the Poor.

Military offices
Preceded by Glorioso Miranda	Commanding General of the Philippine Army; 2017-2018	Succeeded by Macairog S. Alberto
Political offices
Preceded by Virginia Orogo	Secretary of Social Welfare and Development; 2018–2022	Succeeded by Erwin Tulfo
