= Eduardo Año =

Filipino government official and retired army general

Retired General Eduardo M. Año PA
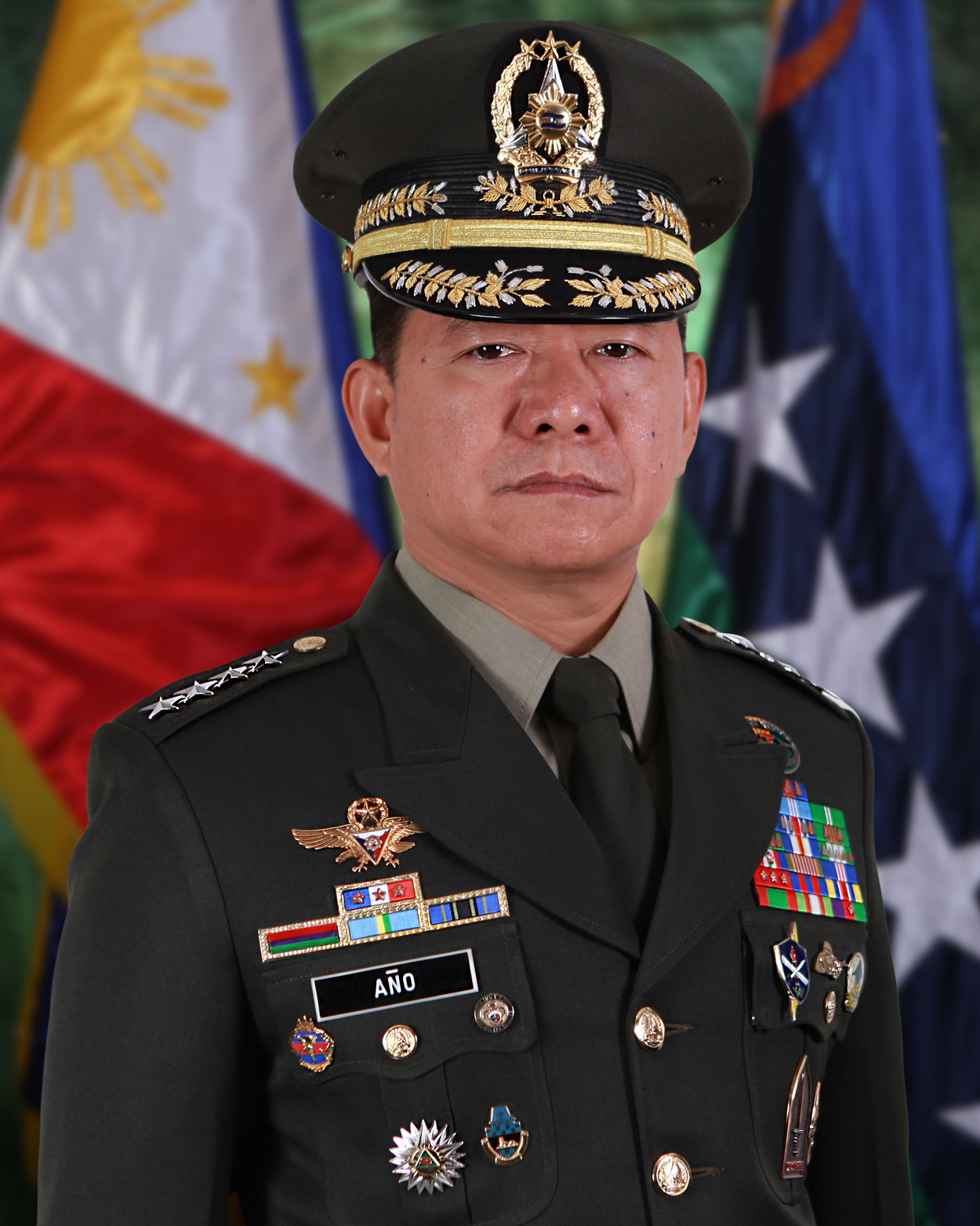
- Portrait as Chief of Staff

National Security Adviser
- In office January 14, 2023 – April 15, 2026
- President: Bongbong Marcos
- Preceded by: Clarita Carlos
- Succeeded by: Eduardo Oban

40th Secretary of the Interior and Local Government
- In office November 6, 2018 – June 30, 2022; Officer-in-Charge: January 5, 2018 – November 6, 2018
- President: Rodrigo Duterte
- Preceded by: Usec. Catalino Cuy (OIC)
- Succeeded by: Benhur Abalos

Undersecretary of the Department of the Interior and Local Government
- In office October 26, 2017 – January 4, 2018
- President: Rodrigo Duterte

48th Chief of Staff of the Armed Forces of the Philippines
- In office December 7, 2016 – October 26, 2017
- President: Rodrigo Duterte
- Preceded by: Gen. Ricardo Visaya
- Succeeded by: Gen. Rey Leonardo Guerrero

Commanding General of the Philippine Army
- In office July 14, 2015 – December 7, 2016
- President: Benigno Aquino III; Rodrigo Duterte
- Preceded by: Lt Gen. Hernando Iriberri
- Succeeded by: Lt. Gen. Glorioso Miranda

Vice Chairman of the National Task Force Against COVID-19
- In office March 16, 2020 – June 30, 2022
- President: Rodrigo Duterte
- Preceded by: Position established
- Succeeded by: Vacant

Co-Vice Chairman of the National Task Force to End Local Communist Armed Conflict
- In office January 14, 2023 – April 15, 2026 Serving with Sara Duterte (2023–2024)
- President: Bongbong Marcos
- Preceded by: Clarita Carlos
- Succeeded by: Eduardo Oban

Personal details
- Born: Eduardo Manahan Año; October 26, 1961 (age 64) San Mateo, Rizal, Philippines
- Education: Philippine Military Academy(BS)

Military service
- Allegiance: Philippines
- Branch/service: Philippine Army
- Years of service: 1983–2017
- Rank: General
- Unit: Chief of Staff, AFP; Commanding General, PA; Division Commander, 10th Infantry Division, PA; Intelligence Service of the Armed Forces of the Philippines (ISAFP); Intelligence and Security Group, Philippine Army (ISG, PA)
- Battles/wars: Moro conflict; Communist rebellion in the Philippines; Marawi crisis

Eduardo Manahan Año (Tagalog: [ʔɛdˈwaɾdo ˈaɲo]; born October 26, 1961) is a retired Philippine Army general who served as the Chief of Staff of the Armed Forces of the Philippines from 2016 to 2017, and the Commanding General of the Philippine Army from 2015 to 2016. After retiring from the military, he served as Secretary of the Interior and Local Government in the Cabinet of President Rodrigo Duterte from 2018 to 2022 then as National Security Adviser in the administration of President Bongbong Marcos from 2023 to 2026.

During the COVID-19 pandemic in the Philippines, Año, along with the rest of the Philippine government's Cabinet Secretaries, became part of the Inter-Agency Task Force for the Management of Emerging Infectious Diseases, a task force formed to advise the President on the strategies which would effectively manage the spread of COVID-19 in the country.

== Life and career ==
=== Military career ===
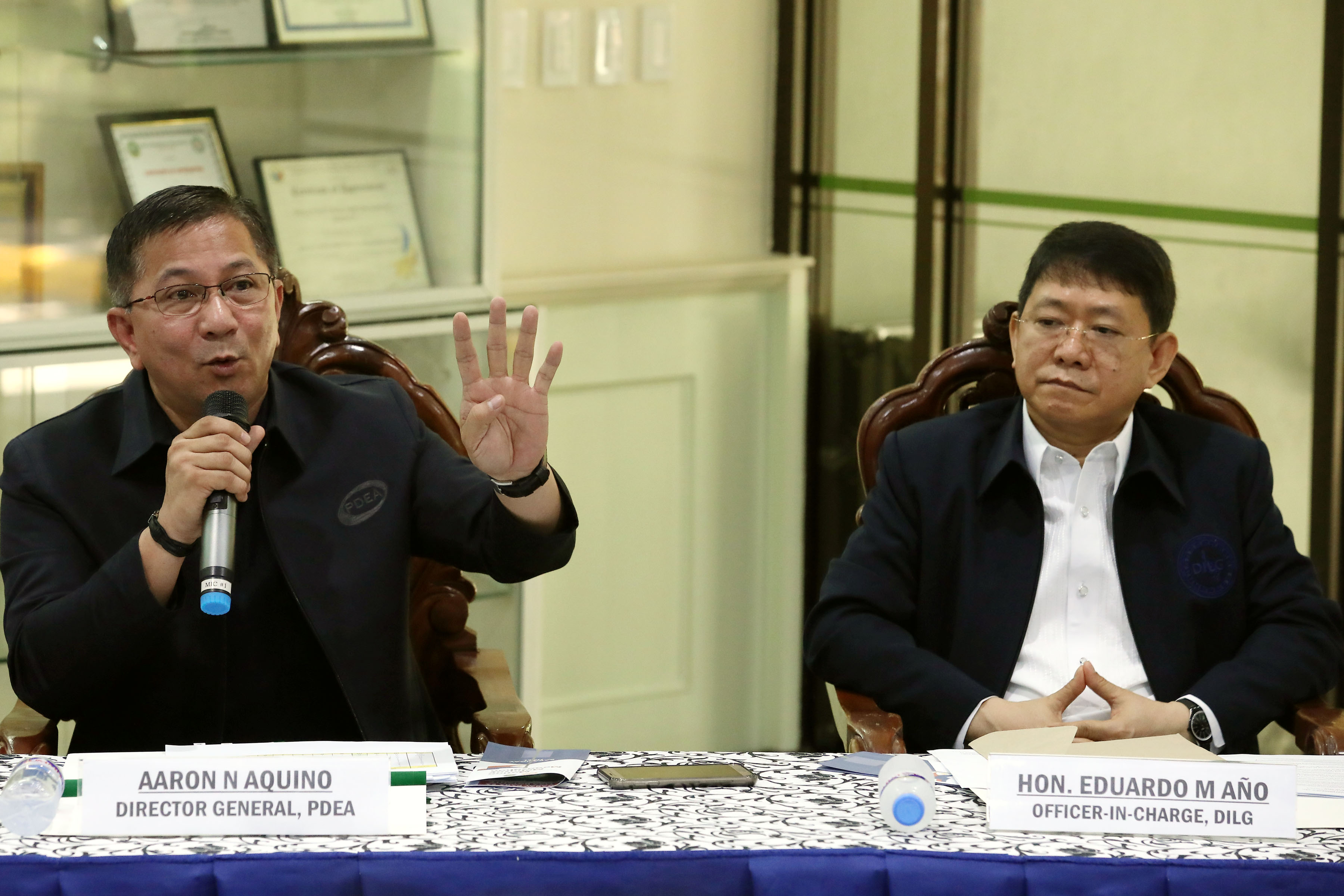
Then DILG officer-in-charge Eduardo M. Año with PDEA Director General Aaron Aquino during a press conference at the PDEA office in Quezon City, April 30, 2018.

Eduardo Manahan Año was born in San Mateo, Rizal on October 26, 1961. He graduated elementary as valedictorian. He entered the Philippine Military Academy and became a member of the PMA Matikas class of 1983, where he graduated as Cum Laude. He is also a graduate of the Scout Ranger Course and took courses in the U.S. Army Intelligence Center and School in Arizona, and in the Israel Counter Terrorism Center in 2002. He finished on the top of his class in the International Officer Intelligence Course at Fort Huachuca, Arizona in 1993, by earning a 100 percent grade rating in the course. He also graduated Number One in all the military career courses he undertook namely; Command and General Staff Course, Infantry Officers Advance Course, Infantry Officers Basic Course and Tactical Intelligence Officer Course.

Año held various military positions primarily in the Military Intelligence Positions, before being appointed in infantry positions, such as commander of the Intelligence and Security Group of the Philippine Army, chief of the Intelligence Service of the Armed Forces of the Philippines (ISAFP), and commander of the 10th Infantry (Agila) Division. During his military service, he led the capture of Benito and Wilma Tiamzon of the Communist Party of the Philippines in 2014, as well as the death of a New People's Army Commander, Leonardo Pitao, known as "Kumander Prago" in his term as commander of the 10th Infantry Division. As ISAFP chief, Año was implicated in the kidnapping of activist Jonas Burgos. He was also accused of red-tagging civilians killed during the "Bloody Sunday" massacre.

Año also served as the 57th Commanding General of the Philippine Army from July 14, 2015, to December 7, 2016, after he succeeded General Hernando Iriberri, where he continued his predecessor's approach in modernizing the Army while further enhancing the Army's intelligence capabilities, and strengthening the country's alliances with other countries such as the United States and ASEAN member states. Año was eventually named the 48th Chief of Staff of the Armed Forces of the Philippines after serving his term as Army chief for 1 year and 5 months, from December 7, 2016, to October 26, 2017.

He received the Philippine Military Academy Cavalier Award in 1996 as an outstanding PMA Alumnus in the field of Army Operations. He is also a recipient of the Philippine Legion of Honor (Degree of Chief Commander) and the Panglima Gagah Angkatan Tentera (PGAT) by the King of Malaysia.

==== Battle of Marawi ====
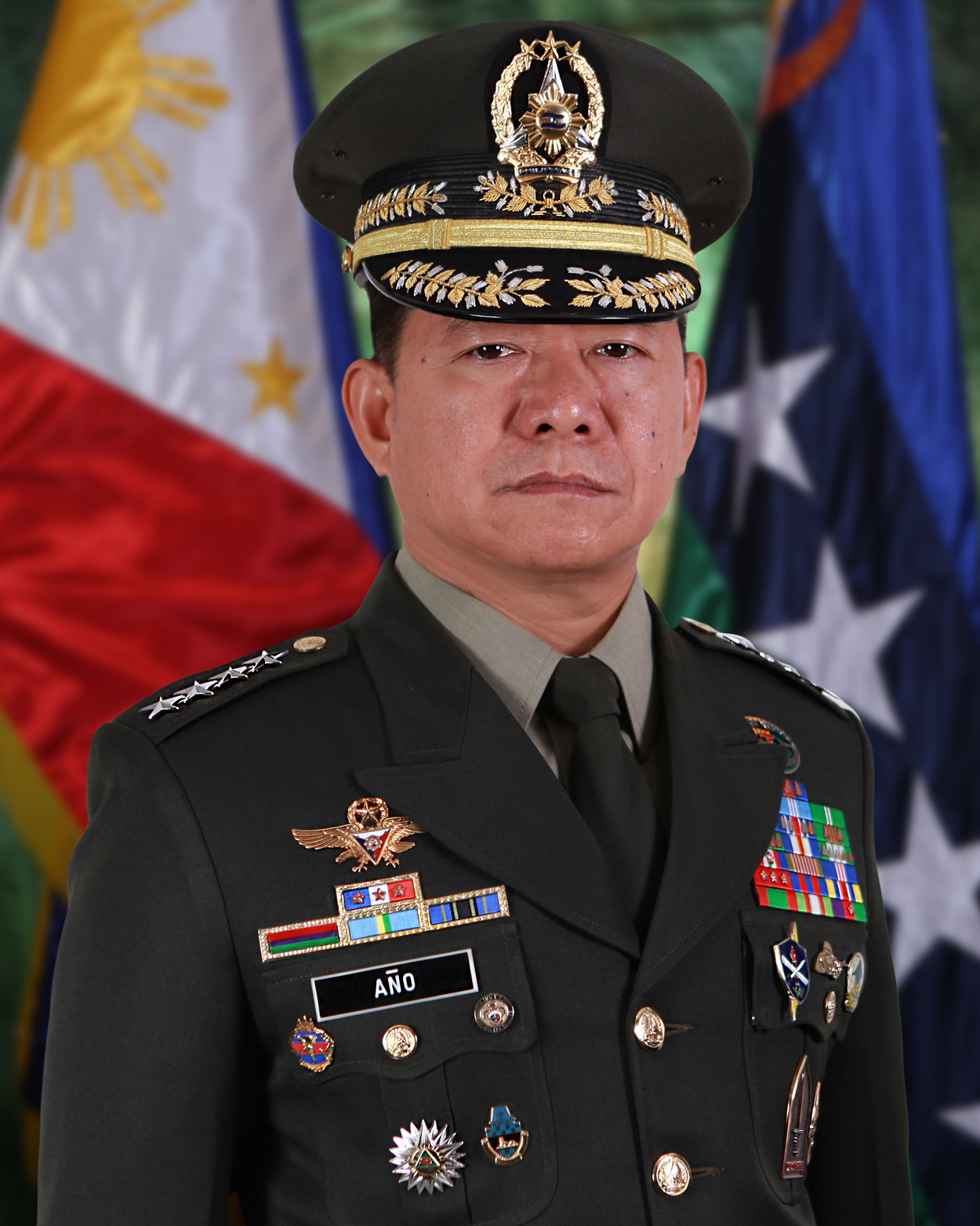
Official portrait of Año as the AFP Chief of Staff.

During his term as the Chief of Staff of the AFP, he initiated and oversaw overall military operations against the Maute and Abu Sayyaf terrorist groups during the 5-month long Battle of Marawi and launched an offensive operation to retake Marawi City and secure the city's outskirts to prevent any terrorist reinforcements entering the city, while encircling the city from all directions. Afterwards, he was appointed Martial Law Administrator in Mindanao during the declaration of martial law under Proclamation No. 216. As Año's term as Chief of Staff was scheduled to end within October 26, 2017, he spent his last weeks in office finalizing the AFP's final offensive within Marawi City and killing the terrorist group's two key commanders, Isnilon Hapilon and Omar Maute on October 16, 2017. 1 week later, on October 23, 2017, Año, along with Defense Secretary Delfin Lorenzana announced the end of all military operations within Marawi City. Año formally retired from military three days after the declaration of the conclusion of the Marawi Siege and was replaced by then-commander of the AFP Eastern Mindanao Command, Lieutenant General Rey Leonardo Guerrero.

=== Secretary of the Interior and Local Government ===
President Rodrigo Duterte designated Año as officer-in-charge of the Department of the Interior and Local Government (DILG) in January 2018. Año could not be given the secretary post immediately because Republic Act 6975 prevents a retired or resigned military officer from being appointed as a secretary within one year from the date of their retirement or resignation. He formally took oath as Secretary of the Interior and Local Government on November 6, 2018. Human rights group Karapatan criticized Año's appointment to the DILG. Karapatan said that the Duterte administration tends to reward human rights violators instead of prosecuting them, adding that this allows impunity to prevail in the Philippines and noting how Año was implicated in the enforced disappearance of activist Jonas Burgos.

As the secretary of the Department of the Interior and Local Government, Año ordered local chief executives to spearhead the fight against COVID-19 in their own areas of jurisdictions. He also exacted accountability from LGU and barangay officials who violate the policies, guidelines, and protocols issued by the IATF-EID. Año supported the Duterte drug war around the time that International Criminal Court prosecutor Fatou Bensouda requested authorization to investigate possible crimes against humanity committed during the drug war.

Año ordered the shift in the government's counter-insurgency drive, involving governors, mayors, and village chiefs to ensure good local governance and shared accountability with the private sector, civil society organizations, and the citizenry to address the issues which cause rifts and misunderstandings between government and the people. His term as secretary ended on June 30, 2022, the last day of the Duterte administration.

=== National Security Adviser ===
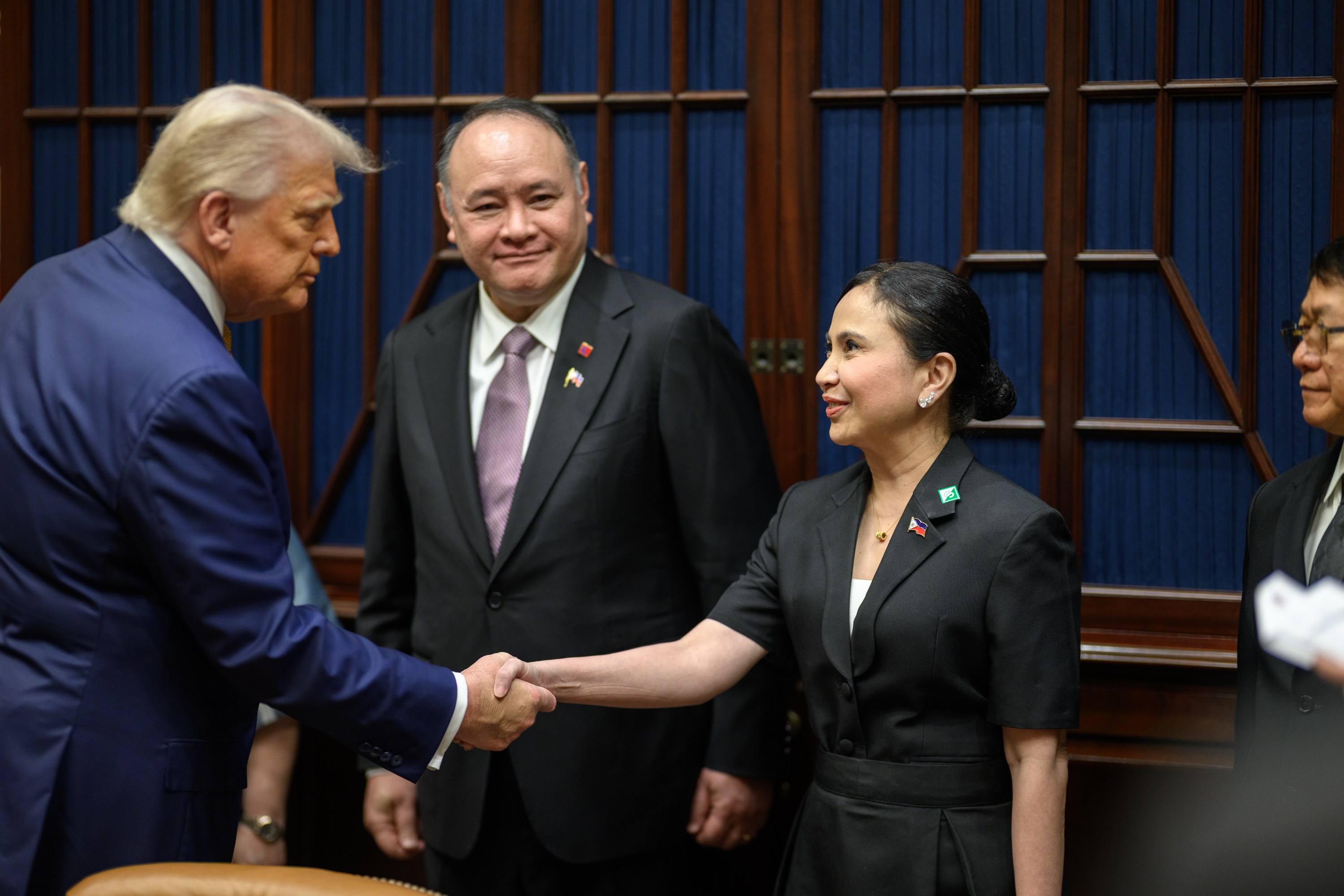
National Security Adviser Eduardo Año (2nd, right), Defense Secretary Gilbert Teodoro (center), and Trade and Industry Secretary Cristina Aldeguer-Roque (1st, right) meets U.S. President Donald Trump (left) at the Roosevelt Room in the White House in Washington, D.C., July 22, 2025.

On January 14, 2023, President Bongbong Marcos appointed Año as National Security Adviser, replacing political scientist and commentator Clarita Carlos.

In 2023, Año was the subject of protests by human rights groups due to his alleged judicial harassment of a Quezon City judge and human rights activists.

On April 15, 2026, Año has formally resigned from his position as the National Security Adviser and was eventually accepted by President Bongbong Marcos, citing health concerns "that require my full attention and care" and "has become apparent that I must prioritize my health and well-being". He later thanked President Marcos for the trust given to him, his fellow cabinet members, and the national security community for their professionalism. Año was replaced by former AFP Chief Eduardo Oban.

== Awards ==
=== Military Awards ===
- Philippine Legion of Honor- Degree of Chief Commander (2017)
- 4 Distinguished Service Star
- Gold Cross Medals
- Silver Cross Medal
- 24 Bronze Cross Medal for intelligence operations
- 36 Military Merit Medals
- 10 Military Commendation Medal
- Silver Wing Medal
- Gawad sa Kaunlaran
- Sagisag ng Ulirang Kawal
- Military Civic Action Medal
- Parangal sa Kapanalig ng Sandatahang Lakas ng Pilipinas

=== Military Campaign and Service Medals ===
- Long Service Medal with three bronze service stars
- Anti-Dissidence Campaign Medal with one bronze service star
- Luzon Anti Dissidence Campaign Medal with one bronze service star
- Mindanao Anti-Dissidence Campaign Medal
- Jolo and Sulu Campaign Medal
- Disaster Relief & Rehabilitation Operation Ribbon with one bronze service star

=== Military Unit Citations ===
- Philippine Republic Presidential Unit Citation
- Martial Law Unit Citation
- People Power I Unit Citation
- People Power II Unit Citation

=== Foreign Honors ===
- Honorary Courageous Commander of The Most Gallant Order of Military Service
- Commander, Legion of Merit

=== Military Badges ===
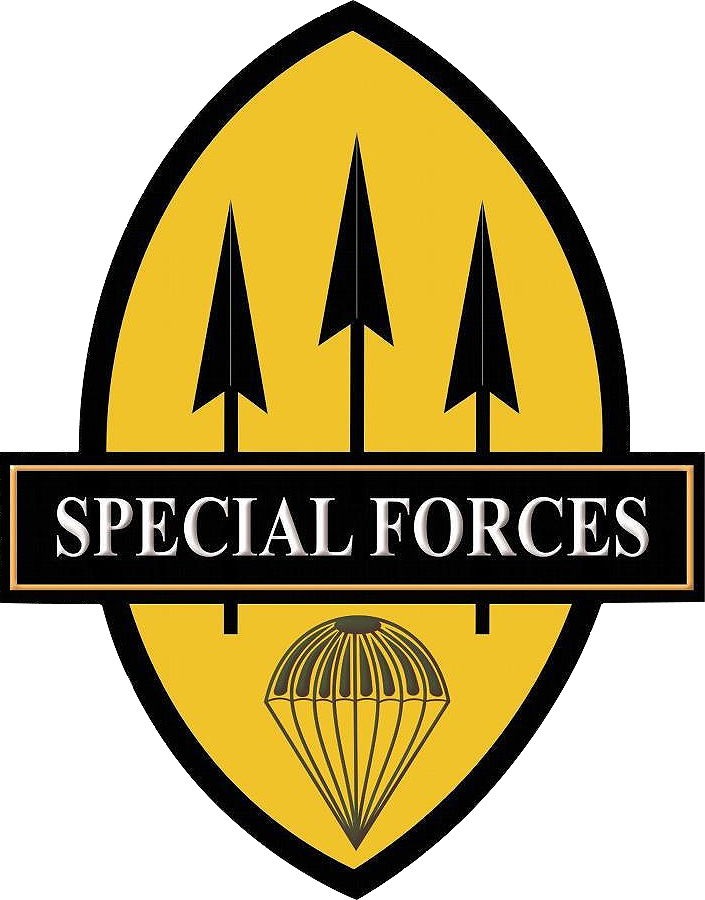
- Special Forces Qualification Badge
- Combat Commander's Badge (Philippines)
- Scout Ranger Qualification Badge
- Philippine Army Command and General Staff Course Badge
- PAF Gold Wings Badge
- PMA Cavalier Award

=== Other Awards ===
- PMA Cavalier Award for Army Operations in 1996
- PMA Cavalier Award for Public Administration in 2021
- PMA Outstanding Achievement Award as Secretary, Department of Interior and Local Government
- PMA Outstanding Achievement Award as Chief of Staff Armed Forces of the Philippines
- PMA Outstanding Achievement Award as Commanding General Philippine Army
- Most Outstanding Anak ng San Mateo, Rizal Award - 2022
- 2024 Asia’s Modern Hero Awards

== Personal life ==
Eduardo Año is married to Jean Joselyn Maria R. Dioso and they have four children namely, Edwin Jr., Edward, Janelle Marie and Jasmine Claire. Año also underwent two heart bypass surgeries in 2021 and took two months of recovery instead of several days due to "many complications". He also stated that his two surgeries followed his two infections of COVID-19 that has affected his health, citing that he felt "very different" as he experiences difficulty breathing and rapid heartbeats.

Military offices
Preceded by Lt Gen. Hernando Iriberri	Commanding General of the Philippine Army; 2015–2016	Succeeded by Lt Gen. Glorioso Miranda
Preceded by Gen. Ricardo Visaya	Chief of Staff of the Armed Forces of the Philippines; 2016–2017	Succeeded by Gen. Rey Leonardo Guerrero
Political offices
Preceded by Catalino Cuy; Officer-in-charge	Secretary of the Interior and Local Government; 2018–2022	Succeeded by Benjamin Abalos Jr.
New title	Vice Chairman of the National Task Force Against COVID-19; 2020–2022	Vacant
Preceded by Clarita Carlos	National Security Adviser; 2023–present	Incumbent
Preceded by Clarita Carlos	Co-Vice Chairman of the National Task Force to End Local Communist Armed Conflict; 2023–2026; Served alongside: Sara Duterte	Incumbent
Order of precedence
Preceded by Dave Gomez as Secretary of the Presidential Communications Office	Order of Precedence of the Philippines as National Security Adviser and Director-General of the National Security Council	Succeeded by Elaine Masukat as Head of the Presidential Management Staff
