= Glorioso Miranda =

Filipino general (born 1961)

Lt. Gen. Glorioso V. Miranda AFP (Ret.)
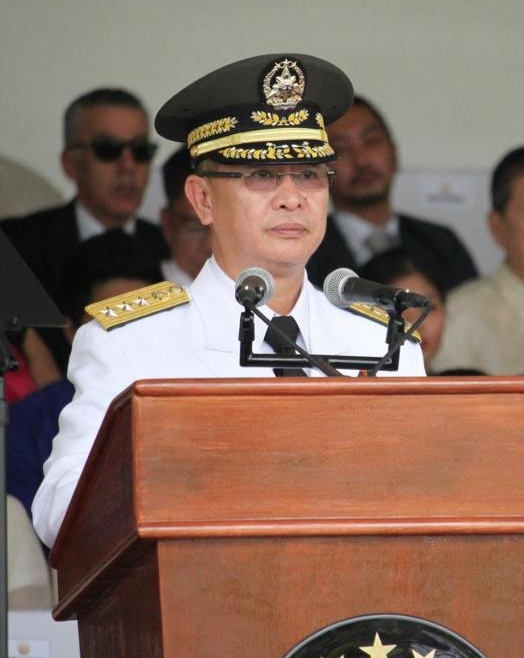

Commanding General of the Philippine Army
- In office December 7, 2016 – October 5, 2017
- President: Rodrigo Duterte
- Preceded by: Lt. Gen. Eduardo Año
- Succeeded by: Lt. Gen. Rolando Joselito Bautista

46th Vice Chief of Staff of the Armed Forces of the Philippines
- In office March 8, 2016 – January 12, 2017
- President: Benigno Aquino III; Rodrigo Duterte
- Preceded by: Lt. Gen. Romeo Tanalgo
- Succeeded by: Lt. Gen. Salvador Melchor Mison, Jr., PAF

Acting Chief of Staff of the Armed Forces of the Philippines
- In office April 22, 2016 – June 30, 2016
- President: Benigno Aquino III
- Preceded by: Gen. Hernando Iriberri
- Succeeded by: Gen. Ricardo Visaya, PA

26th Commander of the AFP Northern Luzon Command
- In office August 13, 2015 – March 8, 2016
- Preceded by: Lt. Gen. Gregorio Catapang Jr.
- Succeeded by: Lt. Gen. Emmanuel B. Salamat, PMC

Commander of the 7th Infantry Division, PA
- In office April 2, 2014 – August 13, 2015

Personal details
- Born: Glorioso V Miranda; October 8, 1961 (age 64) San Fernando, La Union, Philippines
- Spouse: Caroline Miranda
- Children: Charmaine Anne; Christine Andrea; Glen Carlo; Guian Christopher
- Education: Philippine Military Academy; National Defense College of the Philippines (MNSA)
- Awards: Distinguished Conduct Star; Distinguished Service Star; Gold Cross Medal; Bronze Cross Medal; Military Merit Medal; Military Commendation Medal

Military service
- Allegiance: Philippines
- Branch/service: Philippine Army
- Years of service: 1983–2017
- Rank: Lieutenant General
- Unit: Commanding General of the Philippine Army; Acting Chief of Staff, AFP; AFP Vice Chief of Staff; Northern Luzon Command; 7ID PA; GHQ & HSC, AFP; AFPCGSC; 1002BDe, 10ID, PA; 25IB, 10ID, PA
- Battles/wars: Communist rebellion in the Philippines; Moro conflict Battle of Marawi

Glorioso Ventura Miranda (born October 8, 1961) is a retired Filipino soldier who is the former Vice Chief of Staff of the Armed Forces of the Philippines. He served as acting Chief of Staff of the Armed Forces of the Philippines from April 22 to June 30, 2016. Before becoming the 46th Vice Chief of Staff of the Armed Forces last March 8, 2016, he was the Commanding General of the AFP Northern Luzon Command from August 13, 2015. He was also the former commander of the 7th Infantry Division. He is part of the Matikas Class of the Philippine Military Academy of 1983.

Following his retirement, he was appointed by President Rodrigo Duterte as a member of the board of directors of the Bases Conversion and Development Authority. He served until 2023 and was succeeded by Rolen Paulino.

== Early life and education ==
Miranda was born in San Fernando, La Union on October 8, 1961. He entered Philippine Military Academy in 1979 and graduated in 1983. He finished Master in Business Administration at Isabela College on April 15, 1992. On January 26, 1996 he finished Project Management Executive Course at Asian Institute of Management in Makati. He obtained his master's degree in National Security Administration at National Defense College of the Philippines on August 31, 2007.

== Military career ==
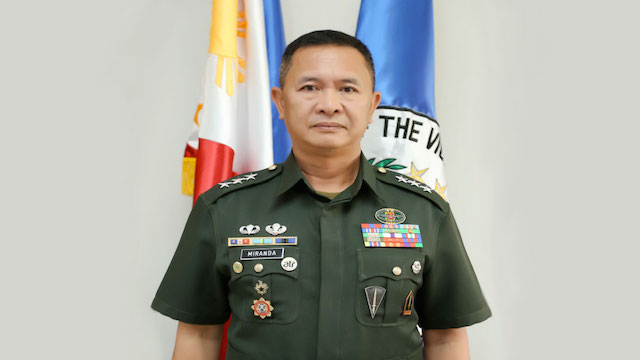
A close-up picture of Lieutenant General Miranda

Miranda became a division commander as he served as the commander of the 7th Infantry Division from April 2, 2014 to August 13, 2015, and was named as a unified command commander as he serves as the commander of the AFP Northern Luzon Command from August 13, 2015 to March 8, 2016. Miranda was named as the Vice Chief of Staff of the Armed Forces of the Philippines, the AFP's second highest position from March 8, 2016 to January 12, 2017. On December 7, 2016, 9 months after being named the Vice Chief of Staff, Lieutenant General Miranda served as the Commanding General of the Philippine Army until October 5, 2017. As the Army's commanding general, he spearheaded the army's modernization programs and created new doctrines within the modern battlefield.

Miranda spent his last weeks in office as the Army's commanding general, he coordinated and finalized the AFP's final offensive within Marawi City and formally retired from military service on October 5, 2017. Miranda was replaced by then-division commander of the 1st Infantry Division Major General Rolando Joselito Bautista.

== Awards ==
Miranda's awards include:

- Philippine Republic Presidential Unit Citation
- People Power I Unit Citation
- People Power II Unit Citation
- Commander, Philippine Legion of Honor
- One Distinguished Conduct Star
- Four Distinguished Service Stars
- Four Gold Cross Medal
- One Bronze Cross Medal
- One Long Service Medals
- Military Commendation Medal
- Military Merit Medal (Philippines)
- Military Civic Action Medal
- Wounded Personnel Medal
- Parangal sa Kapanalig ng Sandatahang Lakas ng Pilipinas
- Anti-dissidence Campaign Medal
- Luzon Anti-Dissidence Campaign Medal
- Visayas Anti-Dissidence Campaign Medal
- Disaster Relief and Rehabilitation Operations Ribbon
- Combat Commander's Badge (Philippines)
- AFP Parachutist Badge
- Scout Ranger Qualification Badge
- National Defense College of the Philippines Seal Badge
- Army Transformation Roadmap Badge
