= Macairog Alberto =

Filipino retired general and diplomat (born 1963)

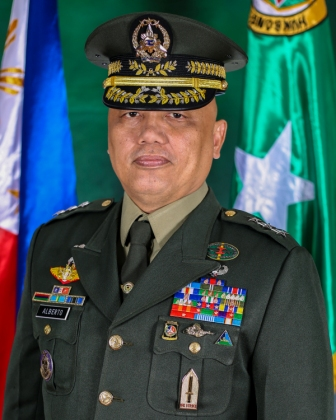
- LtGen. Macairog Alberto in 2018

Philippine Ambassador to Israel
- In office March 12, 2020 – June 30, 2022
- President: Rodrigo Duterte
- Preceded by: Nathaniel G. Imperial
- Succeeded by: Pedro R. Laylo Jr.

Commanding General of the Philippine Army
- In office October 15, 2018 – December 6, 2019
- President: Rodrigo Duterte
- Preceded by: Lt. Gen. Rolando Joselito Bautista
- Succeeded by: Lt. Gen. Gilbert I. Gapay

Personal details
- Born: Macairog Sabiniano Alberto; December 6, 1963 (age 62) Quezon City, Philippines
- Education: Philippine Military Academy

Military service
- Allegiance: Philippines
- Branch/service: Philippine Army
- Years of service: 1986–2019
- Rank: Lieutenant General
- Unit: Commanding General of the Philippine Army; Intelligence Service Armed Forces of the Philippines; Department of Ground Warfare (PMA); 1001 Infantry Brigade, 10 ID; AFP Task Force Davao; Scout Ranger Training School Commandant; 2nd Scout Ranger Battalion, 1st SRR; 3rd Scout Ranger Battalion, 1st SRR; Intelligence Officer of the Battalion Peace Keeping Contingent of the Philippines
- Battles/wars: Moro conflict Communist rebellion in the Philippines; International Force East Timor; Battle of Marawi

Macairog Sabiniano Alberto is a Filipino retired general and diplomat who served as the former Commanding General of the Philippine Army. He is a graduate of the Philippine Military Academy "Sinagtala" Class of 1986.

Alberto's previous commands include the Intelligence Service of the Armed Forces of the Philippines (ISAFP), as well as the 2nd and 3rd Scout Ranger Battalions.

On March 2, 2020, President Rodrigo Duterte appointed Alberto as the new Ambassador to Israel, which he served in until the end of the Duterte presidency in 2022.

== Education ==
Alberto is a graduate of the Philippine Military Academy "Sinagtala" Class of 1986; other training programs he has completed include the Scout Ranger Course, Command and General Staff Course (Second highest in his class), Strategic Intel Course, Counterterrorism Fellowship Program in the US, and Public Management Major in Development and Security at the Development Academy of the Philippines (DAP). Alberto also holds a Master of Arts in Strategic Studies from the National Defense University in Fort Lesley J. McNair, Washington, D.C.

== Military career ==
Lieutenant General Alberto's career started when he served as a Platoon Leader, then a Company Commander at the 2nd Infantry Division (Philippines). Afterwards, Alberto also became a member of the Special Forces as he joined the 1st Scout Ranger Regiment and became a Battalion Commander of two Scout Ranger Battalions; namely the 2nd and 3rd Scout Ranger Battalions, as a lieutenant colonel.

Throughout his career, Alberto was assigned from infantry, intelligence, staff, and special forces positions, and was well-respected among his peers and subordinates. Alberto also served as an intelligence officer for the Philippine Contingent in East Timor from 1999–2000. Alberto also headed the Department of Ground Warfare at the Philippine Military Academy, and served as Commandant of the Scout Ranger Training School.

Alberto became the 9th commander of Task Force Davao in June 2014 and became the brigade commander of the 1001 Infantry Brigade of the 10th Infantry Division. Alberto was later appointed as the chief of the Intelligence Service, Armed Forces of the Philippines (ISAFP), in August 2017. As the commander of the ISAFP, he launched intelligence operations against the New People's Army communist groups, and the Maute group-Abu Sayyaf terrorist groups. Alberto also led intelligence operations throughout the Battle of Marawi against the terrorist's commanders Omar Maute, Abdullah Maute, and Isnilon Hapilon.

Alberto was appointed as the commanding general of the Philippine Army on October 15, 2018, where he earned his third star and was promoted to lieutenant general. As the Army's commanding general, he continued initiating reforms by his predecessors, and crafted new doctrines and strategies in engaging both internal and external defense operations, as part of the lessons made during the Marawi Siege. Alberto also oversaw the army's upgraded aviation arm, the Army Aviation Regiment, and also supervised the army's newly created new units as part of the army's modernization programs, such as the 11th Infantry Division, the 1st Brigade Combat Team, and new artillery battery units, namely the 1st Multiple Launch Rocket System Battery, the 2nd Multiple Launch Rocket System Battery, 1st Land-based Missile System Battery, 1st Field Artillery (155mm Self Propelled) Battery, and the 2nd Field Artillery (155mm Self Propelled) Battery, which gave the army time to train, adapt and create measures in preparation of the acquisition of the army's new assets. Alberto retired from military service on December 6, 2019 and was replaced by then-unified command commander of the AFP Southern Luzon Command, Lieutenant General Gilbert I. Gapay.

== Awards ==
- Philippine Republic Presidential Unit Citation
- Martial Law Unit Citation
- People Power I Unit Citation
- People Power II Unit Citation
- Philippine Legion of Honor
- Distinguished Service Star
- Gold Cross Medals
- Silver Cross Medals
- Distinguished Service Medal
- Gawad sa Kapayapaan
- Bronze Cross Medals
- Military Merit
- Military Civic Action Medal
- Military Commendation Medal
- Silver Wing Medal
- United Nations Service Medal
- Long Service Medal
- Anti-dissidence Campaign Medal
- Luzon Anti-Dissidence Campaign Medal
- Visayas Anti-Dissidence Campaign Medal
- Mindanao Anti-Dissidence Campaign Medal
- Disaster Relief and Rehabilitation Operations Ribbon
- Kapanalig ng Sandatahang Lakas ng Pilipinas
- Combat Commander's Badge (Philippines)
- Scout Ranger Qualification Badge
- Honorary Airborne Wings - From The Royal Thai Army
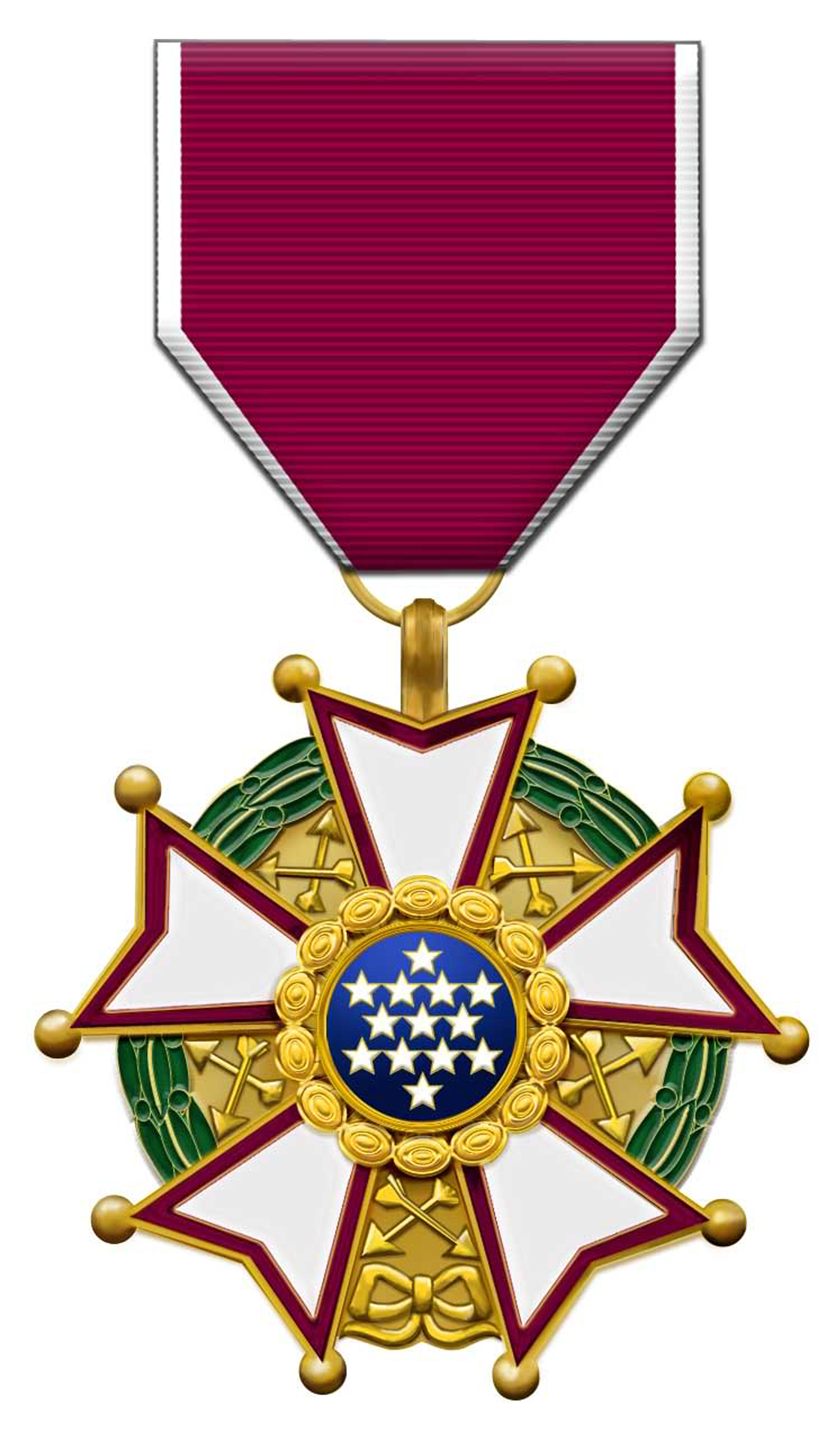
- Legion of Merit

== Personal life ==
Alberto is married to Jessica O. Alberto; they have four children - two sons and two daughters. His son, Captain Marky John O. Alberto, a graduate of Philippine Army Officer Candidate Course “KASIKLAB” Class 53-2020, was killed in an encounter with New People’s Army (NPA) rebels in Baco, Oriental Mindoro on August 12, 2025.
