= Benito T. de Leon =

Retired military officer

Benito T. de León
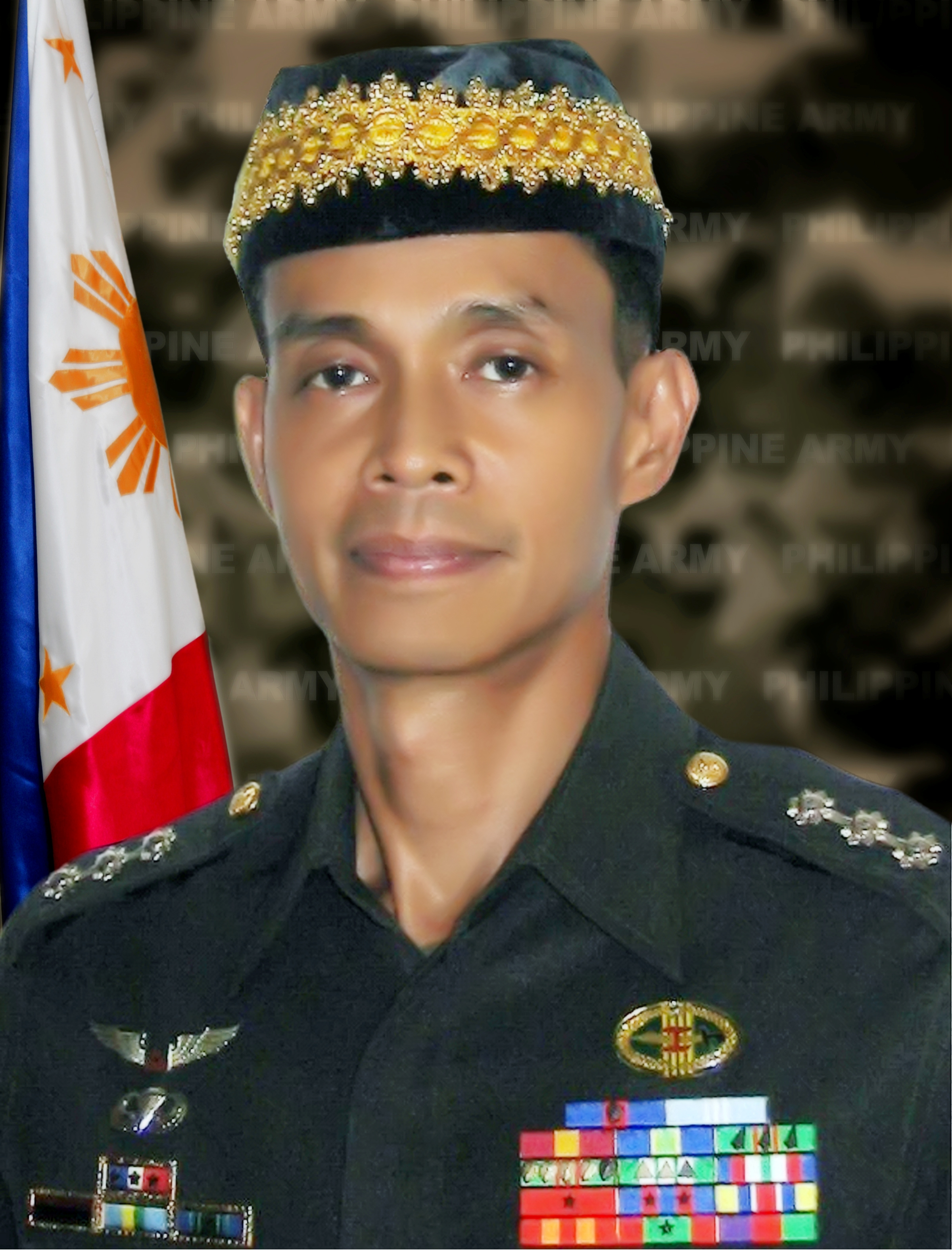
- In army bush coat uniform wearing a Maranao Sultan cap (October 2008)
- Born: March 21, 1960 (age 66); Tuguegarao, Cagayan, Philippines
- Military career
- Allegiance: Philippines
- Branch: Philippine Army
- Service years: 1981 – 2016
- Rank: Major General
- Nickname: Bennie
- Unit: 1st Infantry (Tabak) Division
- Commands: 104th Infantry (Sultan) Brigade, 1st Infantry Division; Joint Task Force GENSAN, 10th Infantry Division; 58th Infantry (Dimalulupig) Battalion, 4th Infantry Division

Benito Antonio Templo de León (born March 21, 1960) is a retired military officer of the Armed Forces of the Philippines (AFP). While a Roman Catholic, he was conferred the rare Muslim-Maranao honorary title of Sultan a Romapunut for his peace efforts. De León held the Philippine Army rank of major general and was the commander of the 5th Infantry Division until his designation as Inspector General of the Armed Forces of the Philippines. He retired in 2016 after reaching the mandatory age of 56.

== Background ==
Benito de León was born on March 21, 1960, in Tuguegarao, Cagayan. His father, Nicolás de León (1936–2010) from Alcala, Cagayan, was a Certified Public Accountant who later taught in colleges and eventually retired as a banker. His mother, Fe Templo-de León (1929–1981), from Santo Niño, Cagayan, was a public school teacher. His three maternal uncles graduated from the Philippine Military Academy, and served in the military until retirement as general or flag officers: Brigadier General César Templo, Class of 1954; Commodore George Templo, Class of 1957; and Brigadier General Emiliano Templo, Class of 1962.

De León is the eldest from a Catholic family of seven including his brother Superintendent Valeriano de León (also a graduate of the Philippine Military Academy, Class of 1989), who is serving with the Philippine National Police.

He is married to the Annabelle Quinonez from Surigao del Sur, with whom he has four children: Antoinette, Dyanne Lysette, Michael Henry, and Patrick Kevin. His first grandson is Michael Anthony.

== Education ==
He took his early elementary education at Saint Paul College of Tuguegarao and finished at Tuguegarao North Central School. He had his secondary education at Saint Louis Science High School of Tuguegarao and graduated in 1977. Thereafter, he entered the Philippine Military Academy as cadet and graduated with the Dimalupig Class of 1981. He took his Basic Infantry Course at the United States Army Infantry School at Fort Benning in 1987. In 2001, he topped the Philippine Army Command and General Staff Course. In 2004, he finished his Defence and Strategic Studies Course at the Centre for Defence and Strategic Studies of the Australian Defence College.

De León also holds a Master in Management degree from the Asian Institute of Management, a Master of Business Administration from the National College of Business and Arts, and Master of Arts in Strategic Studies from Deakin University in Australia. He also finished the Freelance Writer Program through distance learning with the Penn Foster Career School in the United States.

== Military career ==
=== Junior years ===
De León’s early years in the services were with the 12th Infantry Battalion, 3rd Infantry Division posted as a company grade officer in Mindanao, particularly in Lanao del Norte and Lanao del Sur, addressing the separatist movement—the Moro National Liberation Front. His unit was eventually redeployed to Panay Island in the Visayas to deal with the insurgents—the New People's Army. After a study tour in the United States, he was assigned to teach at the Training and Doctrine Command of the Philippine Army. Much later, he took on junior staff assignments in the Army General Staff and then at the AFP General Headquarters primarily in the fields of Comptrollership.

=== Senior years ===
Later, he led the 58th Infantry (Dimalulupig) Battalion under the 4th Infantry Division in Mindanao at the height of the Moro Islamic Liberation Front (MILF) hostilities in 2000 and was awarded the Gold Cross Medal for gallantry in action. At that time, he was also conferred the Maranao honorary title of Sultan a Romapunut (“Leader of Peace”) in Lumbayanague, Lanao del Sur by local Muslims for his peace efforts.

After graduating and topping his class in the Command and General Staff Course, he was made to serve as Head of the Strategy, Warfare and Conflict Studies Department of the Army Command and Staff College; later, he joined the faculty of the AFP Command and General Staff College. His senior staff assignments include as the Executive Assistants to the AFP Chief of Staff and afterward to the Deputy Chief of Staff; as the Military Assistant to the Assistant Secretary for Finance at the Department of National Defense; as President of a General Court Martial; and, as the first Chief of Staff and Spokesperson of 10th Infantry (Agila) Division.

He has also served as Commander of Joint Task Force General Santos (GENSAN) confronting terrorist threats in the area. He served as the Commander of 104th Infantry (Sultan) Brigade based in Iligan City and covering Lanao del Norte. His unit was tasked to pursue the lawless group of the Moro Islamic Liberation Front which pillaged the coastal towns of Kolambugan and Kauswagan; bringing stability into the long troubled region of the Philippines caused by a Muslim separatist movement. As De León pursued the outlaws, he had continuously sought support of the different sectors of society to bring in developmental projects, and heavily engaged in interfaith consultations and dialogues to create harmony between Christians and Muslims.
