= Ricardo Visaya =

Filipino government official

General Ricardo R. Visaya AFP
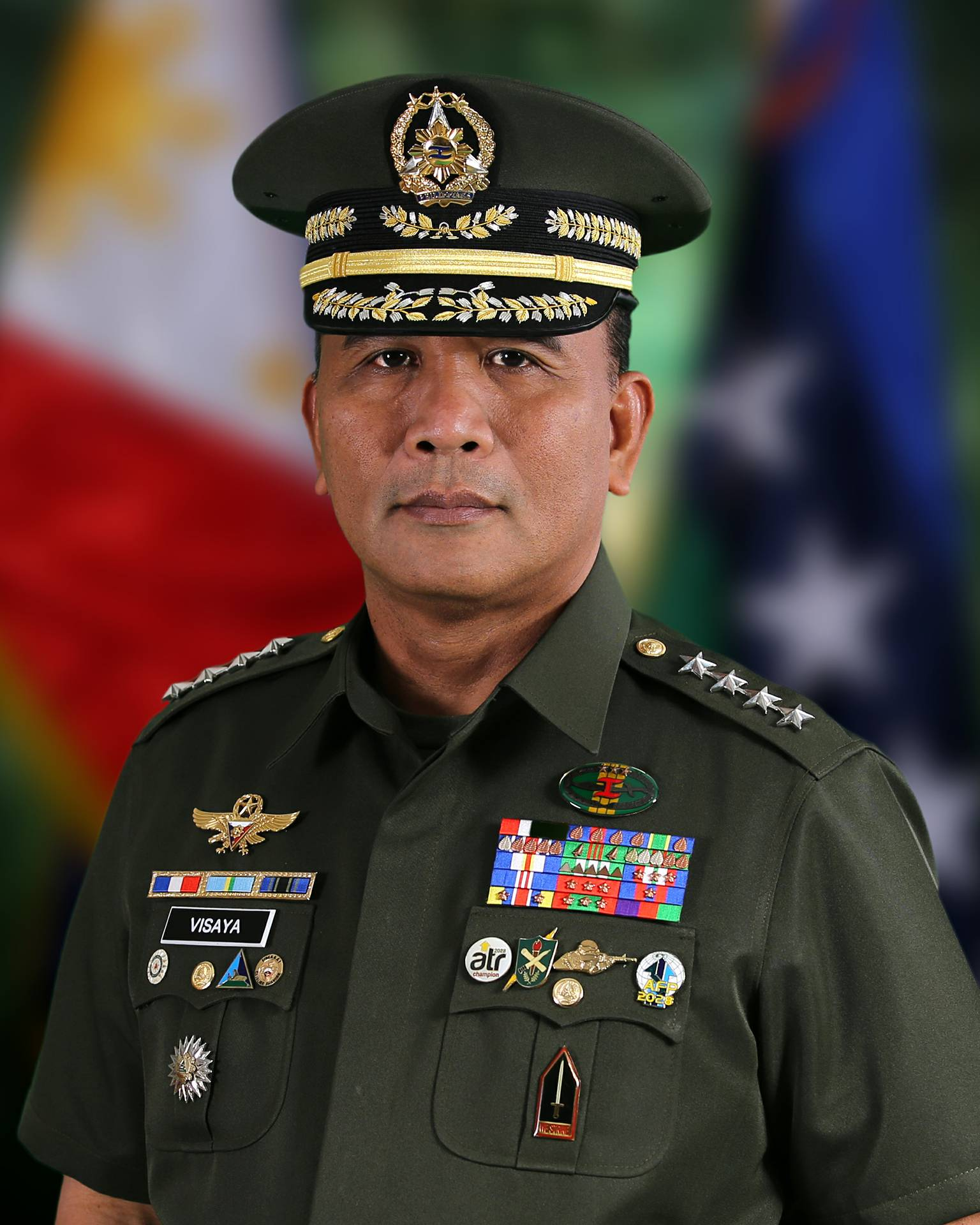

Administrator of the National Irrigation Administration
- In office March 7, 2017 – July 23, 2022
- President: Rodrigo Duterte; Bongbong Marcos
- Preceded by: Peter T. Laviña
- Succeeded by: Benny D. Antiporda

47th Chief of Staff of the Armed Forces of the Philippines
- In office July 1, 2016 – December 7, 2016
- President: Rodrigo Duterte
- Preceded by: Lt. Gen. Glorioso Miranda (acting)
- Succeeded by: Gen. Eduardo Año

Commanding General of AFP Southern Luzon Command
- In office September 8, 2014 – July 1, 2016

Commander of 4th Infantry Division, PA
- In office April 25, 2013 – September 8, 2014

Personal details
- Born: Ricardo Ramoran Visaya; December 8, 1960 (age 65) Bacarra, Ilocos Norte, Philippines
- Education: Philippine Military Academy
- Awards: Distinguished Service Star; Gawad sa Kaunlaran; Bronze Cross Medal; Military Merit Medal; Silver Wing Medal; Military Commendation Medal; Sagisag ng Ulirang Kawal

Military service
- Allegiance: Philippines
- Branch/service: Philippine Army
- Years of service: 1983–2016
- Rank: General
- Unit: Chief of Staff, AFP; Southern Luzon Command; 6ID PA; 4ID PA; 69IB, 6ID, PA; 104IB, 1ID, PA; 901IB, 9ID, PA
- Battles/wars: Communist rebellion in the Philippines; Moro conflict Philippine drug war

Ricardo Ramoran Visaya (born December 8, 1960) is a retired Philippine Army general serving as the administrator of the National Irrigation Administration (NIA) since 2017. He was the 47th Chief of Staff of the Armed Forces of the Philippines from July to December 2016. He had also previously served as the commanding general of the AFP Southern Luzon Command, assistant division commander of the 6th Infantry Division, and commander of the 4th Infantry Division. He is from the class of 1983 (Matikas) of the Philippine Military Academy.

On March 7, 2017, Visaya was appointed as National Irrigation Administration chief after Peter T. Laviña resign from his post a week prior.

== Early life and education ==
Ricardo Visaya was born in Bacarra, Ilocos Norte. It's also where he finished elementary and secondary education. He entered Philippine Military Academy in 1979 and graduated in 1983.

== Military career ==
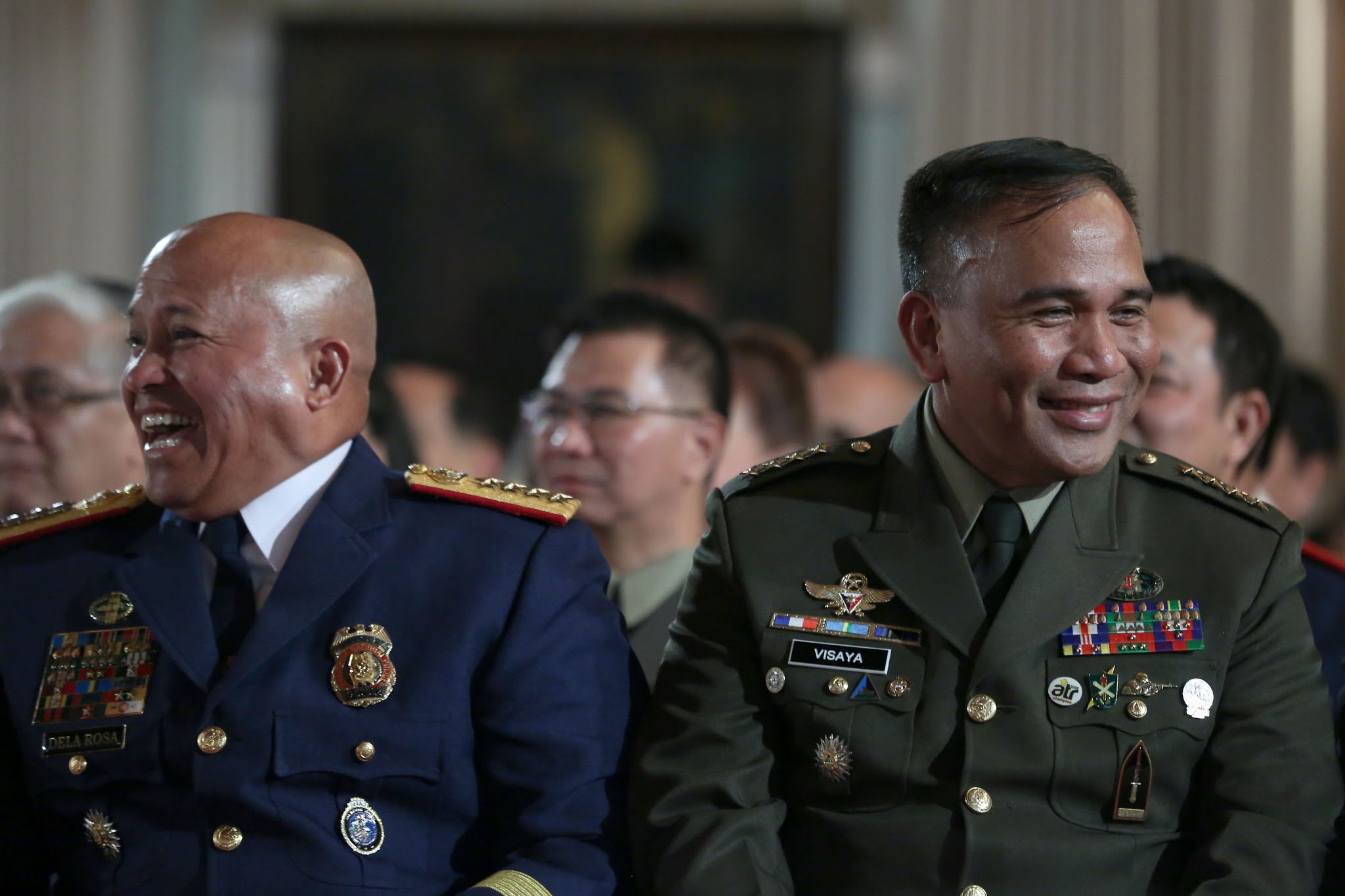
General Visaya with PNP Chief Ronald dela Rosa sharing a light moment.

After graduating in 1983, he led various units in the Philippine Army and the AFP, such as the 901st Infantry Battalion of the 9th Infantry Division, the 104th Infantry Brigade of the 1st Infantry Division and the 69th Infantry Brigade of the 6th Infantry Division.

He also led the 4th Infantry Division the 6th Infantry Division, and the AFP Southern Luzon Command, before being appointed as the Chief of Staff of the Armed Forces of the Philippines on July 1, 2016. He retired from military service on December 7, 2016.

=== Training ===
He attended various courses locally and abroad, such as the Scout Ranger Regular Course, the Intelligence Officer Basic Course, the Infantry Basic Course, the Infantry Officer Advance Course, the Tradecraft for Trainor's Course, the Electronic Warfare Officer Course, the Contract Management Course, the Executive Course on Security Studies in Hawaii, USA; the Command General Staff Course at the Training and Doctrine Command, Philippine Army; the Pacific Army Management Seminar in Tokyo, Japan; the Professional Managers Program at the Ateneo de Manila University; and the Financial Statement Analysis program at the University of Asia and the Pacific. He earned his master's degree in Project Management at the Australian Defence College in Canberra, Australia.

=== Awards ===
Visaya's awards include:

- Philippine Legion of Honor
- People Power I Unit Citation
- People Power II Unit Citation
- Philippine Republic Presidential Unit Citation
- Three (3) Gawad sa Kaunlaran
- Eleven (11) Bronze Cross Medals
- Forty Nine (49) Military Merit Medal (Philippines)
- Fourteen (14) Military Commendation Medals
- Sagisag ng Ulirang Kawal
- Two (2) Silver Wing Medals
- 20 Plaques of Recognitions
- PMA Cavalier Award (as outstanding alumnus of the Philippine Military Academy)
- Bronze Cross Medal
- Distinguished Service Star
- Gawad sa Kaunlaran
- Sagisag ng Ulirang Kawal
- Combat Commander's Badge (Philippines)
- Scout Ranger Qualification Badge
- Philippine Army Command and General Staff Course Badge
