= 104th Infantry Brigade (Philippines) =

- Emblem of the 104th IBde
- Active: October 26, 2000 - Present
- Country: Philippines
- Branch: Philippine Army
- Type: Infantry
- Role: Conventional Warfare, Anti-Guerrilla Operations
- Size: 2 to 4 maneuver Battalions.
- Part of: Under the 1st Infantry Division
- Garrison/HQ: Barangay Maria Cristina, Iligan City
- Nickname(s): Sultan Brigade
- Motto(s): The just ... the brave
- Anniversaries: October 26
- Engagements: Operation Enduring Freedom - Philippines; Anti-guerilla operations against the NPA and the Moro Islamic Liberation Front

Commanders
- Current commander: Col Gerardo F Barrientos
- Notable commanders: BGen Romeo Tolentino; BGen Nehemias Pajarito

The 104th Infantry Brigade, 1st Infantry Division, Philippine Army, known officially as the Sultan Brigade, is one of the brigades of the Philippine Army which is organic to its 1st Infantry Division. It is an infantry unit, and specializes in anti-guerrilla warfare.

== History ==
The 104th Infantry Brigade was originally the Task Force “Sultan” activated on 5 April 2000 at Camp General Teodolfo Bautista, Bus-bus, Jolo, Sulu to confront the threat posed by the terrorist Abu Sayaff group in Sulu and Tawi-tawi Provinces. The Task Force was eventually reconstituted on 26 October 2000 and renamed as the 104th Infantry “Sultan” Brigade under the 1st Infantry Division of the Philippine Army pursuant to Section II, General Order Number 1195 of Headquarters Philippine Army dated 25 October 2000. The task was for the brigade to confront the Abu Sayyaf group which was engaged in kidnap for ransom activities. It stayed in the area until January 2008 when it was given a new area—Lanao del Norte primarily to help contain the MILF group in the province. In the aftermath of the August 2008 atrocities perpetrated by a group of the MILF who were eventually outlawed, its units featured significantly in the restoration of stability in Lanao del Norte. On 22 December 2009, the brigade headquarters swapped with 601 Infantry Brigade in Tacurong City and assumed command and control over units deployed in the Provinces of Maguindanao and Sultan Kudarat: a State of Emergency exist in these places to curb the violence and lawlessness attributed to political competition. The brigade was then tasked to assist the police restore order and civil governance.

=== Mission ===
The 104th Infantry (Sultan) Brigade conducts Internal Security Operations (ISO) in the assigned area of responsibility (AOR) of the 1st Infantry Division in Western Mindanao to dismantle and destroy the remaining guerilla fronts of the Local Communist Movement (LCM), hold and contain the Moro Islamic Liberation Front (MILF), and destroy the Abu Sayyaf Group in order to attain peace and stability conducive to sustainable development in assisting the Philippine government in its socio-economic development projects; and assists the Philippine National Police curb criminalities in the area.

=== Lineage of Commanding Officers ===
- BGen Romeo P Tolentino AFP (5 April 2000 - 21 September 2002)
- BGen Alexander D Aleo AFP (21 September 2002 - 22 July 2003)
- BGen Alexander U Yapching AFP (22 July 2003 - 28 March 2004)
- BGen Nehemias G Pajarito AFP (28 March 2004 - 25 April 2006)
- BGen Reynaldo D Sealana AFP (25 April 2006 - 10 January 2007)
- BGen Antonio I Supnet AFP (10 January 2007 - 9 September 2008)
- Col Benito T de Leon PA (9 September 2008 – 5 January 2010)
- Col Ricardo R Visaya PA - (February 2011 – 30 May 2012)

== Units ==
The following are the Infantry Battalion units that are presently placed under operational control of the 104th Infantry Brigade.

- 8th Infantry (Dependable) Battalion of 4th Infantry Division
- 10th Infantry (Steady...On) Battalion
- 32nd Infantry (Daredevil) Battalion
- 35th Infantry (Makamandag) Battalion
- 43rd Infantry (We Search) Battalion of 8th Infantry Division

== Operations ==
- Anti-guerrilla operations against the New People's Army and the Moro National Liberation Front (MNLF). After a peace agreement was concluded between Philippine and MNLF officials, the brigade fought against the Moro Islamic Liberation Front (MILF).
- Anti-terrorist operations against the Abu Sayyaf.
- Operation Enduring Freedom - Philippines.

== Trivia ==
- BGen Romeo P Tolentino AFP rose to become the Commanding General of the Philippine Army and retiring in that position with the rank of a Lieutenant General.
- BGen Nehemias G Pajarito AFP was awarded a Distinguished Conduct Star during his tenure as the Commander of 104th Infantry Brigade for his gallantry in action in leading his unit against the Abu Sayaff. A rare occasion for a brigade commander to lead the troops in the front line and be awarded for such feat. He eventually commanded the 1st Infantry Division until his retirement holding a rank of a Major General.
