= National Security Council (Philippines) =

Advisory body to the president of the Philippines

- Sanggunian sa Pambansang Seguridad
- Official Seal

Agency overview
- Formed: July 1, 1950; 76 years ago
- Preceding agency: Council of National Defense
- Jurisdiction: Philippines
- Headquarters: Malacañang Palace, Manila, Philippines
- Motto: Kaunlaran, Katatagan, Kapayapaan ("Development, Stability, Peace")
- Employees: 104 (2024)
- Agency executives: H.E. Pres. Bongbong Marcos, Chairman; Sec. Eduardo SL Oban Jr., National Security Adviser and Director-General; Usec. Benjamin R. Madrigal Jr., Chief of Staff and Deputy Director General
- Parent agency: Office of the President of the Philippines
- Website: National Security Council of the Philippines

The National Security Council (NSC; Filipino: Sanggunian sa Pambansang Seguridad) is the principal forum of the president of the Philippines considering national security and foreign policy matters with his senior national security advisors and cabinet officials.

The NSC consists of two distinct bodies – the Council Proper and the Secretariat.

The Council Proper is a collegial body chaired by the President. It includes concerned officials of the Cabinet and Congress, as members, as well as other government officials and private citizens who may be invited by the president.

The Council was created during the administration of President Elpidio Quirino through Executive Order (EO) No. 330, dated July 1, 1950. It was reorganized by virtue of EO No. 115, series of 1986.

The NSC Secretariat is a permanent body that provides technical support to the council proper. It is headed by the Director-General, who is also appointed as the National Security Adviser.

== History ==
Commonwealth Act No. 1 is the original policy basis of the national security program of the Republic of the Philippines. That act mandated the establishment of a Council of National Defense to advise the President on all matters of national defense policy. This council's membership previously consists of the President, all living former Presidents, the Vice President, the head of each executive department, the Chief of Staff, and six other members to be designated by the President.

Subsequent to World War II, which included a period during which the Commonwealth government operated as a government in exile, and subsequent to the recognition of the Republic of the Philippines as a sovereign nation, President Elpidio Quirino established the NSC as a body so named.

The 1987 Constitution mandates civilian control of the military and establishes the President as Commander in Chief of the Armed Forces of the Philippines. The President also heads the NSC, ostensibly the policy-making and advisory body for matters connected with national defense. Former President Corazon Aquino reestablished the NSC in 1986 through an executive order that provided for a NSC Director to advise the President on national security matters and for a NSC Secretariat. The Council itself is composed of the President and at least nine others: the Vice President; the AFP chief of staff; NSC Director; the Executive Secretary; and the Secretaries of Foreign Affairs, National Defense, Interior and Local Government, Justice, and Labor and Employment (called ministers before 1987). By the end of 1990, however, the NSC had only convened twice.

Responsibility for national security was vested in the Department of National Defense. The principal functions of the department in 1991 were to defend the state against internal and external threats and, through the Philippine National Police, to maintain law and order. The Secretary of National Defense, by law a civilian, was charged with advising the president on defense matters and developing defense policy.

In 2002, President Gloria Macapagal Arroyo won support from her Cabinet and the Congress for the deployment of American soldiers in the Philippines as part of the war on terrorism. She convened a meeting of the NSC to pull wavering officials - including her Vice President, Teofisto Guingona Jr. - into line and smooth over differences in her administration over the issue. Arroyo insisted her oppositions to marshal support for her stance to back a United States-led campaign against terrorism, not only to implement a unanimous UN Security Council resolution calling on UN members to bring the perpetrators to justice but also the Philippines' strategic alliance with the US and to assist the global campaign to end the scourge of terrorism.

In 2016, the President Rodrigo Duterte convened the NSC and discussed his major initiatives: the war on illegal drugs, peace talks with communist and Moro rebels, and the territorial disputes with China.

In January 2025, President Bongbong Marcos issued Executive Order No. 81 effectively removing the Vice President, as well as past presidents of the Philippines from the council.

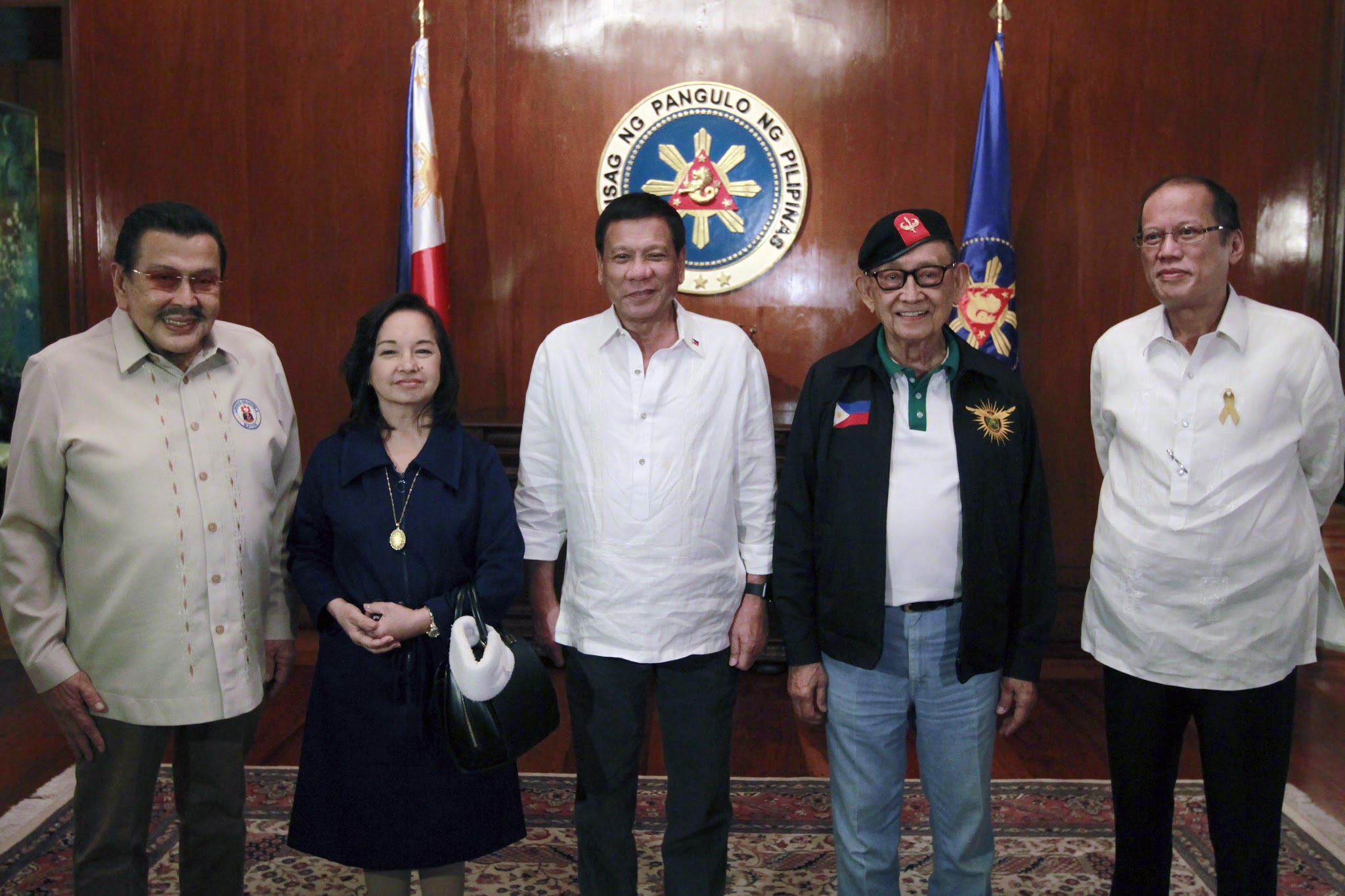
Then President Rodrigo Duterte (center) with (from left) former presidents Joseph Estrada, Gloria Macapagal Arroyo, Fidel V. Ramos, and Benigno Aquino III, before the start of a National Security Council meeting at Malacañang Palace on July 27, 2016 Credit: Rey Baniquet (Presidential Communications Operations Office, Office of the President)

The National Security Advisor and Director-General serve as Chief of Staff and adviser for Special Concerns in National Security to the President. The NSA has a rank of Secretary in the government. The current Director-General and National Security Adviser is Secretary Eduardo Año.

== Functions ==
The NSC's function is to advise the President with respect to the integration of domestic, foreign, and military policies relating to national security. It also serves as the President's principal arm for coordinating these policies among various government departments and agencies in matters involving national security.

== Composition ==
As provided in the Administrative Code of 1987, the NSC is composed of the President as chairman, the Vice President, the Secretary of Foreign Affairs, the Executive Secretary, the Secretary of National Defense, the Secretary of Justice, the Secretary of Labor and Employment, the Secretary of Local Governments, the National Security Director, the Chief of Staff of the Armed Forces of the Philippines (AFP), and such other government officials and private individuals as the President may appoint.

In 1992, President Fidel Ramos reorganized the NSC to include the Secretaries of Science and Technology, Trade and Industry, Finance, and Environment and Natural Resources, and the Director-General of the National Economic and Development Authority.

In 2001, President Gloria Macapagal Arroyo amended Ramos' Executive Order and reconstituted the NSC to its present form. In 2024, President Bongbong Marcos revised the composition of the NSC by excluding the Vice President and former presidents.

=== Council ===
As of October 12, 2026, the members are as follows:

Class	Office	Current members
Ex officio: Executive	President	Bongbong Marcos
Ex officio: Executive	Executive Secretary	Ralph Recto (Ad interim)
Ex officio: Executive	National Security Adviser	Eduardo Oban
Ex officio: Executive	Secretary of Foreign Affairs	Tess Lazaro
Ex officio: Executive	Secretary of Justice	Fredderick Vida (Acting)
Ex officio: Executive	Secretary of National Defense	Gilbert Teodoro
Ex officio: Executive	Secretary of the Interior and Local Government	Jonvic Remulla
Ex officio: Executive	Secretary of Labor and Employment	Francis Tolentino (Acting)
Ex officio: Executive	Chief Presidential Legal Counsel	Anna Liza Logan
Ex officio: Executive	Secretary of the Presidential Communications Office	Lino Cayetano (Ad interim)
Ex officio: Senate	President	Sherwin Gatchalian
Ex officio: Senate	President pro tempore	Tito Sotto
Ex officio: Senate	Majority Floor Leader	Juan Miguel Zubiri
Ex officio: Senate	Minority Floor Leader	Alan Peter Cayetano
Ex officio: Senate	Chairperson, Senate Committee on Foreign Relations	Juan Miguel Zubiri
Ex officio: Senate	Chairperson, Senate Committee on National Defense and Security	Tito Sotto
Ex officio: Senate	Chairperson, Senate Committee on Public Order and Dangerous Drugs	Panfilo Lacson
Ex officio: House of Representatives	Speaker	Bojie Dy
Ex officio: House of Representatives	Deputy Speaker	List of Deputy Speakers
Ex officio: House of Representatives	Majority Floor Leader	Sandro Marcos
Ex officio: House of Representatives	Minority Floor Leader	Marcelino Libanan
Ex officio: House of Representatives	Chairperson, House Committee on Foreign Affairs	Maria Rachel Arenas
Ex officio: House of Representatives	Chairperson, House Committee on National Defense and Security	Oscar Malapitan
Ex officio: House of Representatives	Chairperson, House Committee on Public Order and Safety	Rolan Valeriano

=== NSC Executive Committee ===
The NSC Executive Committee (EXECOM) reviews national security and defense problems and formulates positions or solutions for consideration by the council. It determines the Council's agenda and order of business and ensures that decisions of the Council are clearly communicated to the agencies concerned. It advises the President on the implementation of decisions. As of October 2026, the EXECOM's members are:

Position	Office	Current members
Chairperson	President	Bongbong Marcos
Members
Members	Senate President	Sherwin Gatchalian
Members	House Speaker	Bojie Dy
Members	Executive Secretary	Ralph Recto
Members	National Security Adviser	Eduardo Oban
Members	Secretary of Foreign Affairs	Tess Lazaro
Members	Secretary of Justice	Fredderick Vida (Acting)
Members	Secretary of National Defense	Gilbert Teodoro
Members	Secretary of the Interior and Local Government	Jonvic Remulla
Members	Secretary of the Presidential Communications Office	Lino Cayetano (Ad interim)

== List of national security advisers ==
Portrait	Name	Term start	Term end	Duration	President
	Emanuel V. Soriano (1936–2023)	February 1, 1987	February 15, 1989	2 years, 14 days	Corazon Aquino
Office vacant from February 15 to February 17, 1989					Corazon Aquino
	Rafael Ileto (1920–2003)	February 17, 1989	June 30, 1992	3 years, 134 days	Corazon Aquino
	Jose T. Almonte (born 1941)	July 1, 1992	June 30, 1998	5 years, 364 days	Fidel V. Ramos
	Alexander Aguirre	July 1, 1998	January 19, 2001	2 years, 202 days	Joseph Estrada
Office vacant from January 19 to February 19, 2001					Joseph Estrada
Office vacant from January 19 to February 19, 2001					Gloria Macapagal Arroyo
	Roilo Golez (1947–2018)	February 19, 2001	January 4, 2004	2 years, 319 days	Gloria Macapagal Arroyo
Office vacant from January 4 to February 11, 2004					Gloria Macapagal Arroyo
	Norberto Gonzales (born 1947)	February 11, 2004	August 31, 2004	202 days	Gloria Macapagal Arroyo
	Jun Ebdane (born 1948)	August 22, 2004	February 14, 2005	176 days	Gloria Macapagal Arroyo
	Norberto Gonzales (born 1947)	February 15, 2005	December 22, 2009	4 years, 310 days	Gloria Macapagal Arroyo
	Milo Ibrado Jr.	December 23, 2009	June 30, 2010	189 days	Gloria Macapagal Arroyo
Office vacant from June 30 to July 5, 2010					Benigno Aquino III
	Cesar Garcia Jr.	July 5, 2010	June 30, 2016	5 years, 361 days	Benigno Aquino III
	Hermogenes Esperon Jr. (born 1952)	July 1, 2016	June 30, 2022	5 years, 364 days	Rodrigo Duterte
	Clarita Carlos (born 1946)	July 1, 2022	January 14, 2023	198 days	Bongbong Marcos
	Eduardo Año (born 1961)	January 14, 2023	April 15, 2026	3 years, 91 days	Bongbong Marcos
	Eduardo Oban (born 1955)	April 15, 2026	Incumbent	211 days	Bongbong Marcos

== See also ==
- Department of National Defense (Philippines)
- National Intelligence Coordinating Agency
- Council of State
