= Clarita Carlos =

Filipina political scientist and academic

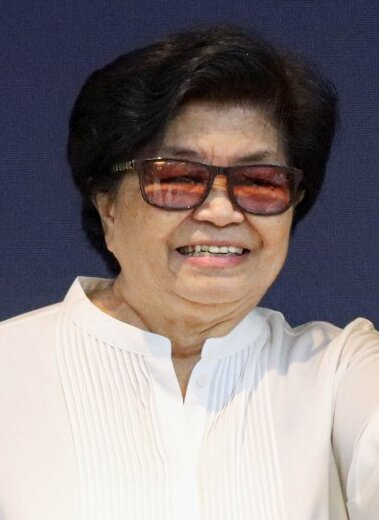
- Carlos in 2022

National Security Adviser Ad interim
- In office June 30, 2022 – January 14, 2023
- President: Bongbong Marcos
- Preceded by: Hermogenes Esperon
- Succeeded by: Eduardo Año

16th President of the National Defense College of the Philippines
- In office August 17, 1998 – October 15, 2001
- Preceded by: Eduardo T. Cabanlig
- Succeeded by: Carlos L. Agustin

Personal details
- Born: June 24, 1946 (age 80)
- Education: University of the Philippines Diliman (BS, MA, PhD)

Academic background
- Thesis: Motives of Public Officials at a Distance: A Case Study of Two Philippine Presidents (President Ramon Magsaysay and President Ferdinand Marcos) (1982)

Academic work
- Discipline: Political Science
- Institutions: University of the Philippines Diliman

Clarita Reyes Carlos (born June 24, 1946) is a Filipino political scientist and commentator, academic, and educator who last served as the National Security Adviser under the administration of President Bongbong Marcos from 2022 to 2023. As National Security Adviser, she concurrently served as the Director-General of the National Security Council and Vice Chairperson of the Anti-Terrorism Council. She served as the 16th President of the National Defense College of the Philippines from 1998 to 2001, becoming the first female and first civilian to lead the institution.

She is a retired professor of political science at the University of the Philippines Diliman.

== Education ==
Carlos attended Bonifacio Memorial Elementary School for grade school and La Consolacion College for high school. She earned her bachelor's degree in foreign service from the University of the Philippines Diliman, where she also obtained her master's and doctorate degrees in political science. Her doctoral dissertation focuses on the political motives behind the policymaking of Philippine presidents Ramon Magsaysay and Ferdinand Marcos.

She pursued post-doctoral studies on political psychology at Cornell University and comparative foreign policy analysis at the University of California at Los Angeles as a Fulbright Visiting Fellow.

== Career ==
A staunch advocate of political reform, Carlos is a political commentator and resource person on various issues ranging from domestic and global politics, political dynamics, geopolitics, international relations, defense and security, and foreign policy. She has written numerous books on democratic deficits, bureaucratic and electoral reforms, political parties, and population ageing.

=== Academe ===
Carlos started her career teaching political science, international relations, and environment at the Department of Political Science, University of the Philippines Diliman, in 1967 at the age of 20. During her tenure, she held numerous professorial chairs, namely: Elpidio Quirino Professorial Chair in International Relations, Maximo Kalaw Professorial Chair on Peace and Environment, and the College of Arts and Sciences Alumni Association Professorial Chair. She retired in June 2011 as a full professor of political science having taught at the university for a total of 44 years.

She also taught European studies at Ateneo de Manila University and geopolitics at San Beda University Graduate School of Law. She is a Member-at-Large of the National Research Council of the Philippines.

=== Government ===
==== National Defense College of the Philippines ====
Carlos served as the first female and first civilian president of the National Defense College of the Philippines from August 17, 1998, to October 15, 2001. During her presidency, she improved the institution's organizational structure and introduced new academic modules. She also initiated the Strategic Studies Group, a regular forum for military generals, scientists, government officials, and diplomats, to discuss the broadest range of national security issues in the Philippines.

==== Metropolitan Manila Development Authority and Commission of Higher Education ====
During the presidency of Benigno Aquino III, Carlos served as the head of Office of Strategic and Special Concerns of the Metropolitan Manila Development Authority. In 2020, Carlos was among the appointees of the Commission of Higher Education in its Technical Panel for Political Science.

==== National Security Adviser ====
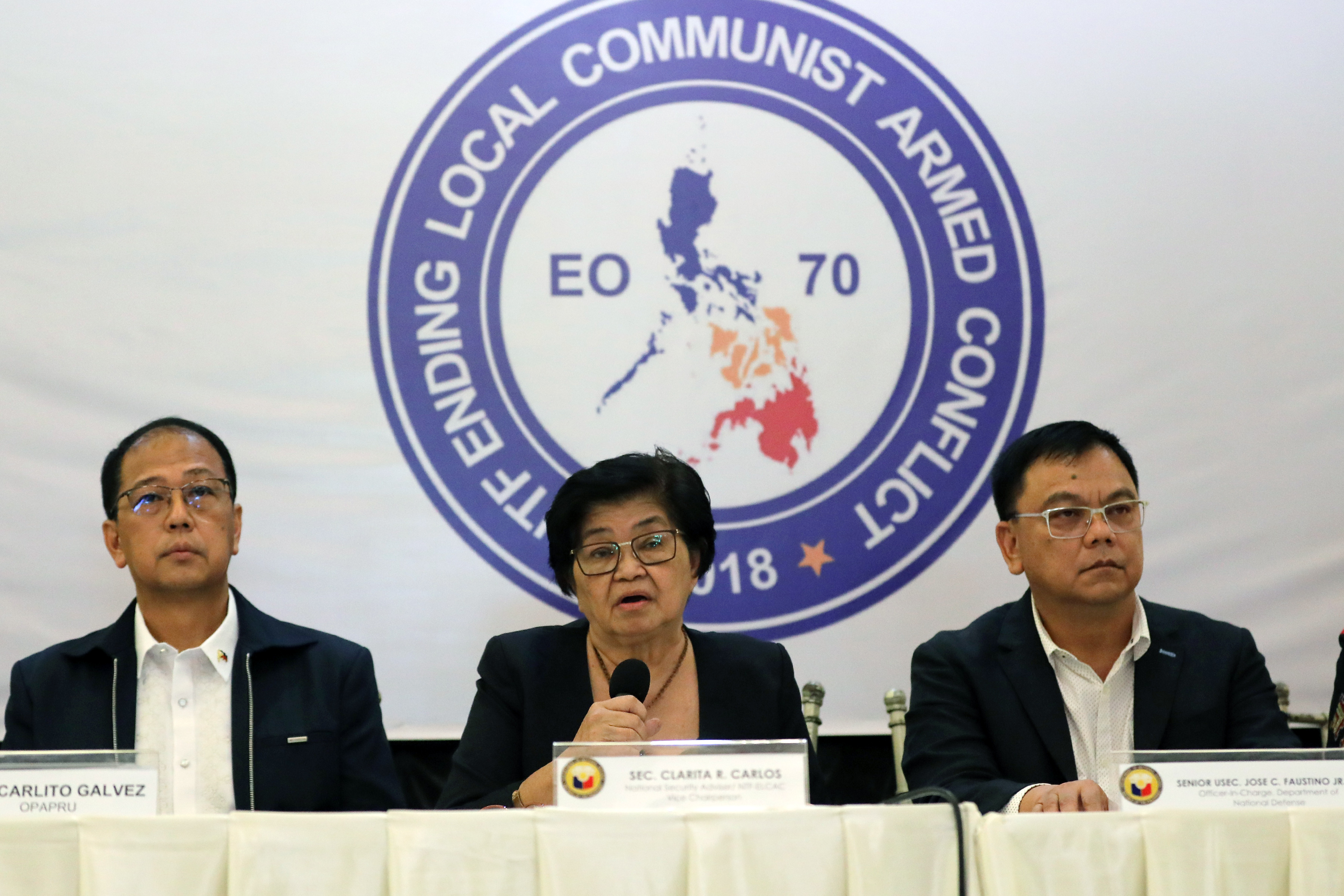
National Security Adviser and NTF-ELCAC Vice Chairperson Clarita Carlos during the press conference on the first NTF-ELCAC executive committee meeting in Camp Aguinaldo, Quezon City on July 15, 2022

Carlos assumed her position as National Security Adviser on June 30, 2022 under the administration of President Bongbong Marcos. She is the first female and third civilian to hold the position since 1986.

Carlos, upon assuming office, has expressed opposition to the use of "red-tagging," or the practice of alleging government critics and activists as communist terrorists, calling it "counterproductive," and preferring a more humane approach in dealing with the communist insurgency in the Philippines by focusing on the "roots of insurgency". The National Task Force to End Local Communist Armed Conflict (NTF-ELCAC), established during the previous administration and where Carlos also serves as vice-chair as part of her mandate, has been criticized for allegedly engaging in such practices.

Carlos resigned from the position on January 14, 2023, to join the Congressional Policy and Budget Research Department (CPBRD) of the House of Representatives. Carlos claimed that she resigned following her correspondence to President Marcos due to reasons she cannot disclose due to "national security concerns" to resolve the "problem". Marcos himself denies any plot to remove Carlos from her role. Carlos was replaced by former Interior and Local Government Secretary Eduardo Año.

=== Consultancy ===
Since 1993, Carlos is the executive director of StratSearch Foundation, Inc., a public policy think tank. She is also the executive director of Asia Pacific Institute of Climate Change Mitigation and Adaptation, Inc. She has also served as consultant in the Philippine Senate and House of Representatives, Office of the Presidential Adviser on the Peace Process, and Department of Transportation.

== Selected works ==
- Carlos, Clarita R.; Lalata, Dennis M. (2010). Democratic Deficits in the Philippines: What is to be done? Philippines: Center for Political and Democratic Reform, Inc., Konrad Adenauer Foundation, and Centrist Democratic Movement. ISBN 978-971-94932-0-4.
- Carlos, Clarita R. (2004). Towards Bureaucratic Reform: Issues and Challenges. Philippines: Konrad Adenauer Foundation. ISBN 978-971-91781-9-4.
- Carlos, Clarita R. (1997). Handbook of Political Parties and Elections in the Philippines. Philippines: Konrad Adenauer Foundation. ISBN 978-971-91781-3-2.
- Carlos, Clarita R. (1996). The Philippines in ASEAN: An Assessment of 27 Years of Cooperation in Selected Functional Areas. Philippines: Foreign Service Institute. ISBN 978-971-55204-0-9.
- Carlos, Clarita R. (1996). Elections in the Philippines from Pre-colonial Period to the Present. Philippines: Konrad Adenauer Foundation. ISBN 978-971-91781-1-8.

Academic offices
| Preceded by Eduardo Cabanlig | President of the National Defense College of the Philippines; 1998–2001 | Succeeded by Carlos Agustin |
Political offices
| Preceded by Hermogenes Esperon | National Security Adviser; 2022–2023 | Succeeded by Eduardo Año |
