= Hernando Iriberri =

Filipino general

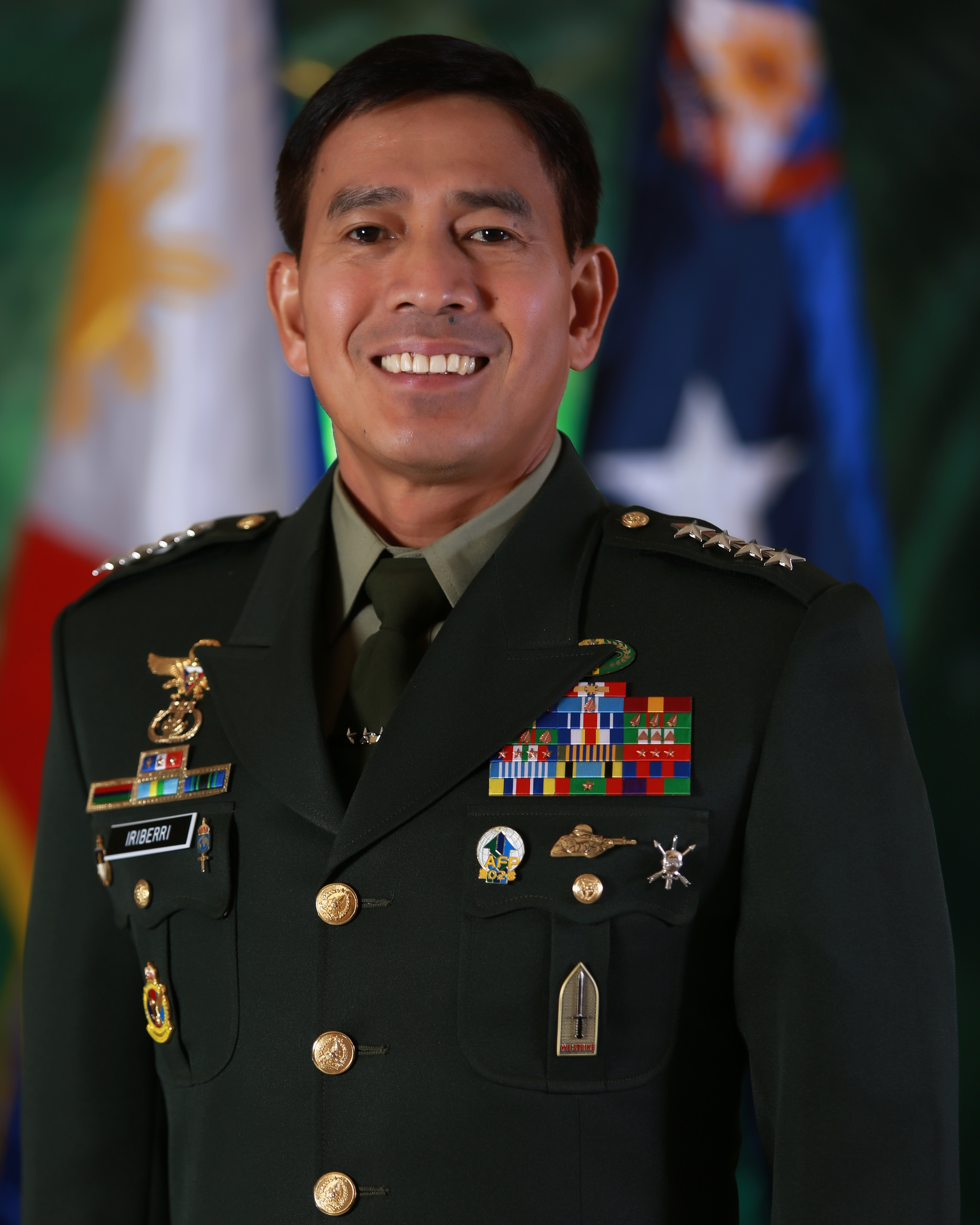
- Official portrait, 2015

46th Chief of Staff of the Armed Forces of the Philippines
- In office July 10, 2015 – April 22, 2016
- President: Benigno Aquino III
- Preceded by: Gen. Gregorio Pio Catapang
- Succeeded by: Lt. Gen. Glorioso Miranda (acting)

Commanding General of the Philippine Army
- In office February 7, 2014 – July 10, 2015

Spokesperson of the Department of National Defense
- In office July 27, 2011 – October 5, 2011
- Appointed by: Voltaire Gazmin
- Preceded by: Eduardo Batac
- Succeeded by: Zosimo Paredes

Personal details
- Born: Hernando Delfin Carmelo Arreza Iriberri; April 22, 1960 (age 66) Cantilan, Surigao del Sur, Philippines
- Education: Philippine Military Academy; Father Saturnino Urios University
- Awards: Distinguished Service Star; Gold Cross Medal; Military Merit Medal
- Nickname: "Super man"

Military service
- Allegiance: Republic of the Philippines
- Branch/service: Philippine Army
- Years of service: 1983 - 2016
- Rank: General
- Unit: Chief of Staff, AFP; Commanding General, PA; 7 PA; 503rd Brigade
- Battles/wars: Communist rebellion in the Philippines; Islamic insurgency in the Philippines

Hernando Delfin Carmelo Arreza Iriberri (born April 22, 1960) is a retired Filipino soldier, and was Chief of Staff of the Armed Forces of the Philippines from July 2015 to April 2016. He had previously been the 56th Commanding General of the Philippine Army since February 7, 2014.

== Biography ==
Iriberri was commissioned in the AFP Regular Force in March 1983 after his graduation from the Philippine Military Academy. Aside from mainly serving as an infantryman, he was also involved in other fields of the Army such as intelligence, public relations and staff functions. Iriberri was involved in international peace support operations.

He had served as spokesman of the Department of National Defense in 2011 during the term of National Defense Secretary Voltaire Gazmin as Commanding General, and Senior Military Assistant at the same department before becoming Commander of the Army's 503rd Brigade in Abra and later Chief of the 7th Infantry Division.

=== Philippine Army ===
Iriberri, who was a Major General at that time, was named Commanding General of the Philippine Army, replacing Lt. Gen. Noel A. Coballes on February 7, 2014 when the latter had reached the mandatory retirement age of 56. Iriberri was promoted to the rank of Lieutenant General on March 31, 2014.

=== Chief of Staff ===
On July 10, 2015, Iriberri was appointed as the 46th Chief of Staff of the Armed Forces of the Philippines at a ceremony in Camp Aguinaldo in Quezon City.

Iriberri's retirement officially took effect on April 22, 2016.

=== Awards ===
- Philippine Republic Presidential Unit Citation
- Philippine Legion of Honor -Officer
- Anti-Dissidence Campaign Medal
- Luzon Anti Dissidence Campaign Medal
- Gold Cross (Philippines)
- Parangal sa Kapanalig ng Sandatahang Lakas ng Pilipinas
- United Nations Service Medal
- Military Civic Action Medal
- Military Commendation Medal
- Military Merit Medal (Philippines)
- Mindanao Anti-dissidence Campaign Medal
- Disaster Relief and Rehabilitation Operations Ribbon
- Combat Commander's Badge (Philippines)
- Distinguished Service Star
- Outstanding Achievement Medal
- Silver Wing Medal
- Bronze Cross Medals
- Gawad sa Kaunlaran
- Malaysian Armed Forces Order of Valor, First Commander
- Scout Ranger Badge
- Combat Commander's Badge (Philippines)
