= Armed Forces of the Philippines Command and General Staff College =

AFP Command and General Staff College Dalubhasaan ng Pangasiwaan at Kawanihang Heneral ng Sandatahang Lakas ng Pilipinas
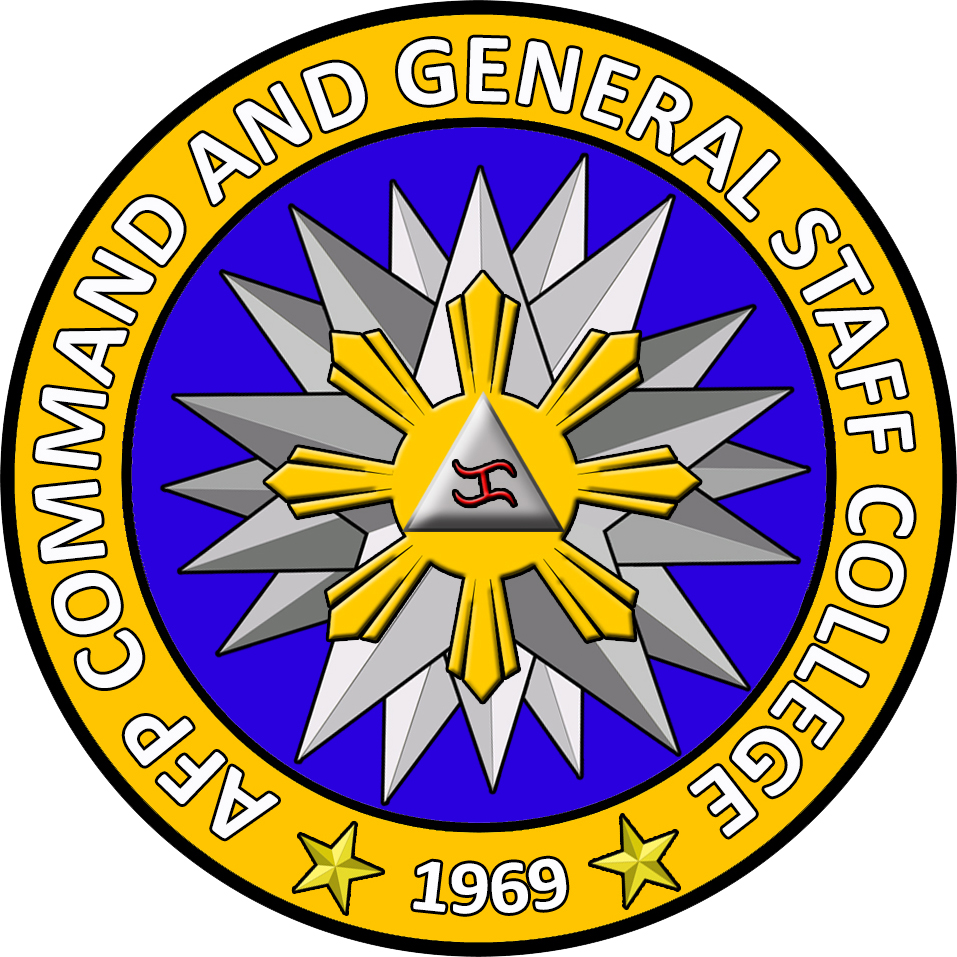
- Unit seal of the AFPCGSC
- Active: January 2, 1969 - Present
- Country: Philippines
- Role: Training
- Part of: Under the Armed Forces of the Philippines
- Garrison/HQ: AFP CGSC Building, CGEA, Quezon City; Army GSC Building, Fort Andres Bonifacio, Metro Manila
- Nickname(s): AFPCGSC,GSC,Command School
- Motto(s): Competence, Unity and Dignity
- Anniversaries: January 2
- Engagements: None

Commanders
- Current commander: MGen Vicente L Querzon Jr AFP

Insignia
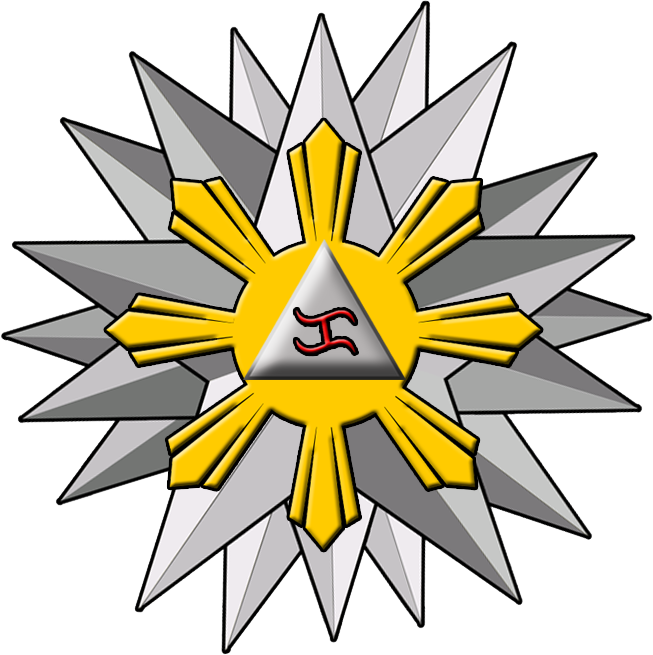
- AFP Joint CGSC Badge

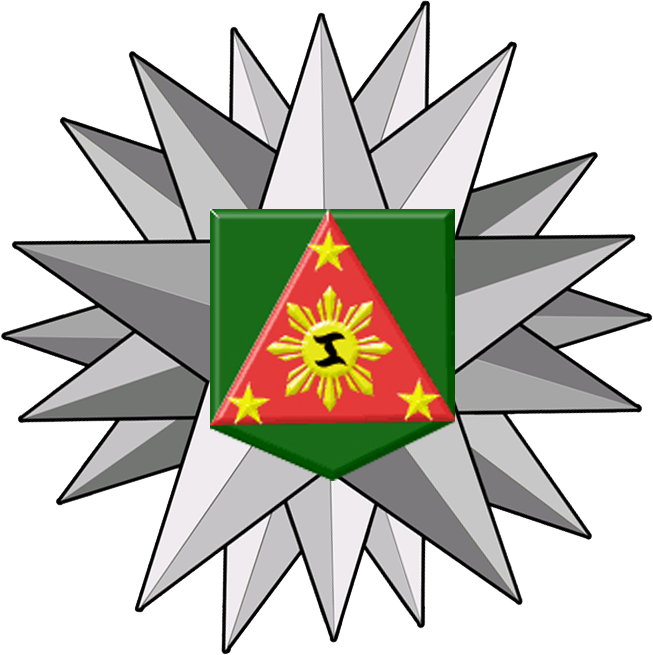
- Philippine Army CGSC Badge

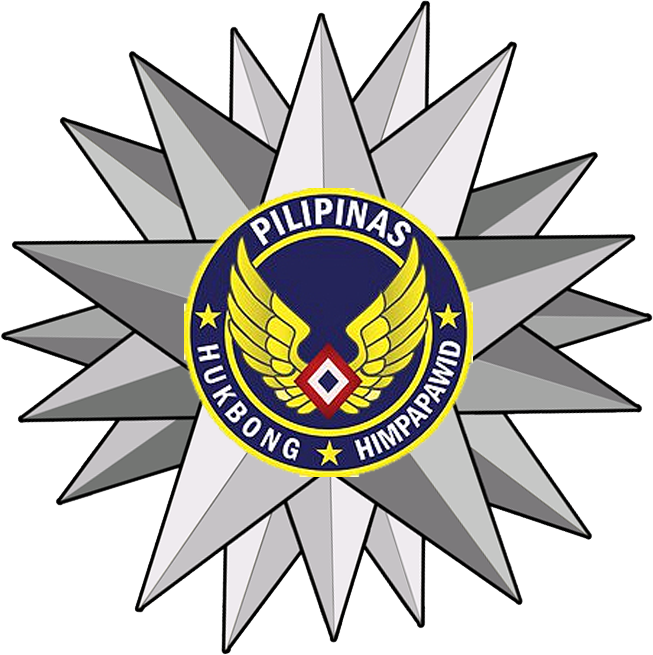
- Philippine Air Force CGSC Badge

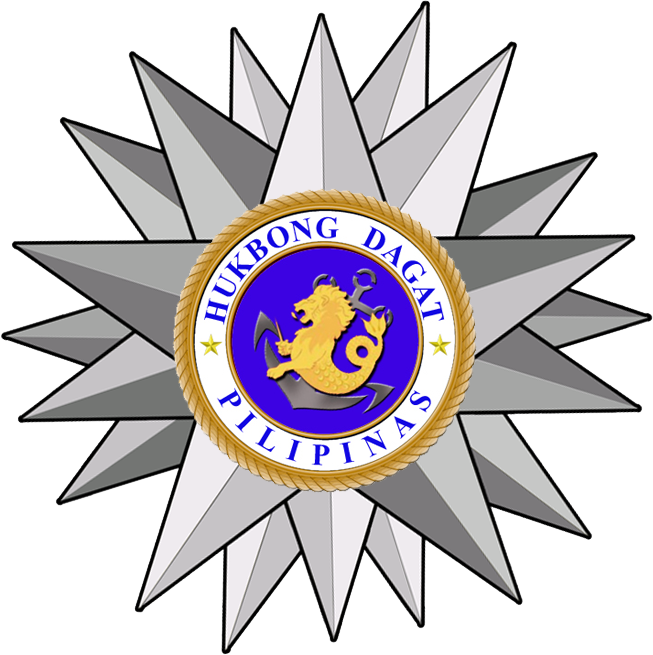
- Philippine Navy CGSC Badge

The Armed Forces of the Philippines Command and General Staff College, known officially as the AFPCGSC or GSC, (Filipino: Dalubhasaan ng Pangasiwaan at Kawanihang Heneral ng Sandatahang Lakas ng Pilipinas) is one of the training units of the Armed Forces of the Philippines. It is tasked with training future generals, as well as general and command staff, and developing doctrine, training materials and courses for the AFP.

== Mission ==
The primary Mission of the AFP Command and General Staff College is to educate selected AFP officers for higher command and staff responsibilities, develop AFP doctrines and promote Philippine military history as part of the continuous efforts in integrating the military as an important part of creating the history of the Philippines. Future Battalion Commanders are required to study in this institution.

== Lineage of Commanding Officers ==
- LtGen Pelagio A Cruz AFP - 01 Jun 53 to 02 Nov 53
- BGen Alfredo M. Santos AFP - 03 Nov 53 to 23 Jul 54
- Col Mamerto A Bautista PA (GSC) - 23 Jul 54 to 4 May 56
- Col Salvador Abcede PA (GSC) - Jan 56 to 16 Oct 57
- BGen Eustacio O Orobia AFP - 1958 to 05 Jul 61
- BGen Felix S Maniego AFP - 05 Jul 61 to 15 Aug 63
- Col Francisco R Isidoro PA (GSC) - 16 Aug 63 to 11 May 64
- BGen Lucas V Cauton AFP - 20 Jul 64 to 31 May 65
- Col Reynaldo R Bocalbos PA (GSC) - 01 Jun 65 to 13 Oct 65
- Col Isauro M Sison PA (GSC) - 14 Oct 65 to 27 Jan 66
- Col Benedicto Alejo PA (GSC) - 28 Jan 66 to 06 Feb 68
- BGen Napoleon C Mangonon AFP - 07 Feb 68 to 31 Aug 68
- Col Candido Gavino PA (GSC) - 01 Sep 68 to 21 Feb 69
- BGen Reynaldo B Perez AFP - 22 Feb 69 to 16 Jan 69
- BGen Constante MA Cruz AFP - 01 Jul 70 to 16 Jan 72
- BGen Ernesto S Gidaya AFP - 16 Jan 72 to 01 Jul 72
- Col Andres C Manipula PA (GSC) - 15 Jul 72 to 27 Mar 76
- BGen Predencio B Regis AFP - 26 Mar 76 to 30 Apr 78
- BGen Isidro B Agunod AFP - 29 Apr 78 to 31 May 83
- BGen Rosalino A Alquiza AFP - 01 Jun 83 to 30 Sep 85
- Col Romulo F Yap PA (GSC) - 01 Oct 85 to 30 Sep 86
- BGen Felicisimo R Amano AFP - 01 Oct 85 to 31 Mar 86
- BGen Felix A Brawner Jr AFP - 01 Apr 86 to 30 Sep 86
- BGen Roland I Patugalan AFP - 01 Oct 86 to 01 Apr 88
- BGen Eduardo T Cabanlig AFP - 25 Mar 88 to 31 Jul 89
- BGen Sesinando C Canding AFP - 01 Aug 89 to 28 Dec 90
- CDRE Pio H Garrindo Jr AFP - 28 Dec 90 to 09 Oct 92
- BGen Arturo F Castro AFP - 09 Oct 92 to 17 May 93
- CDRE Bayani T Matic AFP - 13 May 93 to 19 Jan 94
- Col Ernesto CL Sacro PAF (GSC) - 19 Jan 94 to 09 Feb 94
- LtGen Ismael Z Villareal AFP - 5 May 94 to 17 Jan 97
- RAdm Juan A Sibayan AFP - 22 Jan 97 to 03 Jan 98
- RAdm Octavius S Dauz AFP - 13 Jan 98 to 22 Oct 99
- RAdm Juan A De Leon AFP - 23 Oct 99 to 26 May 00
- LGen Edgardo V Espinosa AFP - 09 Jun 00 to 19 Mar 01
- BGen Emmanuel R Teodosio AFP - 28 Mar 01 to 20 Jul 01
- RAdm Rodolfo R Rabago AFP - 20 Jul 01 to 03 Sep 02
- MGen Emmanuel R Teodosio AFP - 03 Sep 02 to 14 Nov 02
- BGen Reynaldo D Rivera AFP - 14 Nov 02 to 28 Feb 03
- MGen Neon D Ebuen AFP - 01 Mar 01 to 15 Dec 01
- MGen Vicente L Guerzon Jr AFP - 05 Jan 05 to Present

== The General Staff Corps Badge ==
The General Staff Corps Badge is awarded by the Armed Forces of the Philippines or its Service Branches to successful general staff candidates who successfully pass and complete the requirements set forth in the Program of Instructions of the AFP Command and General Staff Course.

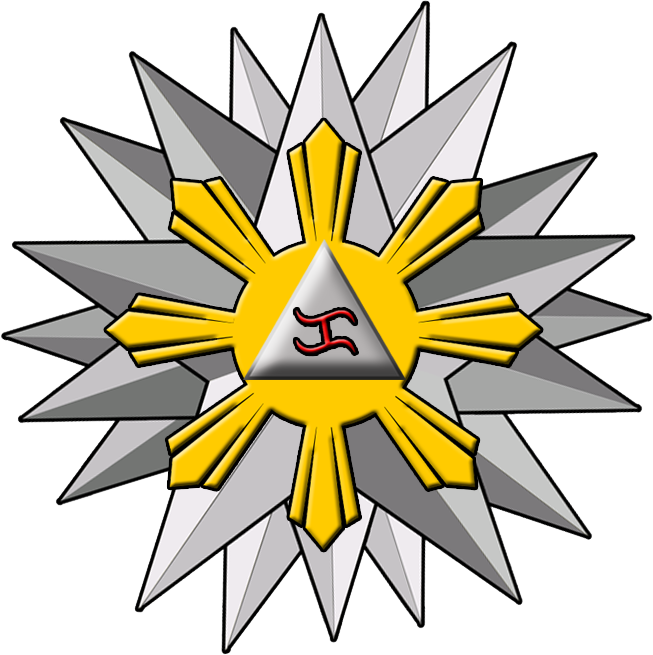
AFP Joint CGSC Badge

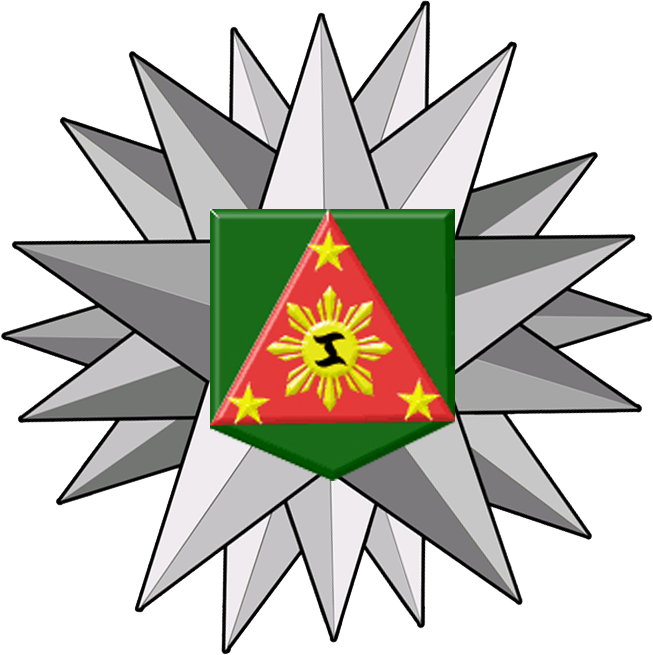
Philippine Army CGSC Badge

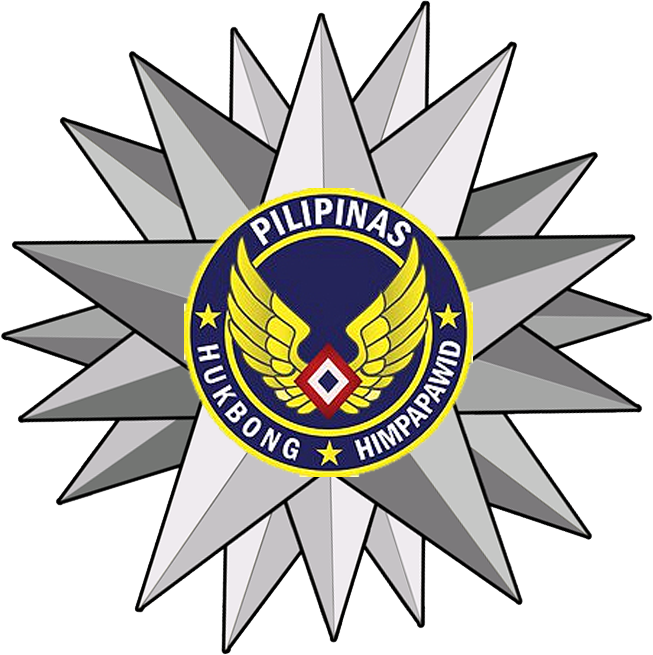
Philippine Air Force CGSC Badge

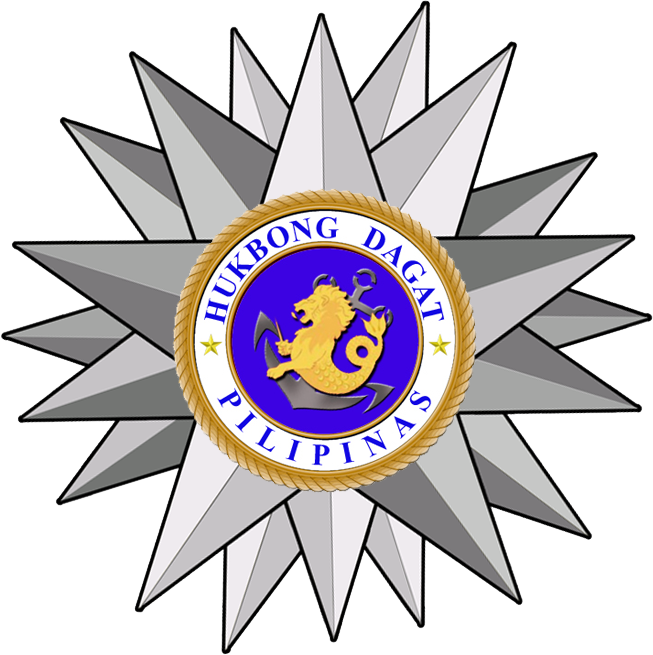
Philippine Navy and Marine Corps CGSC Badge

== See also ==
- AFP Reserve Command Training Group
- Philippine Military Academy
- Reserve Officer Training Corps (Philippines)
