= 10th Infantry Division (Philippines) =

10th Infantry (Agila) Division
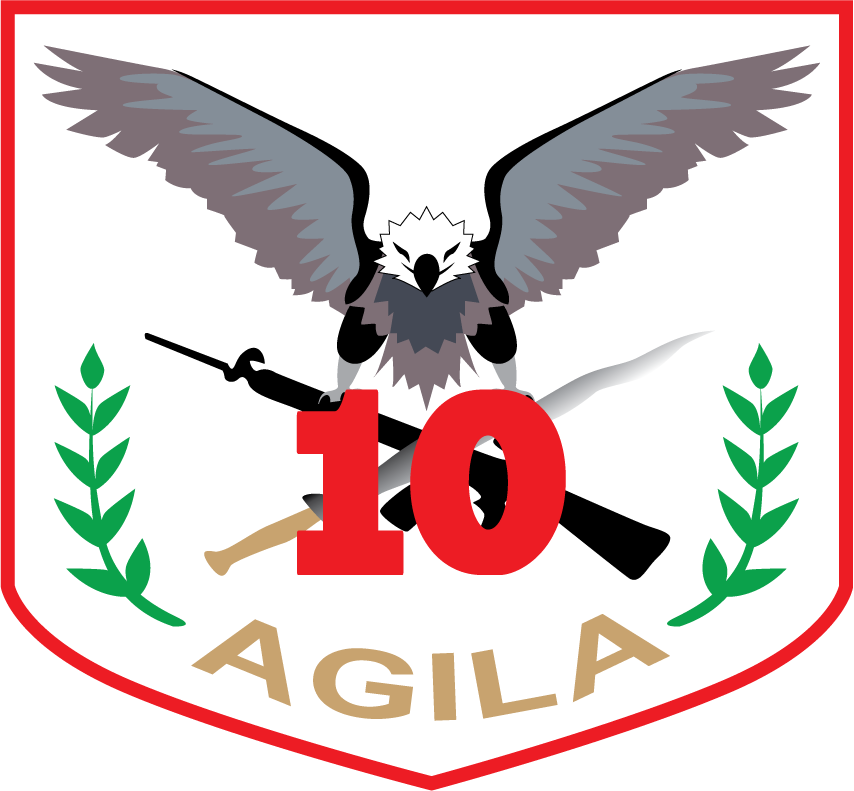
- Official Seal of the 10th Infantry (Agila) Division
- Active: August 16, 2006 – Present
- Country: Philippines
- Branch: Philippine Army
- Type: Infantry
- Role: Conventional Warfare, Anti-Guerrilla Operations
- Size: 4 Brigades
- Part of: Under the Philippine Army (Since 2006)
- Garrison/HQ: Camp General Manuel T Yan Sr., Brgy. Tuboran, Mawab, Davao de Oro
- Nickname: Agila Division
- Mascot: Philippine eagle
- Anniversaries: August 16
- Engagements: Islamic Insurgency in the Philippines; Anti-guerilla operations against the NPA and the Moro Islamic Liberation Front

Commanders
- Current commander: MGen Allan D. Hambala, PA
- Notable commanders: MGen Ernesto D. Boac AFP; MGen Jogy Leo L. Fojas AFP; MGen Reynaldo B. Mapagu AFP; MGen Jorge V. Segovia AFP; MGen Carlos B. Holganza AFP; BGen Ariel B. Bernardo AFP

Insignia
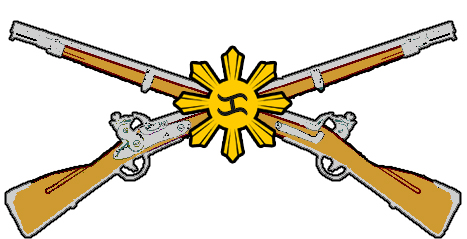
- Armed Forces Occupation Specialty Insignia

The 10th Infantry Division, Philippine Army, also called the Agila Division, is one of the Philippine Army's infantry units in Mindanao.

== History ==
Pursuant to HPA General Orders No. 355 dated 9 August 2006, the 10th Infantry "Agila" Division, PA was activated effective August 16, 2006 and established its division headquarters at Camp Panacan, Davao City with then Major General Ernesto D. Boac as the first Division Commander.

The activation of 10th Infantry "Agila" Division, PA in Mindanao was envisioned to effectively address the enemy's center of gravity; enhance command and control; support the government's holistic approach and promote synergy among Army units; delineate units that will confront the Communist Terrorist Movement (CTM), the Moro Islamic Liberation Front (MILF) and the Auxiliary Threat Group; diminish administrative, logistical and operational problems; and efficiently address the current security problem that hinders the country's economic growth.

Upon the activation, the division absorbed one brigade from 6th Infantry Division (6ID) with four maneuver battalions, namely, 601st Infantry Brigade which is now the 1002nd Brigade, 39th Infantry Battalion, 25th Infantry Battalion, 27th Infantry Battalion, and 66th Infantry Battalion. The division also absorbed Task Force GenSan and 12th Field Artillery Battalion from 6ID. Units from 4th Infantry Division was also absorbed, namely: 404th Infantry Brigade which is now the 1001st Infantry Brigade, Task Force Davao, 28th Infantry Battalion, 60th Infantry Battalion, 73rd Infantry Battalion, 67th Infantry Battalion, 72nd Cadre Battalion, 44th Division Reconnaissance Company, 4th Military Intelligence Company and 10th Signal Battalion.

On February 11, 2011, the Division moved to its permanent headquarters at Camp General Manuel T. Yan in Barangay Tuburan, Mawab, Davao de Oro.

== Area of Responsibility ==
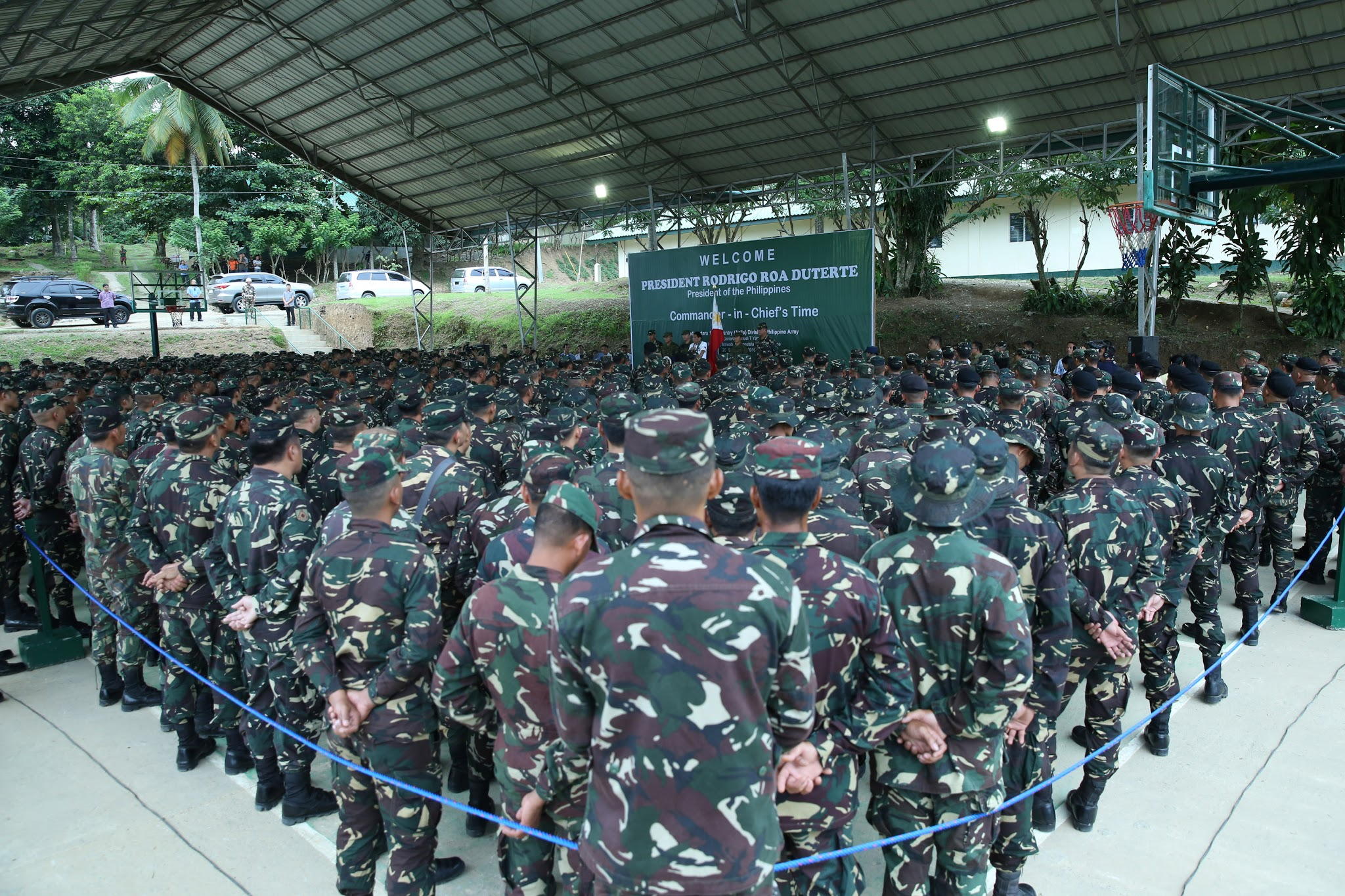
President Rodrigo Duterte delivers his speech at the 10th Infantry Division in Compostela Valley in September 2016

The division has operational responsibility over the Davao Region (Region 11), parts of Soccsksargen (Sarangani, South Cotabato, 2nd district of Cotabato and Columbio, Sultan Kudarat), Trento, Agusan del Sur and Lingig, Surigao del Sur. 10ID AOR encompasses 4 Regions, 12 provinces, 7 cities, 72 municipalities and 1, 681 barangays. It has a total land area of 34,000 square kilometres (13,000 sq mi) and an estimated population of 6.4 million with mixed religious beliefs such as the Christians, Lumads and Muslims.

The area has mining industries, fishing industry. Notable among them are the Toril Fish Port and the Gensan Port in Davao City and General Santos, respectively. The area is also home of the biggest banana and pineapple plantations in the country. It has an international airport and the commercially important Davao Gulf.

Davao City is the regional center of Region 11, and its Francisco Bangoy International Airport is the third busiest airport in the country. Davao is a melting pot of various cultures, which include minority indigenous groups such as the Bagobo, Mandaya, Mansaka, and Maguindanaos. Among the local languages spoken are Dinabaw, Visayan language, as well as Tagalog and English.

== Lineage of Commanders ==
- MGen Ernesto D Boac AFP (16 August 2006 – 11 March 2008)
- MGen Jogy Leo L Fojas AFP (12 March 2008 – 10 February 2009)
- MGen Reynaldo B Mapagu AFP (10 February 2009 – 16 November 2009)
- MGen Carlos B Holganza AFP (16 November 2009 – 3 August 2010)
- MGen Jorge V Segovia AFP (3 August 2010 – 22 April 2012)
- MGen Ariel B Bernardo AFP (23 April 2012 – 14 July 2014)
- MGen Eduardo M Año AFP (15 July 2014 – 16 July 2015)
- BGen Benjamin R Madrigal Jr AFP (16 July 2015 – 1 September 2015)
- MGen Rafael C Valencia AFP (1 September 2015 – 31 May 2017)
- MGen Noel S Clement AFP (31 May 2017 – 22 December 2018)
- MGen Jose C. Faustino Jr. AFP (22 December 2018 – 25 January 2020)
- MGen Reuben S. Basiao, AFP (25 January 2020 – 4 March 2021)
- MGen Ernesto C. Torres Jr. AFP (4 March 2021 – 22 February 2022)
- MGen Nolasco A. Mempin AFP (22 February 2022 – Present)

== Current units ==
The Brigades under the 10th Infantry Division:

- 1001st Infantry "Pag-asa" Brigade
- 1002nd Infantry "Bagwis" Brigade
- 1003rd Infantry "Raptor" Brigade

The Battalions under the 10th Infantry Division:

- 25th Infantry "Fireball" Battalion
- 28th Infantry “Kamagong” Battalion
- 27th Infantry "Action" Battalion
- 39th Infantry "Smashers" Battalion
- 60th Infantry "Mediator" Battalion
- 67th Infantry "Agila" Battalion
- 71st Infantry "Kaibigan" Battalion
- 73rd Infantry "Neutralizer" Battalion
- 89th Infantry "Makatao" Battalion
- 66th Infantry “Kabalikat” Battalion

Task Forces under 10th Infantry Division

- Task Force Davao

• Task Group Agila
• Task Group Falcon
• Task Group Lawin
• Task Group Condor
• Task Group IGACOS

- Task Force Gensan

The Support Units under the 10th Infantry Division:

- 10th CMO "Kalinaw" Battalion
- 10th Training Unit (DTU)
- 10th Division Training School (DTS)
- 10th Military Intelligence Battalion

Units that are OPCON under the 10th Infantry Division:

- 2nd Field Artillery “First Round Accuracy” Battalion, AAR
- 11th Regional Community Defense Group, RCPA
- 12th Regional Community Defense Group, RCPA
