= AFP Northern Luzon Command =

Philippine Military's unified branch command for Northern Luzon

Coordinates: 15°26′16.32″N 120°35′40.00″E

Northern Luzon Command Pamunuan ng Hilagang Luzon
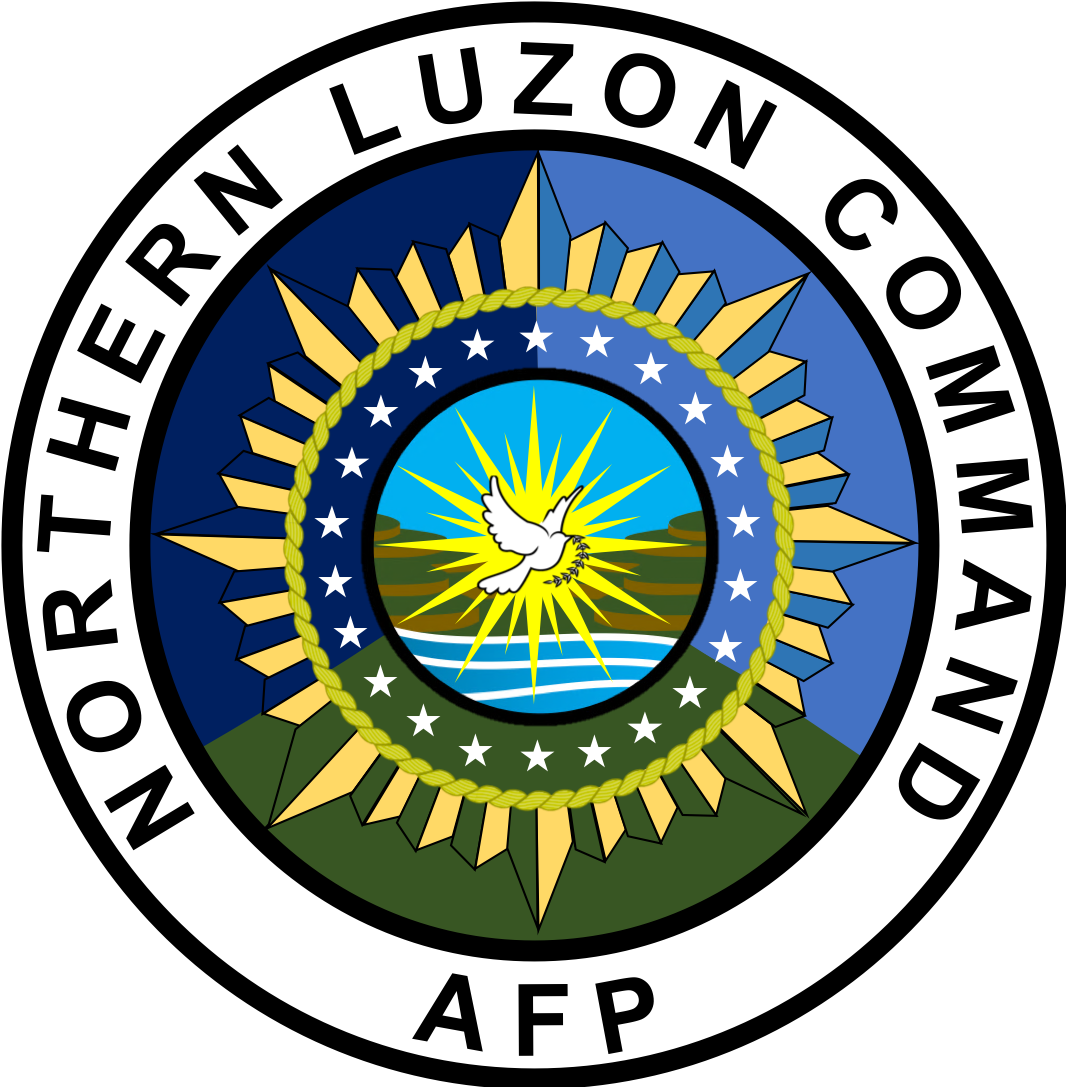
- Seal of Northern Luzon Command
- Active: 1 April 1987 - Present
- Country: Philippines
- Type: Unified Command
- Role: Conventional and Unconventional Warfare, Anti-Guerrilla Operations, Protecting the Sovereign Territory
- Part of: Armed Forces of the Philippines
- Garrison/HQ: Camp Servillano Aquino, Tarlac City
- Nickname: NOLCOM
- Motto: Home of the Philippine Northern Beacon
- Anniversaries: 1 April
- Engagements: Counter-insurgency operations against the NPA and local criminal elements
- Decorations: Philippine Republic Presidential Unit Citation Badge

Commanders
- Current commander: Lt. Gen Aristotle D. Gonzalez, PAF
- Notable commanders: LtGen. Rodrigo F. Maclang; BGen. Bayani N. Fabic, AFP; MGen. Romulo F. Yap, AFP; MGen. Edgardo T. Batenga, AFP; LtGen. Rodolfo C. Garcia; LtGen. Romeo B. Dominguez, AFP; LtGen. Romeo P. Tolentino, AFP; Gen. Gregorio Pio P. Catapang Jr.

The Northern Luzon Command (abbrv. as NOLCOM) is the Armed Forces of the Philippines' unified command in charge of the Ilocos Region, Cordillera Administrative Region, Cagayan Valley and Central Luzon, including the Scarborough Shoal and the Benham Rise. It is responsible for the defense of these areas against external aggression, as well as combating terrorism and insurgency.

== Mission ==
Conduct joint operations by integrating capabilities of assigned forces during peace, conflict and war including military operations other than war in its Joint Area of Operations in support of the AFP mission.

== History ==
On 1 October 1972, the Northeast Command (NOREASCOM), Armed Forces of the Philippines, was organized and activated pursuant to General Headquarters, Armed Forces of the Philippines, Letter of Instruction 5/72, with an area of responsibility including: Cagayan, Ifugao, Isabela, Kalinga-Apayao, Nueva Vizcaya, Quirino and Aurora.

On 14 November 1981, pursuant to General Headquarters, Armed Forces of the Philippines Letter of Instruction 2/81, the NOREASCOM AOR was expanded to include the Regional Command 1 (RECOM 1) AOR. The resulting command was redesignated Northern Command (NORTHCOM).

On 1 April 1984, General Headquarters, Armed Forces of the Philippines issued Letter of Instruction 1/84, which redesignated NORTHCOM as Regional Unified Command 2 (RUC 2). Its AOR consisted of all the provinces contained in the Philippine's Region 2.

On 1 April 87, General Headquarters, Armed Forces of the Philippines issued Letter of Instruction 3/87 creating a unified command spanning Regions 1 and 2. This unit was designated as Northern Luzon Command (NOLCOM). It was initially headquartered at Camp Melchor F Dela Cruz, Gamu, Isabela. On 29 March 1988, NOLCOM was reorganized as an area command covering Northern and Central Luzon. Its headquarters was also transferred to Camp Aquino, Tarlac City.

1 April 2002, NOLCOM was deactivated and subsequently reactivated as a unified command pursuant to a Secretary of National Defence memo to the Chief of Staff, Armed Forces of the Philippines, dated 12 April 2002.

On 15 January 2009, to further enhance and support its internal security operations campaign in Central and Northern Luzon, NOLCOM activated Joint Task Force Amihan, pursuant to Letter of Instruction 01-2009. The JTF would be headed by the Deputy Commander, NOLCOM with Task Groups under it composed of personnel from the joint services under the Command and complemented by local Philippine National Police personnel.

== Lineage of Commanding Officers ==
- BGen Bayani N Fabic AFP (29 Mar 1988 – 10 Jul 1989)
- BGen Orlando Q Antonio AFP (10 Jul 1989 – 29 Mar 1990)
- BGen Gumersindo T Yap AFP (29 Mar 1990 – 27 Dec 1990)
- BGen Ernesto B Calupig AFP (27 Dec 1990 – 17 Jun 1992)
- MGen Romulo F Yap AFP (17 Jun 1992 – 26 Aug 1993)
- MGen Orlando V Soriano AFP (26 Aug 1993 – 16 Apr 1994)
- MGen Edgardo T Batenga AFP (16 Apr 1994 – 7 Apr 1995)
- MGen Oswaldo P Villanueva AFP (22 Jul 1995 – 9 Jan 1997)
- MGen Ismael Z Villareal AFP (22 Jan 1997 – 1 Oct 1997)
- MGen Rene S Dado AFP (1 Oct 1997 – 19 Feb 1999)
- MGen Rolando C Bautista AFP (19 Feb 1999 – 30 Oct 1999)
- MGen Arturo B Carrillo AFP (30 Oct 1999 – 28 Mar 2001)
- LtGen Rodolfo C Garcia AFP (28 Mar 2001 – 5 Feb 2003)
- LtGen Romeo B Dominguez AFP (5 Feb 2003 – 16 Aug 2005)
- LtGen Romeo P Tolentino AFP (16 Aug 2005 – 21 Jul 2006)
- LtGen Bonifacio B Ramos AFP (21 Jul 2006 – 16 Aug 2007)
- LtGen Rodrigo F Maclang AFP (16 Aug 2007 – 6 May 2008)
- LtGen Isagani C Cachuela AFP (6 May 2008 – 16 Jun 2009)
- LtGen Ricardo A David Jr AFP (16 Jun 2009 – 2 Jul 2010)
- LtGen Gaudencio S Pangilinan AFP (2 Jul 2010 – 22 Jul 2011)
- LtGen Jessie Dellosa AFP (22 Jul 2011 – 12 Dec 2011)
- (OIC) MGen Ricardo Banayat AFP (13 Dec 2011 – 20 Jan 2012)
- LtGen Anthony J Alcantara AFP (21 Jan 2012 – 5 July 2013)
- LtGen Gregorio Pio P. Catapang Jr. AFP (5 July 2013 – 9 June 2014 )
- LtGen Felicito Virgilio M Trinidad Jr AFP (9 June 2014 – 13 Aug 2015)
- LtGen Glorioso V Miranda AFP (13 Aug 2015 – 10 March 2016)
- LtGen Romeo Tanalgo AFP (10 March 2016 – Sep.4, 2017)
- LtGen Emmanuel Salamat (4 Sep 2017 – 7 July 2019)
- LtGen Ramiro Manuel A. Rey (7 July 2019 – 20 September 2020)
- LtGen Arnulfo Marcelo B. Burgos Jr. (20 September 2020 - 01 December 2021)
- (Acting) BGen Andrew D. Costelo (01 December 2021 - 24 January 2022)
- LtGen Ernesto C. Torres (24 January 2022 - 25 January 2023)
- LtGen Fernyl G. Buca (25 January 2023 - 24 October 2025)
- LtGen Aristotle Danan Gonzalez, PAF (24 October 2025 - now)

== Organization ==
The following are the units that are under the Northern Luzon Command:

- 5th Infantry (Star) Division, PA
- 7th Infantry (Kaugnay) Division, PA
- Tactical Operations Wing Northern Luzon, PAF
- Naval Forces Northern Luzon, PN
- Support Command, Philippine Army
- Civilian Human Resource

== Operations ==
- Territorial Defense Operations
- Internal Security Operations
- Humanitarian Assistance and Disaster Response Operations
- Law Enforcement Support Operations
- Multi-Stakeholder and Inter-agency Operations
- Annually-Held Multilateral Defense-Security Operations (also known as Balikatan)

== Awards and decorations ==
=== Campaign streamers ===
Award Streamer	Streamer Name	Operation	Date Awarded	Reference
	Presidential Unit Citation Badge	SAR/DRR Ops, TS Parma	4 February 2010	General Orders No. 112, GHQ-AFP, dtd 4 Feb '10
	Presidential Unit Citation Badge	General Elections, Philippines	1 July 2010	General Orders No. 641, GHQ-AFP, dtd 1 July '10

=== Badges ===
Military Badge	Badge Name	Operation	Date Awarded	Reference
	AFP Election Duty Badge	General Elections, Philippines	21 May 2010	General Orders No. 513, GHQ-AFP, dtd 21 May '10
