= Ricardo David =

Filipino general

Gen. Ricardo A. David, Jr.
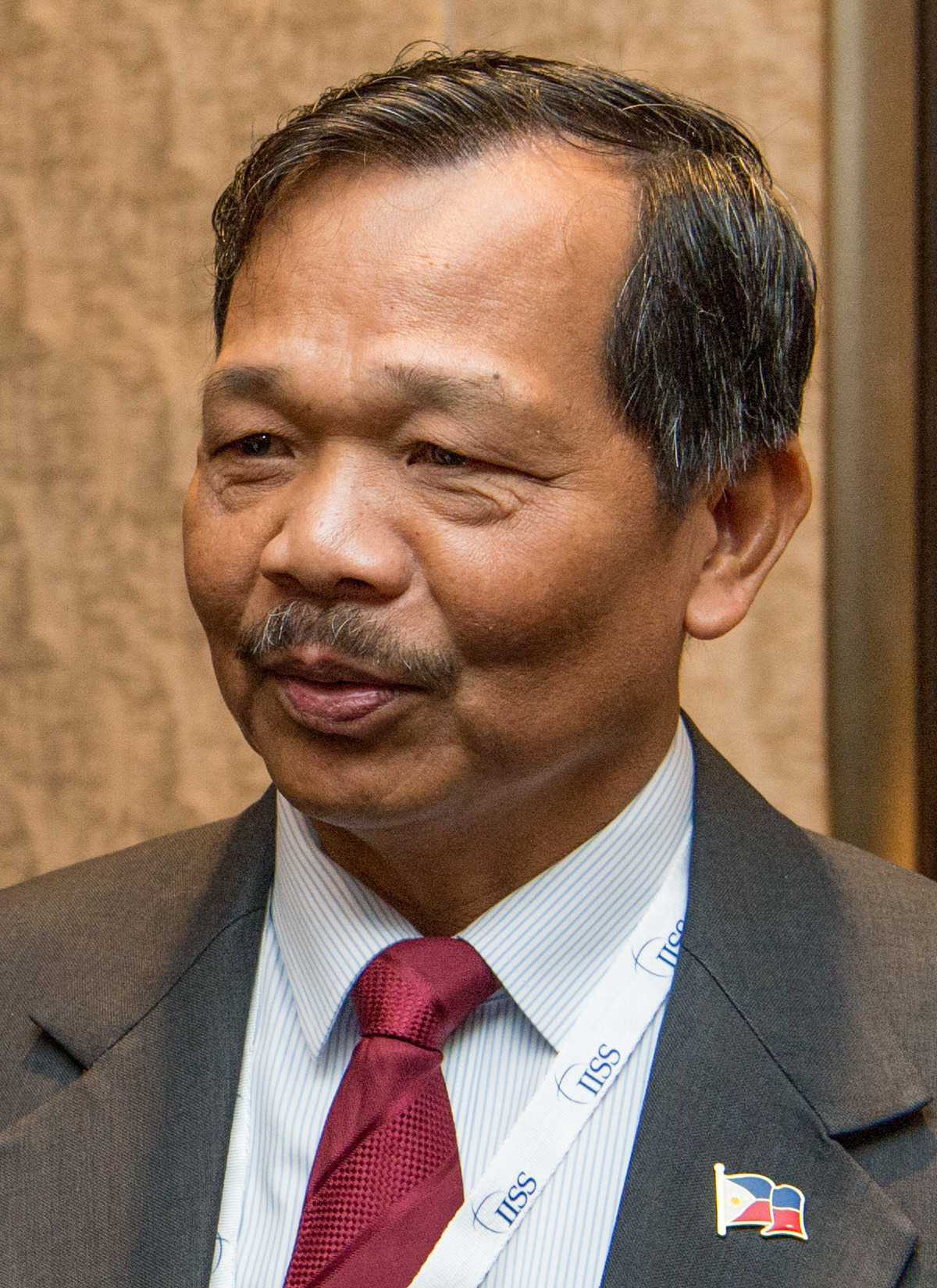

41st Chief of Staff of the Armed Forces of the Philippines
- In office June 30, 2010 – March 8, 2011
- President: Benigno Aquino III
- Preceded by: Lt. Gen. Nestor Z. Ochoa (Acting)
- Succeeded by: Gen. Eduardo Oban Jr.

Personal details
- Education: Philippine Military Academy
- Profession: Military

Military service
- Allegiance: Republic of the Philippines
- Branch/service: Philippine Army
- Rank: General
- Commands: Chief of Staff of the Armed Forces of the Philippines; AFP Northern Luzon Command; 4th Infantry Division; Army Support Command; AFP Command Center; 402nd Infantry Brigade, 4th ID; 50th Infantry Battalion, 5 ID

Ricardo A. David, Jr is a former Chief of staff of the Philippine Armed Forces. He was the Armed Forces Northern Luzon Command chief. On June 30, 2010, President Benigno Aquino III picked David as his AFP chief. On July 2, 2010, Ricardo David assumes the command of the Armed Forces of the Philippines from Lt Gen. Nestor Z. Ochoa. He previously served as the Undersecretary for Defense Policy of the Department of National Defense.

== Background ==
He was born in 1955 in San Fernando, Pampanga, but spent most of his childhood in Victoria, Tarlac.

He took up his primary education in Dolores Elementary School of Dolores, San Fernando, Pampanga and he graduated at the top of his class in 1967. He graduated from Victoria High School in Tarlac as the Salutatorian of his class in 1971. Upon graduating high school, he took up undergraduate studies in engineering at St. Louis University in Baguio City on a full scholarship program. After a couple of years of studies, he traded one scholarship program for another when he took his Oath as a Cadet of the Philippine Military Academy on April 1, 1973; He graduated from the Philippine Military Academy on March 1, 1977.

== Military career ==
He was the Commanding Officer of the 50th Infantry Battalion of the 5th Infantry Division from December 1996 to April 1998. He also became the Commanding General of the 402nd Infantry Brigade of the 4th Infantry Division from March 2005 to December 2006. This was followed by his assignment to the AFP Command Center until August 2007. Afterwards, he commanded the Army Support Command until April 2008, then the 4th Infantry Division until June 2009 and from there to the AFP Northern Luzon Command up to the time he became the Chief of Staff, Armed Forces of the Philippines on July 2, 2010.

== Awards ==
- Philippine Republic Presidential Unit Citation
- Martial Law Unit Citation
- People Power I Unit Citation
- People Power II Unit Citation
- Distinguished Service Stars
- - Philippine Legion of Honor, Degree of Officer & Chief Commander
- Outstanding Achievement Medal
- Gawad sa Kaunlaran
- Bronze Cross Medals
- Military Merit Medals
- Silver Wing Medal
- Military Commendation Medals
- Military Civic Action Medals
- Sagisag ng Ulirang Kawal
- Long Service Medal
- Anti-dissidence Campaign Medal
- Luzon Anti-Dissidence Campaign Medal
- Mindanao Anti-Dissidence Campaign Medal
- Disaster Relief and Rehabilitation Operations Ribbon
- Combat Commander's Badge
- AFP Parachutist Badge
- Philippine Army Command and General Staff Course Badge
- PAF Gold Wings Badge

== AFP Chief of staff ==
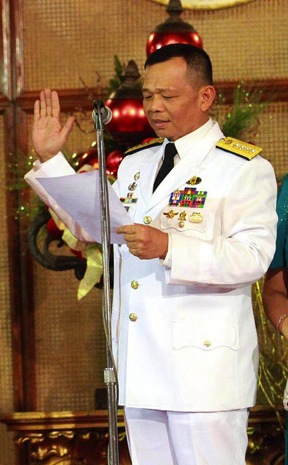
Ricardo David being sworn in as Chief of Staff of the Armed Forces of the Philippines on November 22, 2010

In Gen. David's change-of-command ceremony speech, David reminded his soldiers to keep the military as a "disciplined institution."

He said: "We shall continue to be a responsible instrument of public policy, subservient to civilian authority,"

== Family ==
He is married to Merilou Malacay of Cagayan de Oro City and they have two sons, Russel David and Rommel David.

Preceded by Lt. Gen. Nestor Ochoa	Chief of staff of the Philippine Armed Forces; 2010 – 2011	Succeeded by Gen. Eduardo Oban Jr.
