= Central Luzon =

Administrative region of the Philippines

Central Luzon Gitnang Luzon Tengnga a Luzon Kalibudtarang Luzon Botlay a Luzon Pegley a Luzon Region III
- Region
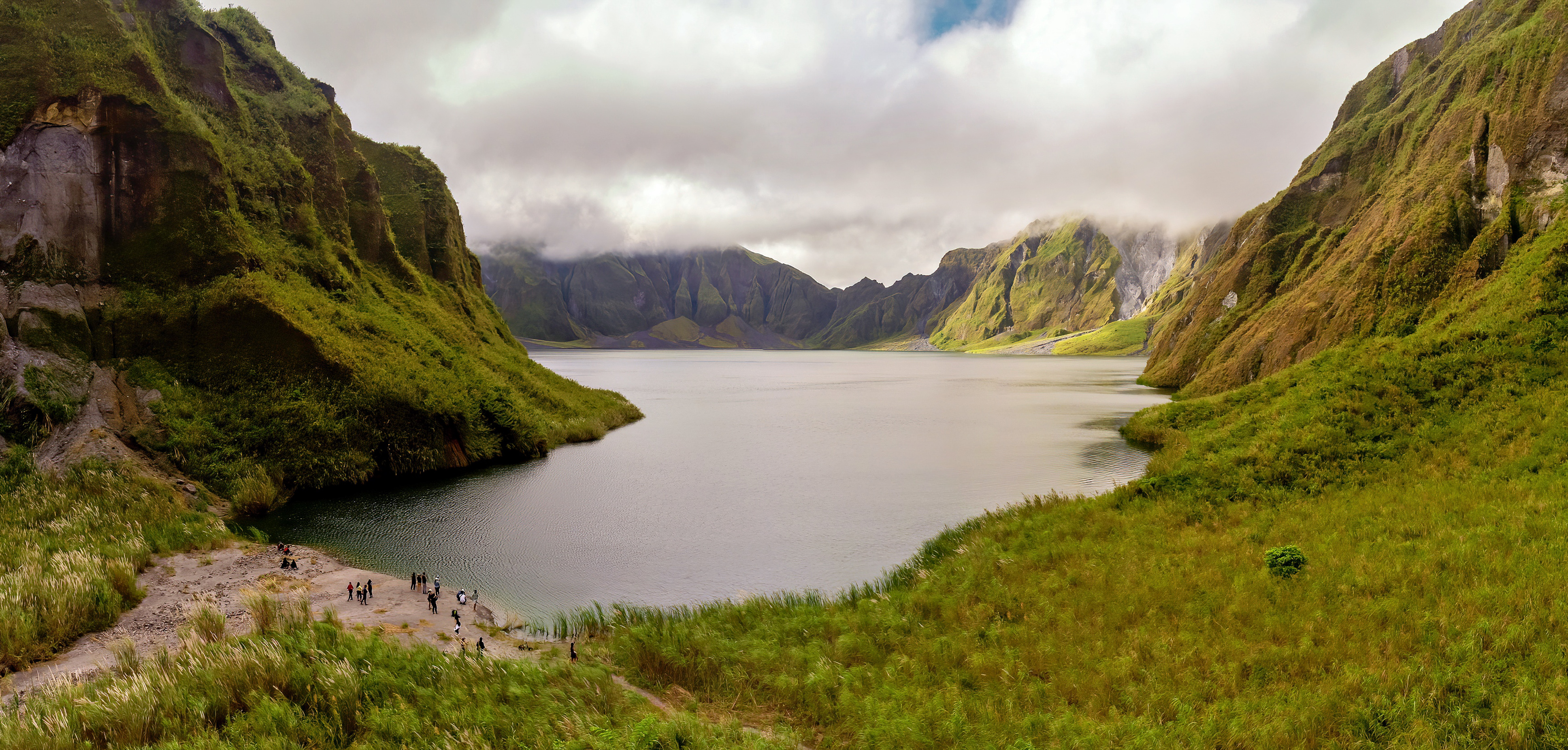
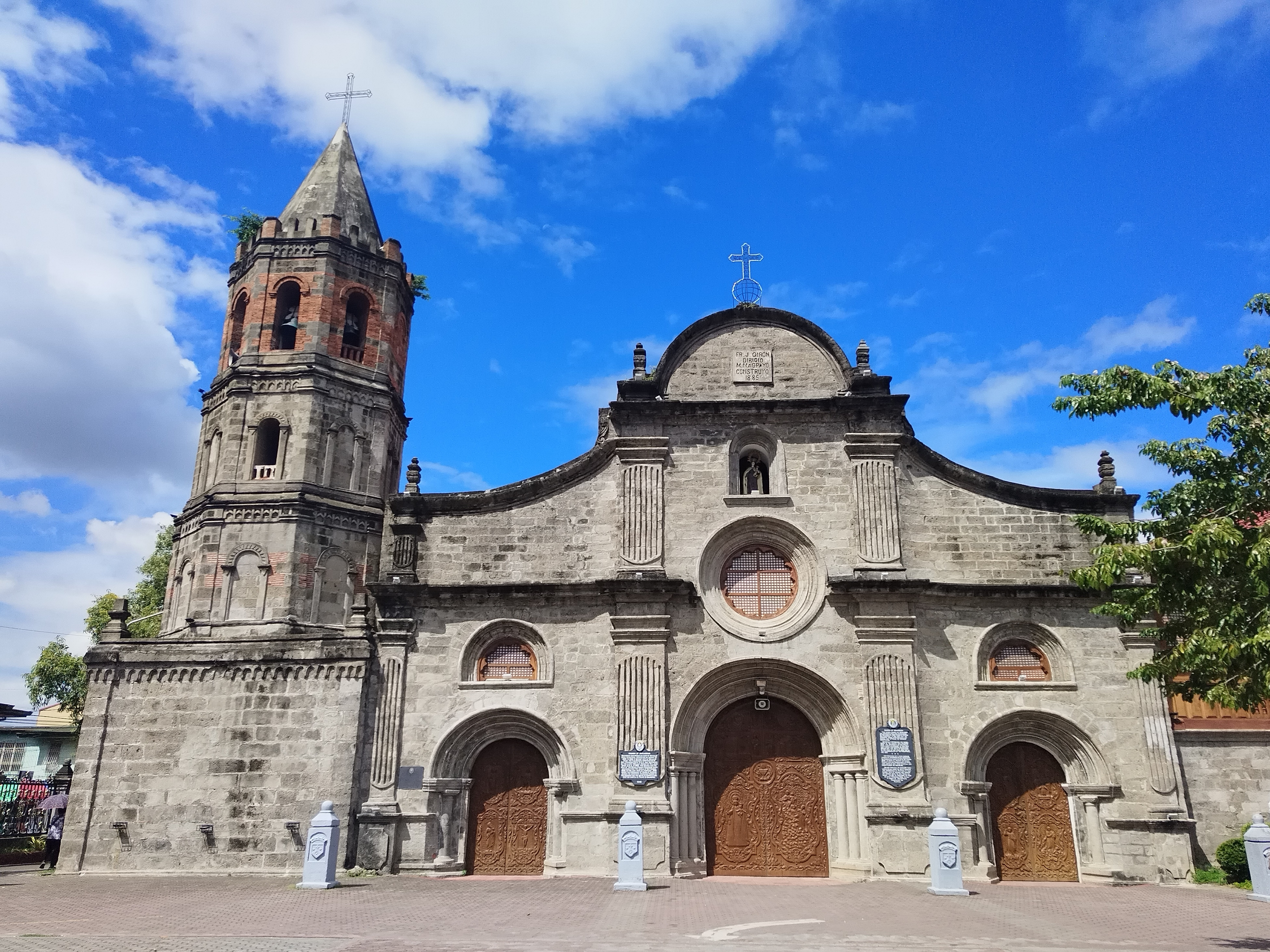
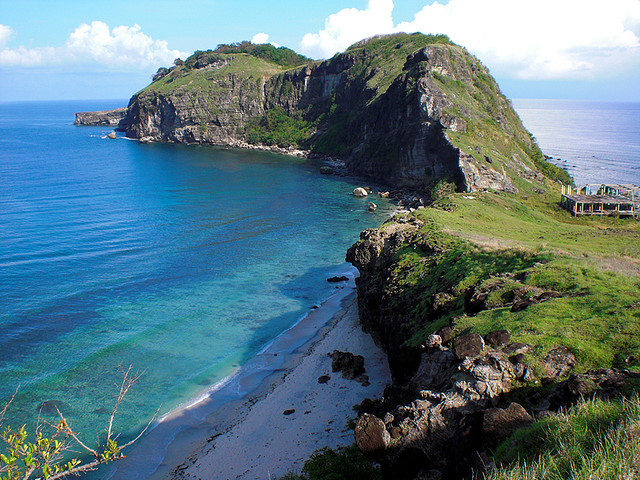
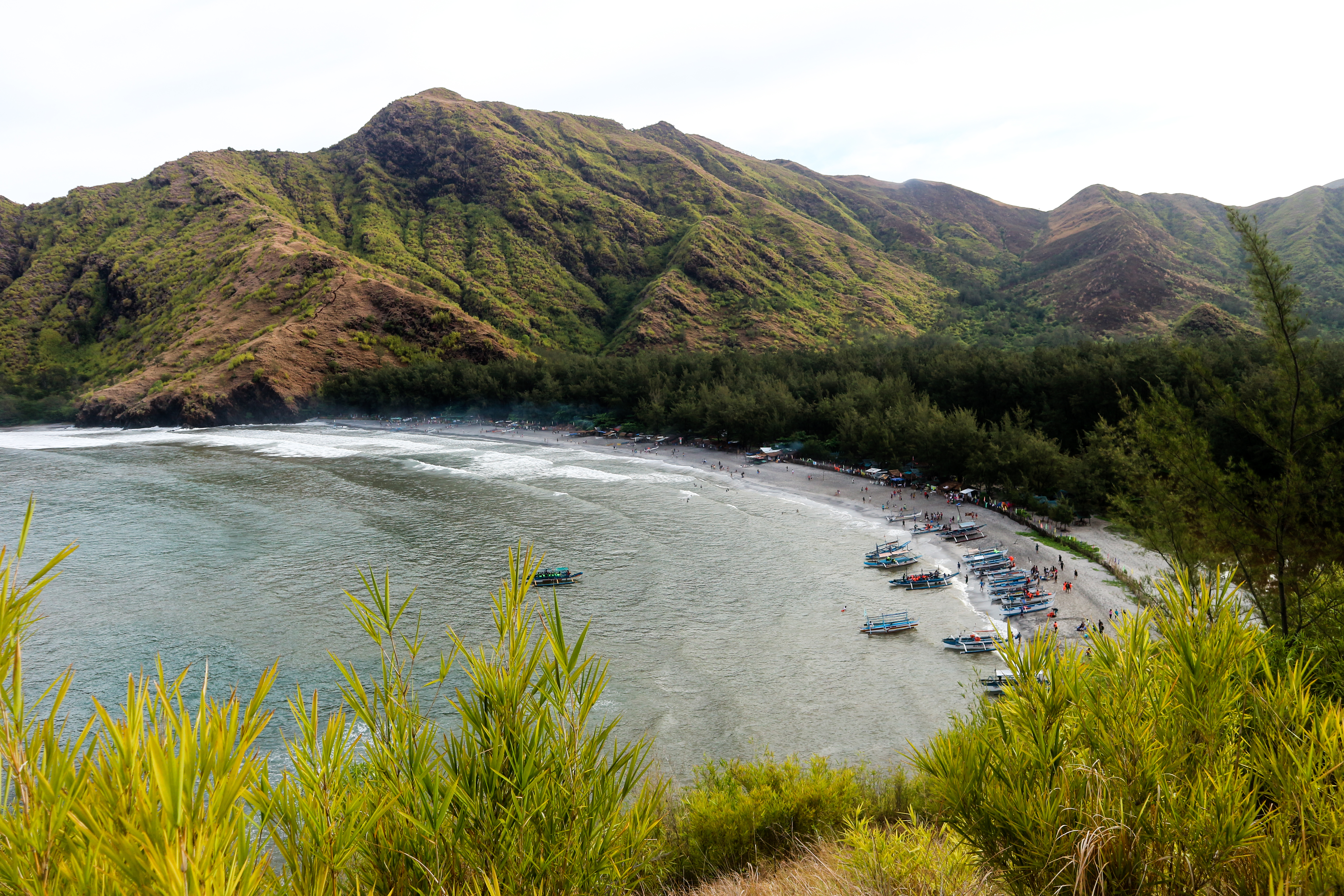
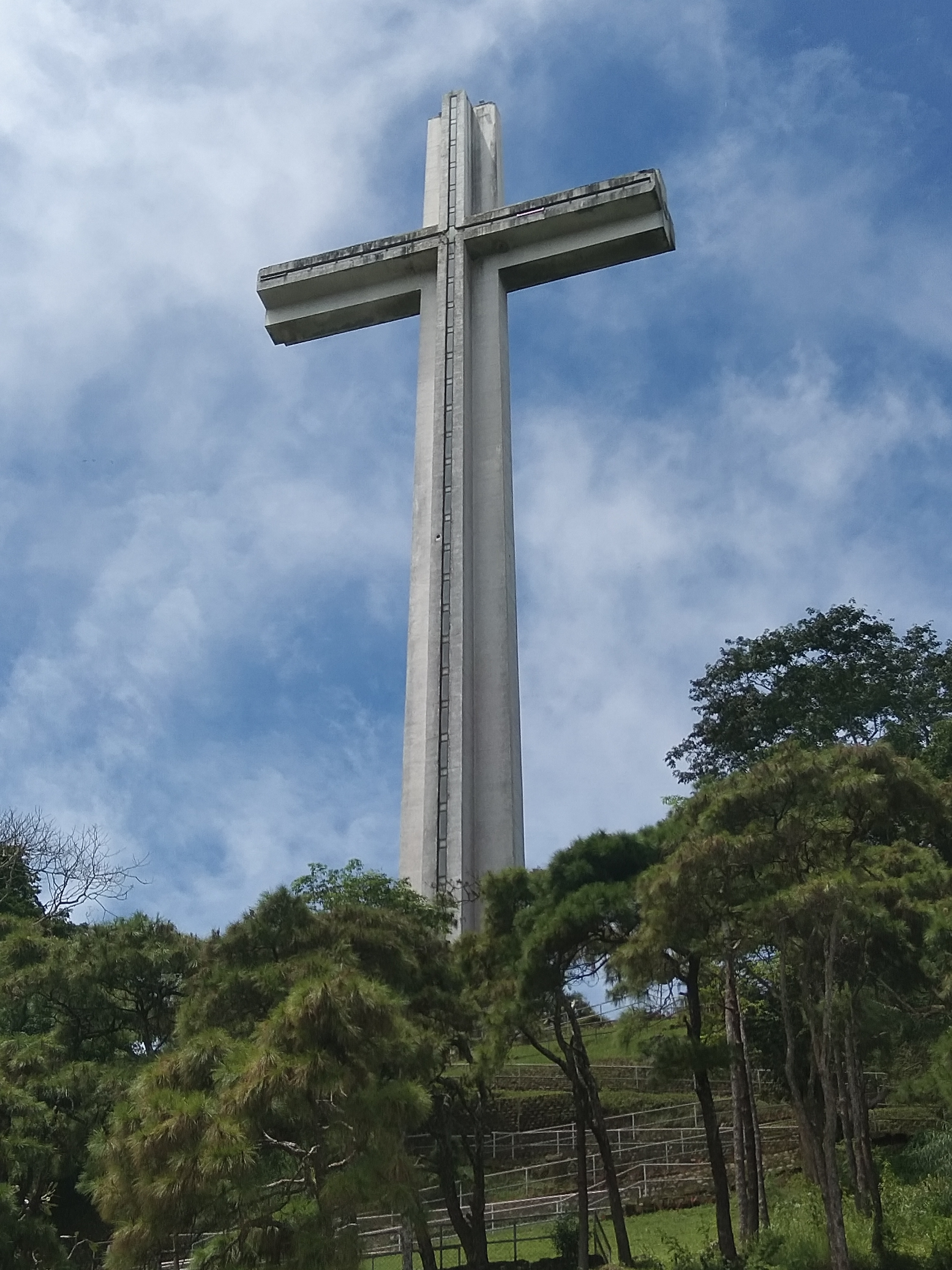
- Clockwise from the top: Lake Pinatubo, Capones Island, Mount Samat National Shrine, Anawangin Cove, Barasoain Church
- Nickname: Rice Granary of the Philippines
- Anthem: Awit ng Rehiyon III
- Location in the Philippines
- Interactive map of Central Luzon
- Coordinates: 15°28′N 120°45′E
- Country: Philippines
- Island group: Luzon
- Regional center: San Fernando (Pampanga)
- Largest city: San Jose del Monte

Area
  - Total: 22,014.63 km^{2} (8,499.90 sq mi)
- Highest elevation (Mount Tapulao): 2,037 m (6,683 ft)

Population (2024 census)
  - Total: 12,989,074
  - Density: 590.0201/km^{2} (1,528.145/sq mi)
  - Households: 3,040,488

Divisions
  - Provinces: 7: Aurora; Bataan; Bulacan; Nueva Ecija; Pampanga; Tarlac; Zambales
  - Independent cities: 2: Angeles; Olongapo
  - Component cities: 13: Balanga; Baliwag; Cabanatuan; Gapan; Mabalacat; Malolos; Meycauayan; Muñoz; Palayan; San Fernando; San Jose; San Jose del Monte; Tarlac City
  - Municipalities: 115
  - Barangays: 3,102
  - Districts: 20

Economy
  - Poverty incidence: 1.9% (2025)
  - GDP total: US$50.6 billion
  - GDP per capita: US$3,935
  - HDI (2023): 0.735 high · 3rd of 17
- Time zone: UTC+8 (PST)
- PSGC: 030000000
- ISO 3166 code: PH-03
- Electorate: 7,699,404 voters (2025)
- Languages: Tagalog; Ilocano; Kapampangan; Pangasinan; Sambal; English; others

Central Luzon (Tagalog: Gitnang Luzon; Kapampangan: Kalibudtarang Luzon; Sambal: Botlay a Luzon; Pangasinan: Pegley a Luzon; Ilocano: Tengnga a Luzon), designated as Region III, is an administrative region in the Philippines. The region comprises seven provinces: Aurora, Bataan, Bulacan, Nueva Ecija, Pampanga (with its capital, City of San Fernando serving as the regional center), Tarlac, and Zambales; the region also contains two highly urbanized cities, Angeles and Olongapo. San Jose del Monte is the most populous city in the region. The region contains the largest plain in the country and produces most of the country's rice supply, earning itself the nickname "Rice Granary of the Philippines". It is also the region to have the most number of provinces in the country.

== Etymology ==
The current name of the region refers to its position on the island of Luzon. The term was coined by American colonialists after the defeat of the First Philippine Republic. There have been proposals to rename the current Central Luzon region into the Luzones region. The proposed name is in reference to the old name of Luzon island, Luções, which was later used to refer to the central area of the island, stretching from Pangasinan in the north, all the way to Pampanga in the south. The term Luções literally translates into Luzones.

== History ==
=== Prehistoric and early historic eras ===
Among the competing models of migration to the Philippines, the general consensus is the earliest modern human migrations into the Philippine islands were during the Paleolithic, around 40,000 years ago, representing the people from whom the Aeta peoples have been believed by researchers to be descended. This was followed by two other migration waves between 25,000 and 12,000 years ago. The latest migration wave is associated with the Austronesian peoples, circa 7,000 years ago. Kapampangans, Sambal people and the Sinauna (lit. "those from the beginning"), originated in southern Luzon, where they made contact with the migrating Tagalog settlers, of which contact between the Kapampangans and Tagalogs was most intensive. After this, the original settlers moved northward: Kapampangans moved to modern Tondo, Navotas, Bulacan, Nueva Ecija, Aurora, Pampanga, south Tarlac, and east Bataan, and Sambals to the modern province of Zambales, in turn, displacing the Aetas. The flatlands of the southern portion of Upper Pampanga (now Nueva Ecija), was a hospitable place for these new Tagalog settlers between 300 and 200 B.C. Tagalogs from southern Luzon, most specifically Cavite, migrated to parts of Bataan. Aetas were displaced to the mountain areas by the end of the 16th century. Kapampangans settled Aurora alongside Aetas and Bugkalots. Pangasinan people are the native settlers in northwest area of Central Luzon; Igorot people, particularly Kalanguya, Isinay, and Bugkalot, are native residents in northern area of Central Luzon, precisely present-day Nueva Ecija, with the Bugkalots also live in northwest Aurora.

=== Colonial era ===
When the Spaniards arrived and settled the Philippines, Provincia de La Pampanga was established in the largest area of Central Luzon in 1571; portion of Central Luzon was made up of Pangasinán created in 1580. The next provinces that were created out of Pampanga were Bulacan and Zambales which were both established in 1578. Baler & Casiguran became part of Kalilayan, which included modern Nueva Ecija, until Kalilayan changed its name to Tayabas in 1749, taken from the town of the same name. Nueva Ecija was created as a military district or comandancia governed by Governor-General Fausto Cruzat y Góngora in 1701, but still part of Pampanga at that time. It included huge swathes of Central Luzon, the Contracosta towns, as well as the Kalilayan area and Polillo Islands. Contracosta was the Spanish colonial name for the towns on the east coast and included towns from Mauban, Binangonan de Lampon, to El Principe. Since Contracosta & Kalilayan were part of La Laguna province at that time before including them in Nueva Ecija, they became jointly ruled by La Pampanga & La Laguna provinces. Historian Cornelio Bascara documents that the province of Bataan was established on January 11, 1757, by Governor-General Pedro Manuel Arandia out of territories belonging to Pampanga and the corregimiento of Mariveles which, at that time, included Maragondon across Manila Bay. Tagalogs migrated to east Bataan, where Kapampangans assimilated to the Tagalogs. Kapampangans were displaced to the towns near Pampanga by that time, along with the Aetas.

When the polities of Tondo and Maynila fell due to the Spanish, the Tagalog-majority areas grew through Tagalog migrations in portions of Central Luzon and north Mimaropa as a Tagalog migration policy was implemented by Spain. This happened again when British occupation of Manila happened in 1762, when many Tagalog refugees from Manila and north areas of Cavite escaped to Bulacan and to neighboring Nueva Ecija, where the original Kapampangan settlers welcomed them; Bulacan and Nueva Ecija were natively Kapampangan when Spaniards arrived; majority of Kapampangans sold their lands to the newly arrived Tagalog settlers and others intermarried with and assimilated to the Tagalog, which made Bulacan and Nueva Ecija dominantly Tagalog, many of the Tagalog settlers arrived in Nueva Ecija directly from Bulacan; also, the sparsely populated valley of the Zambales region was later settled by migrants, largely from the Tagalog and Ilocos regions, leading to the assimilation of Sambals to the Tagalog and Ilocano settlers and to the modern decline in the Sambal identity and language. The same situation happened in modern Aurora, where it was repopulated by settlers from Tagalog and Ilocos regions, with other settlers from Cordillera and Isabela, and married with some Aeta and Bugkalots, this led to the assimilation of Kapampangans to the Tagalog settlers. Kapampangans were the native residents of the northwest areas of Nueva Ecija; Pangasinan settlers moved there during early years of Spanish territorial period until the Kapampangans assimilated to the Pangasinan settlers. In the 19th century, repopulation and rice and tobacco industries caused large numbers of Ilocano settlers to move and stay in north areas of Central Luzon (Tarlac, Nueva Ecija, and Aurora) and south central Zambales; they now made up the largest ethnic group in those areas. The Tagalog and Ilocano migrations and settlements made Tagalog the lingua franca of Central Luzon and Ilocano the lingua franca in north areas of the region and south central Zambales. Many Ilocano settlers became assimilated in the areas with the Kapampangan and Tagalog majority populations, adopting Kapampangan and Tagalog as their native language while speaking Ilocano as 2nd language. Ilocano migrations and settlements continued in modern Aurora and Nueva Ecija in U.S. territorial rule in 20th century; in Aurora, Ilocano settlers lived in Dingalan and Dipaculao.

On December 27, 1735, a dangerous storm struck Baler and a tsunami called tromba marina devastated the old town settlement then located in present Barrio Sabang. Among the survivors were the Angaras, Bihasas, Bitongs, Lumasacs, Carrascos, and Pobletes who swam to the nearby Ermita Hill. Bihasas are from Dumagat or Aeta origins and Lumasacs are descendants of Bugkalots. A new community appeared into what is now the Poblacion of Baler, leaving "Kinagunasan," the place of devastation. A mural depicting this wave can be found in the Museo de Baler in town.

When Rafael María de Aguilar y Ponce de León took over as governor-general of the Philippines, he decreed the separation of the military- district of Nueva Ecija from the province of Pampanga and became a regular province on April 25, 1801, including the town of Baler, acquired from Tayabas.

In 1818, Nueva Ecija annexed the towns of Palanan from Isabela, as well as Baler, Casiguran, Infanta (formerly called Binangonan de Lampon) and Polillo Islands from Tayabas, and Cagayan, Nueva Vizcaya, Quirino, and part of Rizal. In 1853, the new military district of Tayabas was separated from Nueva Ecija and included present-day Southern Quezon as well as present-day Aurora. In 1858, Binangonan de Lampon and the Polillo Islands were separated from Nueva Ecija to form part of Infanta. Between 1855 and 1885, El Principe was established as its own Military Comandancia under the rule of Nueva Ecija with its capital in Baler. In 1873, Tarlac was established and was created from south Pangasinan and north Pampanga; this is the last province to be created in Central Luzon.

In 1901, towns of Nueva Ecija, namely Balungao, Rosales, San Quintin and Umingan were annexed to the province of Pangasinan. On November 30, 1903, several municipalities from northern Zambales including Agno, Alaminos, Anda, Bani, Bolinao, Burgos, Dasol, Infanta and Mabini were ceded to Pangasinan by the American colonial government. These municipalities were a part of the homeland of the Sambal people who wanted to remain within the Zambales province. This 1903 colonial decision has yet to be reverted. The reason for transferring those towns from Nueva Ecija & Zambales to Pangasinan is because they were geographically further away from the capitals.

In 1902, the district of El Príncipe was separated from Nueva Ecija and transferred to the province of Tayabas (now Quezon). The northern area which is part of the modern Dilasag and area of modern Casiguran was part of Nueva Vizcaya and also transferred to Tayabas in 1905. In 1918, the area of modern Aurora north of Baler was transferred to the authority of Nueva Vizcaya, but returned to Tayabas in 1921 and in 1942, the entire present-day territory of Aurora was annexed from Tayabas to Nueva Ecija, and returned to Tayabas in 1945 until the time when Tayabas was renamed to Quezon in 1946.

=== World War II ===
Central Luzon featured prominently during World War II, becoming one of the earliest targets of Japanese attacks because of the presence of U.S. Military bases in the area, and also because General Douglas MacArthur's plans for responding to the invasion involved falling back to positions in Bataan in Central Luzon, as well as the island of Corregidor which is administered by Cavite province in Southern Luzon.

The hostilities of the war began with simultaneous attacks on Pearl Harbor and on Clark Field and also on a smaller fighter base at Iba, both in Central Luzon. The dates of those attacks are different, however, because they took place across different sides of the International Date Line.

Prior to the 1941 Japanese invasion, Bataan was a military reservation for the purpose of defending the fortress island of Corregidor. The US Army stored nearly 1,000,000 US gallons (3,800 m^{3}) of gasoline there, along with various munitions. At the southern tip of the peninsula the U.S. Navy had established a small base at the port of Mariveles.

Shortly after the Japanese Army invaded the country in December 1941, the combined US and Filipino forces were being gradually overrun and General Douglas MacArthur moved his troops to the Bataan Peninsula in an attempt to hold out until a relief force could be sent from the US. Japanese forces started a siege of the peninsula on January 7, 1942, and launched an all-out assault on April 3. The majority of the American and Filipino forces were compelled to surrender on April 9 and were forced to march more than 100 kilometers (62 mi) from Bataan to Capas, Tarlac, which became known as the Bataan Death March.

After the surrenders of Bataan and Corregidor, many who escaped the Japanese reorganized in the mountains as guerrillas still loyal to the U.S. Army Forces Far East (USAFFE). This included the group of Ramon Magsaysay in Zambales, which grew to a 10,000-man force by the end of the war; the 22,000-man group of Russell W. Volckmann which called itself the United States Army Forces in the Philippines - Northern Luzon; and Robert Lapham who commanded the 14,191 man group called the Luzon Guerrilla Army Forces; among others.

In March 1942, the Partido Komunista ng Pilipinas (PKP-1930, a predecessor of the current Communist Party of the Philippines) likewise led in the organization of a broad united front resistance to the Japanese occupation of the Philippines called Hukbong Mapagpalaya ng Bayan, (lit. 'People's Liberation Army'). The organization operated successfully in undermining the Japanese until the end of the war, after which they found themselves alienated by the victorious U.S. led allied forces, most of whom had already developed the anticommunist sentiment which would mark the beginning of the Cold War. The PKP-1930 would thus resolve to reconstitute the organization as the armed wing of their revolutionary party.

The battle plan of the allied efforts to liberate the Philippines from the Japanese called for invasion forces landing to the north and south of Manila, which would converge on the capital, which was the primary objective. This would mean that the Northern force, which landed in the Lingayen Gulf, would cross the Central Luzon plains to get to Manila.

Clark Air Base had a notable role in the Battle of Luzon on 23 January 1944, in that it was the first major point of resistance where the Japanese fought back against allied forces who had landed in Agoo, Lingayen, and other towns in along the gulf, a province north. Learning that there were Prisoners of War at risk of being murdered at a POW Camp in Cabanatuan, Nueva Ecija, 133 U.S. soldiers from the 6th Ranger Battalion and Alamo Scouts, and about 250–280 Filipino guerrillas were detached from the main spearhead to attempt to rescue the prisoners. The resulting attack on 30 January 1944 was highly successful, and is now popularly known as the "Raid at Cabanatuan." Meanwhile, the Battle at Clark Air Base lasted until the end of January, after which the allies pushed on towards Manila.

=== Postwar era ===
After the social and economic upheavals of the war and with government institutions still in their nascent form after the recognition of Philippine Independence by the international community, the first few decades after the end of the war were marked by dissatisfaction and social tension. In the largely agricultural context of Central Luzon those tensions tended to coalesce around the interrelated issues of land ownership, and the working conditions of agricultural workers.

The Filipino communist Hukbalahap guerrilla movement formed by the farmers of Central Luzon to fight the Japanese occupation, had found themselves sidelined by the new post-independence Philippine government which had taken up the fear of communist influence which marked the beginning of the cold war in the west. So they decided to extended their fight into a rebellion against the new government, only to be put down through a series of reforms and military victories by Defense Secretary, and later President, Ramon Magsaysay.

Ultimately more effective than those who took up arms were the numerous political and labor movements who kept working towards agricultural land reform and stronger labor rights, with laborers' and farmers' protests gathering enough steam that several Philippine presidents were forced to meet with them and then concede to their demands. Among the most successful of these were the Land Justice March of the political group known as the Filipino Agrarian Reform Movement (FARM), which intended to march from Tarlac to Malacañang in 1969, although President Marcos was forced to give in to their demands early, meeting them while they were still at Camp Servillano Aquino in Tarlac City itself.

=== Martial Law era ===
The beginning months of the 1970s marked a period of turmoil and change in the Philippines, particularly in Central Luzon. During his bid to be the first Philippine president to be re-elected for a second term, Ferdinand Marcos launched an unprecedented number of foreign debt-funded public works projects. This caused the Philippine economy took a sudden downwards turn known as the 1969 Philippine balance of payments crisis, which in turn led to a period of economic difficulty and a significant rise of social unrest. In central luzon, social tensions tended to coalesce around the presence of the two largest United States bases in the Philippines, the appropriation of lands for the creation of new industrial zones, and the interrelated issues of land ownership and the working conditions of agricultural workers.

With only a year left in his last constitutionally allowed term as president, Ferdinand Marcos placed the Philippines under Martial Law in September 1972 and thus retained the position for fourteen more years. This period in Philippine history is remembered for the Marcos administration's record of human rights abuses, particularly targeting political opponents, student activists, journalists, religious workers, farmers, and others who fought against the Marcos dictatorship.

Anyone who expressed opposition to Marcos was arrested, often without warrant, in an effort defense minister Juan Ponce Enrile would later admit was meant to "emasculate all the leaders in order to control the situation," among them Senator and Concepcion native Ninoy Aquino, whose assassination years later would galvanize the effort to oust Marcos. Since they were not charged with crimes, they were called "political detainees" instead of "prisoners." Camp Olivas in the City of San Fernando, Pampanga was designated as one of the four provincial camps to become a Regional Command for Detainees (RECAD) - designated "RECAD II" and housing detainees from Northern and Central Luzon. Other sites used as detention camps in central luzon included Camps Servillano Aquino and Camp Macabulos in Tarlac City. Detainees were subject to an extensive set of torture methods, while many others were never brought to the detention centers and were simply killed in unofficial "safehouses." Others were killed in various massacres, with prominent instances in Central Luzon including incidents in Talugtug, Nueva Ecija on January 3, 1982; Pulilan, Bulacan on June 21, 1982; and Gapan, Nueva Ecija on February 12, 1982.

It was also during Martial Law that construction on the Bataan Nuclear Power Plant began in Morong, in 1976, in a deal between the government and Westinghouse Electric brokered by Marcos crony Herminio Disini. The project was plagued with problems throughout construction, including location, welding, cabling, pipes and valves, permits, and kickbacks, as well as setbacks such as the decline of Marcos's influence due to bad health and PR fallout from the incident at the Three Mile Island nuclear reactor. A subsequent safety inquiry into the plant revealed over 4,000 defects. Another issue raised regarding it was the proximity of a major geological fault line and of the then-dormant Mount Pinatubo. By March 1975, Westinghouse's cost estimate ballooned so that the final cost was $2.2 Billion for a single reactor producing half the power of the original proposal. The power plant would eventually would be responsible to 10% of the country's external debt, despite never actually operating.

=== Contemporary history ===
A magnitude 7.7 1990 Luzon earthquake, caused widespread destruction across the region, shaking the foundations of local infrastructure and testing the limits of emergency response.

Less than a year later, the June 1991 eruption of Mount Pinatubo — the second-largest terrestrial eruption of the 20th century—devastated the region. It buried vast tracts of agricultural land in ash, choked river systems with lahar (volcanic mudflows), and displaced hundreds of thousands of people. The eruption forced the permanent closure of the U.S. Air Force base at Clark, which had been a massive economic engine for the region. This, combined with the destruction of the agricultural sector, left the region in a state of deep economic uncertainty.

In 2002, Central Luzon had the highest unemployment rate among all regions in the country at 11.3%.

== Geography ==
The region is located north of Manila, the nation's capital. Central Luzon, in addition to the neighboring province of Pangasinan, contains the largest plain in the Philippines with its agricultural plains accounting for about 40% of the geographical region's area. Bordering it are the regions of Ilocos and Cagayan Valley to the north; National Capital Region, Calabarzon and the waters of Manila Bay to the south; South China Sea to the west; and the Philippine Sea to the east. The only inland provinces are Nueva Ecija & Tarlac. Pangasinan is historico-culturally and geographically an integral part of this region, but was politically made part of the Ilocos Region by President Ferdinand Marcos on June 22, 1973.

There are fifteen cities in the region: Balanga in Bataan; Baliwag, Malolos, Meycauayan, and San Jose del Monte in Bulacan; Cabanatuan, Gapan, Muñoz, Palayan, and San Jose in Nueva Ecija; Angeles City, Mabalacat City, and City of San Fernando in Pampanga; Tarlac City in Tarlac; and Olongapo in Zambales. Central Luzon produces the most rice in the whole country. Excess rice is delivered and imported to other regions of the Philippines.

The City of San Fernando, the provincial capital of Pampanga, is designated as the regional center. Aurora was transferred from Region IV through Executive Order No. 103 in May 2002. Aurora was the sub-province created from the northern part of Quezon in 1951, named after Aurora Quezon. One obvious reason for creating the sub-province was the area's isolation from the rest of Quezon Province: there were no direct links to the rest of the province and much of the terrain was mountainous and heavily forested, which made the area relatively isolated, and its distance from Quezon's capital Lucena. On September 7, 1946, the Third Philippine Republic enacted Republic Act No. 14, which renamed the province of Tayabas to Quezon, in honor of Aurora's husband & cousin Manuel L. Quezon. Manuel was the second President of the Philippines and elected governor of Tayabas in 1906 and assemblyman of 1st district of Tayabas in 1907 and, along with his wife Aurora, were natives of Baler (now capital of Aurora), formerly one of the municipalities of Quezon Province. Aurora's total separation from Quezon Province and transfer to Central Luzon fulfilled the long-held wishes and prayers of its residents. For the first time since the Spanish occupation, the original municipalities of Baler and Casiguran achieved true independence from Quezon, while also reforming the historic La Pampanga region. The transfer of Aurora to Central Luzon opened the access of Central Luzon to Pacific Ocean. Many residents and government leaders of Aurora objected to the change, as Aurora maintains strong historical and cultural connections to the rest of Southern Tagalog, particularly Quezon Province, thus also of the memory of Manuel L. Quezon, and with that, Aurora residents self-identified with Quezon; but Aurora's transfer to Central Luzon means that geographically, the province is more accessible by land from Nueva Ecija and of course, San Fernando, Pampanga.

== Administrative divisions ==
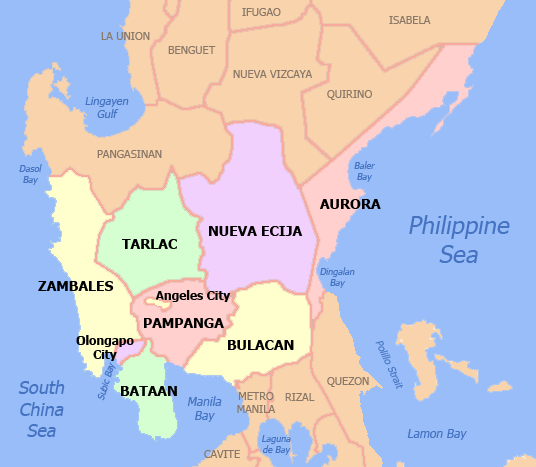
Political map of Central Luzon

=== Provinces ===
Central Luzon comprises 7 provinces, 2 highly urbanized cities, 12 component cities, 116 municipalities, 3,102 barangays

Province or HUC		Capital	Population (2020)		Area		Density		Cities	Muni.	Barangay
					km^{2}	sq mi	/km^{2}	/sq mi			
Aurora		Baler	1.9%	235,750	3,133.40	1,209.81	75	190	0	8	151
Bataan		Balanga	6.9%	853,373	1,372.98	530.11	620	1,600	1	11	237
Bulacan		Malolos	29.9%	3,708,890	2,783.69	1,074.79	1,300	3,400	3	21	569
Nueva Ecija		Palayan	18.6%	2,310,134	5,689.69	2,196.80	410	1,100	5	27	849
Pampanga		City of San Fernando	19.6%	2,437,709	2,001.22	772.68	1,200	3,100	2	19	505
Tarlac		Tarlac City	12.1%	1,503,456	3,053.60	1,179.00	490	1,300	1	17	511
Zambales		Iba	5.2%	649,615	3,645.83	1,407.66	180	470	0	13	230
Angeles City	†	—	3.7%	462,928	60.27	23.27	7,700	20,000	—	—	33
Olongapo	†	—	2.1%	260,317	185.00	71.43	1,400	3,600	—	—	17
Total				12,422,172	22,014.63	8,499.90	560	1,500	14	116	3,102
† Angeles and Olongapo are highly urbanized cities; figures are excluded from Pampanga and Zambales respectively.

==== Governors and vice governors ====
Province	Image	Governor	Political Party	Vice Governor
Aurora		Isidro P. Galban	LDP	Patrick Alexis Angara
Bataan		Jose Enriquez S. Garcia III	PFP	Ma. Cristina M. Garcia
Bulacan		Daniel R. Fernando (Cesar Fernando Ramirez)	NUP	Alex Castro
Nueva Ecija		Aurelio Umali	Sigaw	Gil Raymond M. Umali
Pampanga		Lilia G. Pineda	Kambilan	Dennis G. Pineda
Tarlac		Christian Tell A. Yap	SST	Estelita M. Aquino
Zambales		Hermogenes E. Ebdane, Jr.	SZP	Jacqueline Rose Khonghun

=== Cities ===
The Central Luzon Region has fifteen cities. San Jose del Monte is the city with the most population while Angeles City is the most densely populated city in the region. Tarlac City is the largest based on land area.

- † Regional center

City	Population (2020)	Area		Density		City class	Income class	Province
		km^{2}	sq mi	/km^{2}	/sq mi			
Angeles City	462,928	60.27	23.27	7,700	20,000	Highly Urbanized	1st	Pampanga
Balanga	104,173	111.63	43.10	930	2,400	Component	4th	Bataan
Baliwag	168,470	45.05	17.39	3,700	9,600	Component	2nd	Bulacan
Cabanatuan	327,325	192.29	74.24	1,700	4,400	Component	1st	Nueva Ecija
Gapan	122,968	164.44	63.49	750	1,900	Component	4th	Nueva Ecija
Mabalacat	293,244	83.18	32.12	3,500	9,100	Component	1st	Pampanga
Malolos	261,189	67.25	25.97	3,900	10,000	Component	1st	Bulacan
Meycauayan	225,673	32.10	12.39	7,000	18,000	Component	1st	Bulacan
Muñoz	84,308	163.05	62.95	520	1,300	Component	4th	Nueva Ecija
Olongapo	260,317	185.00	71.43	1,400	3,600	Highly Urbanized	1st	Zambales
Palayan	45,383	101.40	39.15	450	1,200	Component	5th	Nueva Ecija
† San Fernando	354,666	67.74	26.15	5,200	13,000	Component	1st	Pampanga
San Jose	150,917	185.99	71.81	810	2,100	Component	3rd	Nueva Ecija
San Jose del Monte	651,813	105.53	40.75	6,200	16,000	Component	1st	Bulacan
Tarlac City	385,398	274.66	106.05	1,400	3,600	Component	1st	Tarlac

== Demographics ==
Population census of Central Luzon
Year	Pop.	±% p.a.
1903	819,768	—
1918	1,044,631	+1.63%
1939	1,586,524	+2.01%
1948	1,860,274	+1.78%
1960	2,568,206	+2.72%
1970	3,695,955	+3.70%
1975	4,300,196	+3.08%
1980	4,909,938	+2.69%
1990	6,338,590	+2.59%
1995	7,092,191	+2.13%
2000	8,204,742	+3.17%
2007	9,709,177	+2.35%
2010	10,137,737	+1.58%
2015	11,218,177	+1.95%
2020	12,422,172	+2.17%
2024	12,989,074	+1.08%
Source: Philippine Statistics Authority

=== Languages ===
The native languages of Central Luzon are:

- Bugkalot, spoken in parts of Nueva Ecija and Aurora.
- Kapampangan, spoken in Pampanga and southern Tarlac, as well as southeastern Zambales, northeastern Bataan, western Bulacan, southwestern Nueva Ecija, and selected areas of Aurora.
- Casiguranin (Kasiguranin), spoken in parts of Aurora.
- Pangasinan, spoken in northern Tarlac, northeastern Zambales, and northwestern Nueva Ecija.
- Tagalog, spoken in Bulacan, Pampanga, Tarlac, Nueva Ecija, Aurora, Bataan, and Zambales. The most popular Tagalog dialect is in Bulacan which is also heard in Nueva Ecija; the Tagalog dialect spoken in Aurora is basically similar to Tayabas Tagalog of Quezon, President Manuel L. Quezon who is considered the Father of National Language because he chose Tagalog as the basis of national language was born and raised in Baler, Aurora. It is the regional lingua franca, mostly as Filipino.
- Ilocano, spoken in northern Nueva Ecija, north Tarlac, north Aurora, and some parts of Zambales. It is the main lingua franca in the northern areas.
- Sambal, spoken in some parts of Zambales.

The transfer of Aurora to Central Luzon added the population of Tagalog and Ilocano speakers along with Pangasinan and Kapampangan speakers in the region. Other native languages spoken in Central Luzon are Umiray Dumagat, Casiguran Dumagat, Palanan Dumagat, Northern Alta or Edimala in Aurora and Southern Alta or Alta Kabulowan in Bulacan and Dingalan, Aurora, and Tagabulós in Dingalan and San Luis, Aurora; other languages not native to Central Luzon but spoken by descendants of migrants there are Ga'dang, Kankanaey, and Isinay in Aurora, with the latter also spoken in Nueva Ecija.

=== Religion ===
Eighty percent of the population of Central Luzon is Roman Catholic. Other religions represented are Protestants (including Evangelicals), Islam, Iglesia ni Cristo comprised significant 5% adherence and Pampanga is the first ecclesiastical district of the Church, and indigenous Philippine folk religions. There are also other denominations such as Jesus Is Lord, Pentecostal Missionary Church of Christ, Ang Dating Daan, Jesus Miracle Crusade, United Methodist Church and others.

== Economy ==
Central Luzon has a gross regional domestic product (GRDP) of 2.19-trillion pesos. Bulacan and Pampanga accounted for more than half of the region's economy, with shares of 27.7 percent and 24.1 percent, respectively. Meanwhile, Nueva Ecija, Bataan, Tarlac, City of Angeles, Zambales, City of Olongapo, and Aurora had shares of 13.7 percent, 11.8 percent, 8.8 percent, 6.1 percent, 4.0 percent, 2.4 percent, and 1.5 percent, respectively.

PHP244.15 billion is the total value of Agriculture, forestry and fishing of Central Luzon, Nueva Ecija accounted for the biggest share of 32.7 percent. Meanwhile, Pampanga and Tarlac ranked second and third with 25.7 percent and 16.9 percent shares, respectively.

In terms of the total value of Industry in the region, which amounted to PHP929.66 billion, Bulacan contributed the most with 32.7 percent share. This was followed by Pampanga with 24.3 percent share and Bataan with 17.5 percent share.

Similarly, Bulacan had the biggest share to the PHP1.01 trillion total value of the region's Services with 26.9 percent. This was followed by Pampanga and Nueva Ecija with respective shares of 23.5 percent and 14.3 percent.

=== Poverty incidence ===
Poverty incidence of Central Luzon (%)

Source: Philippine Statistics Authority

== Gallery ==
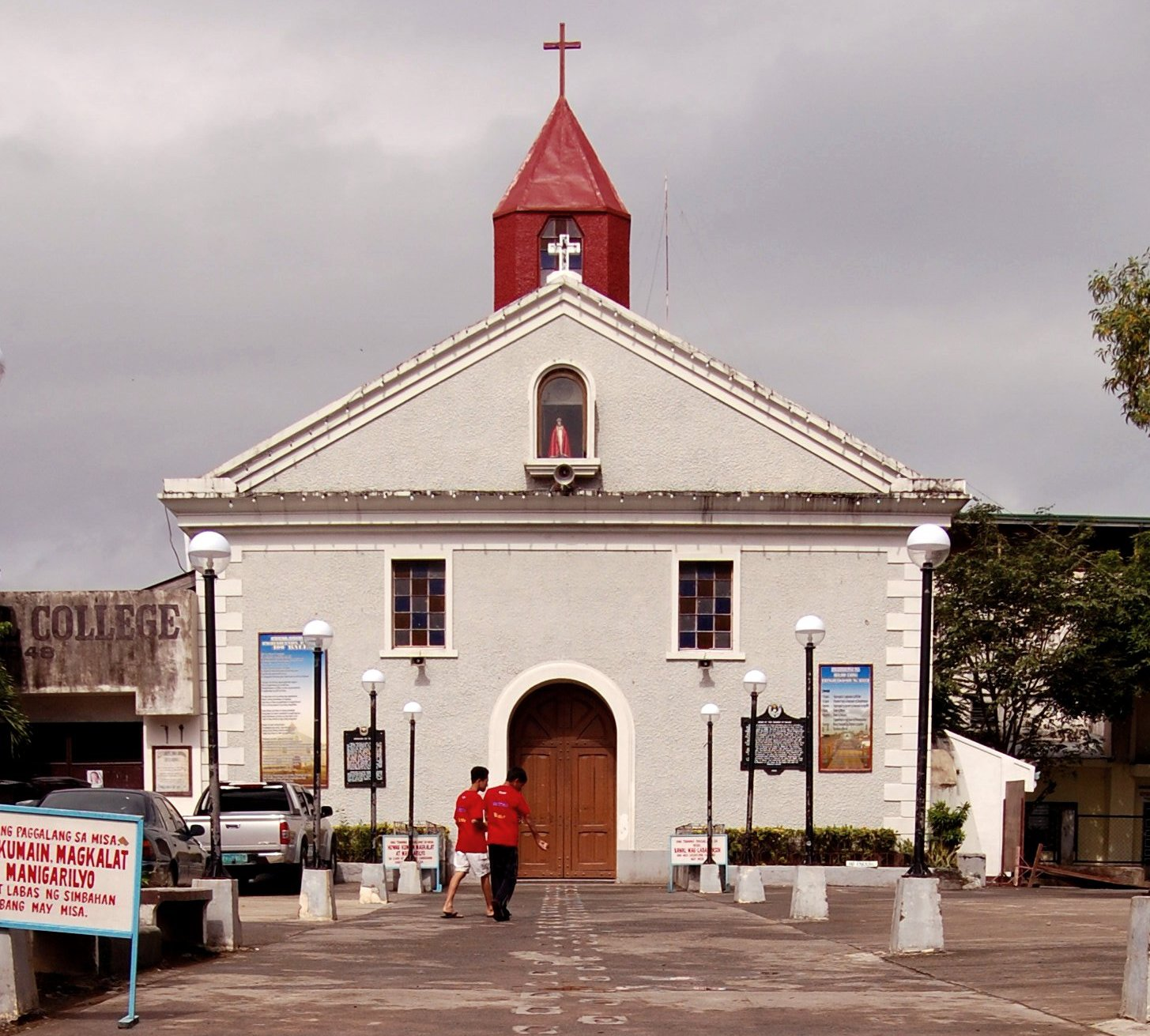
Baler, Aurora

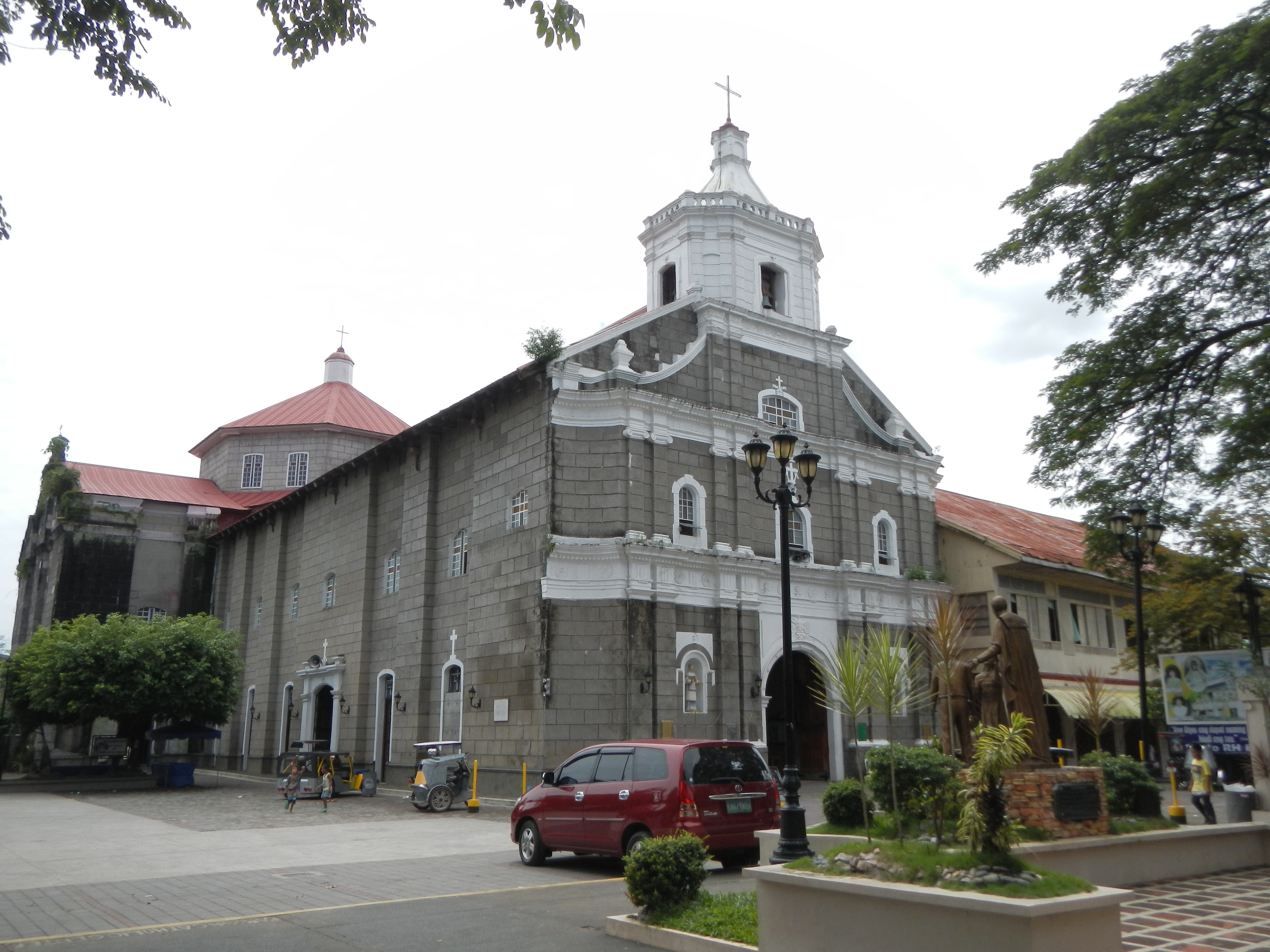
Gapan, Nueva Ecija

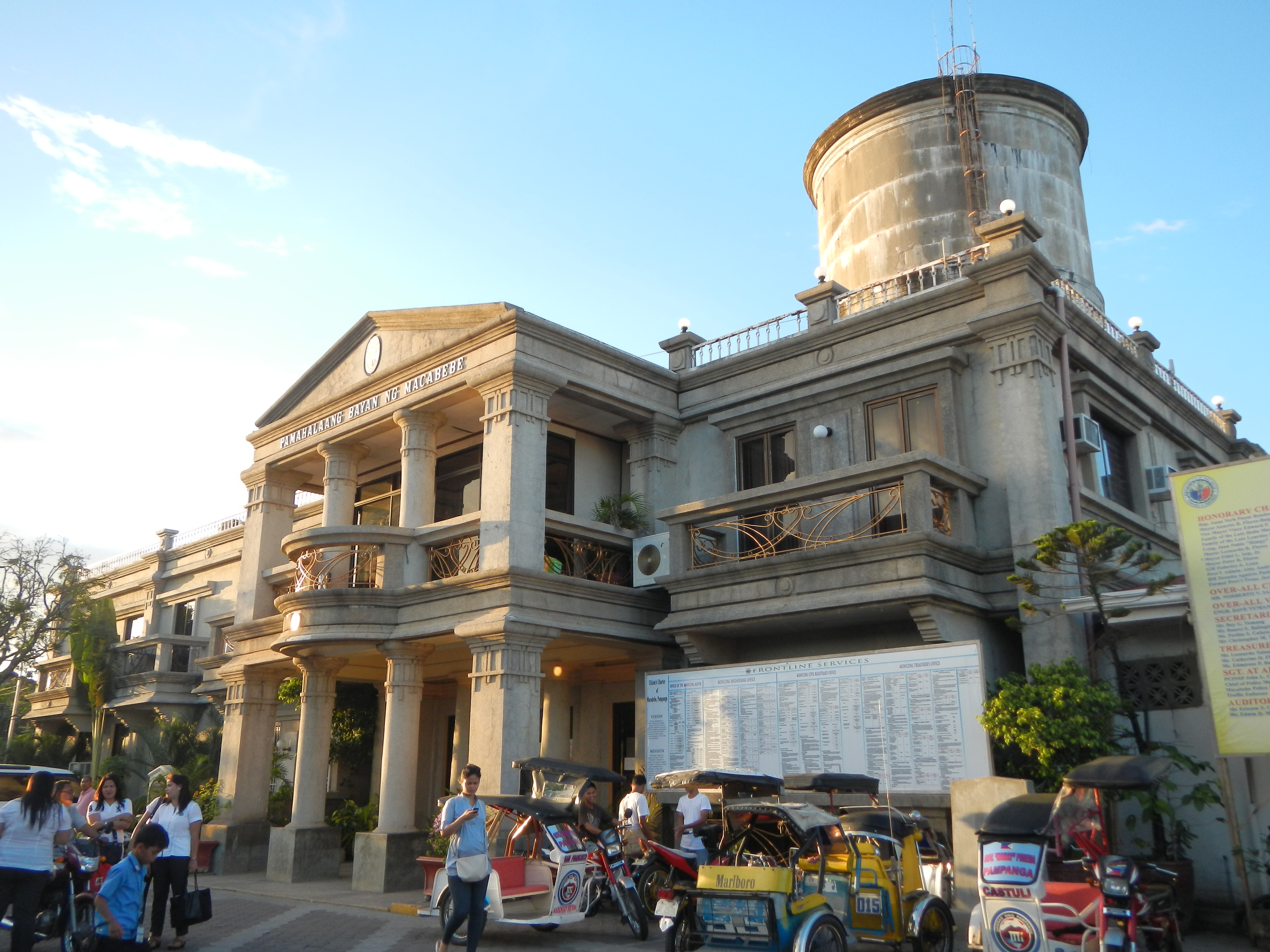
Macabebe, Pampanga

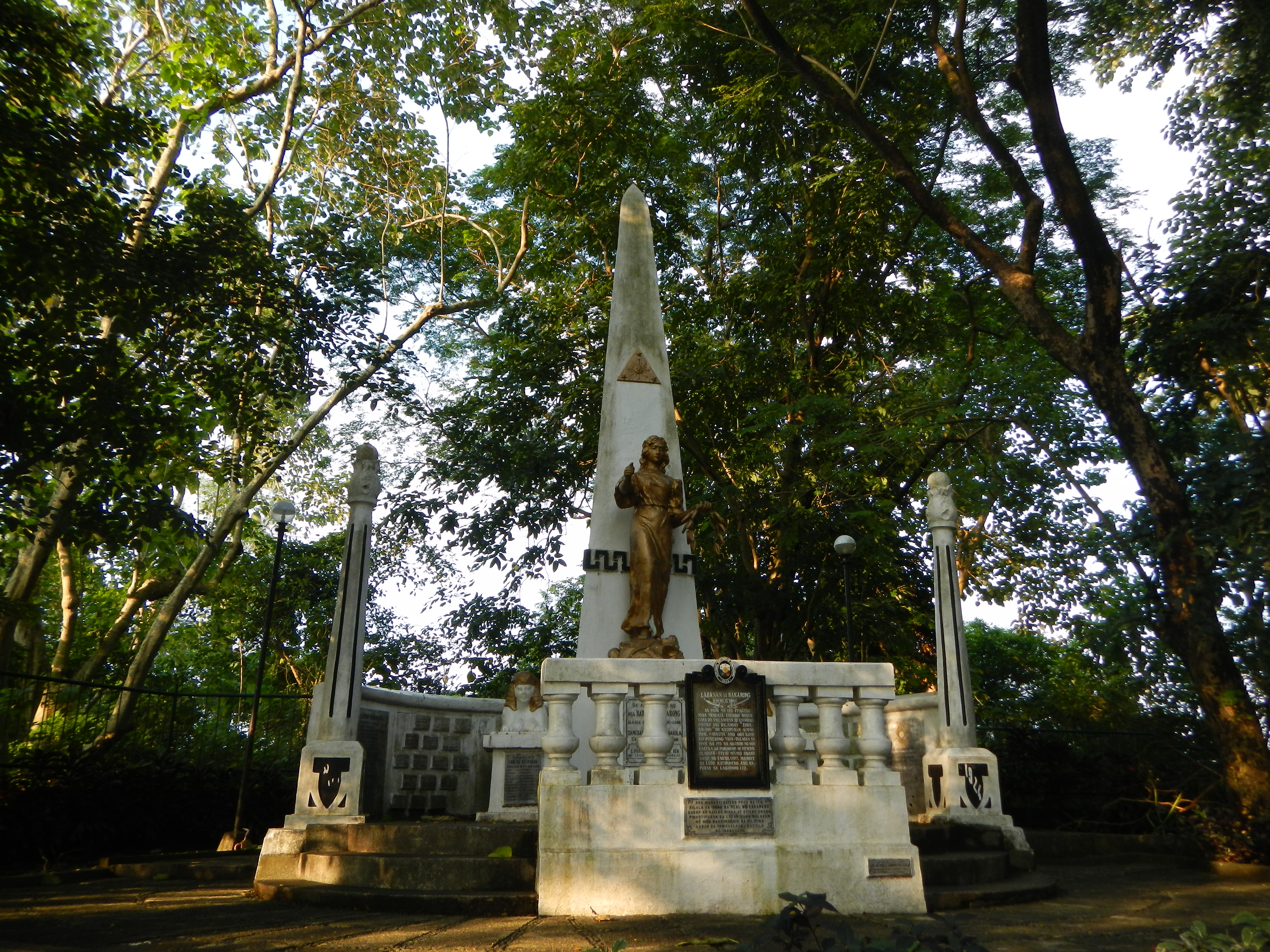
Pandi, Bulacan

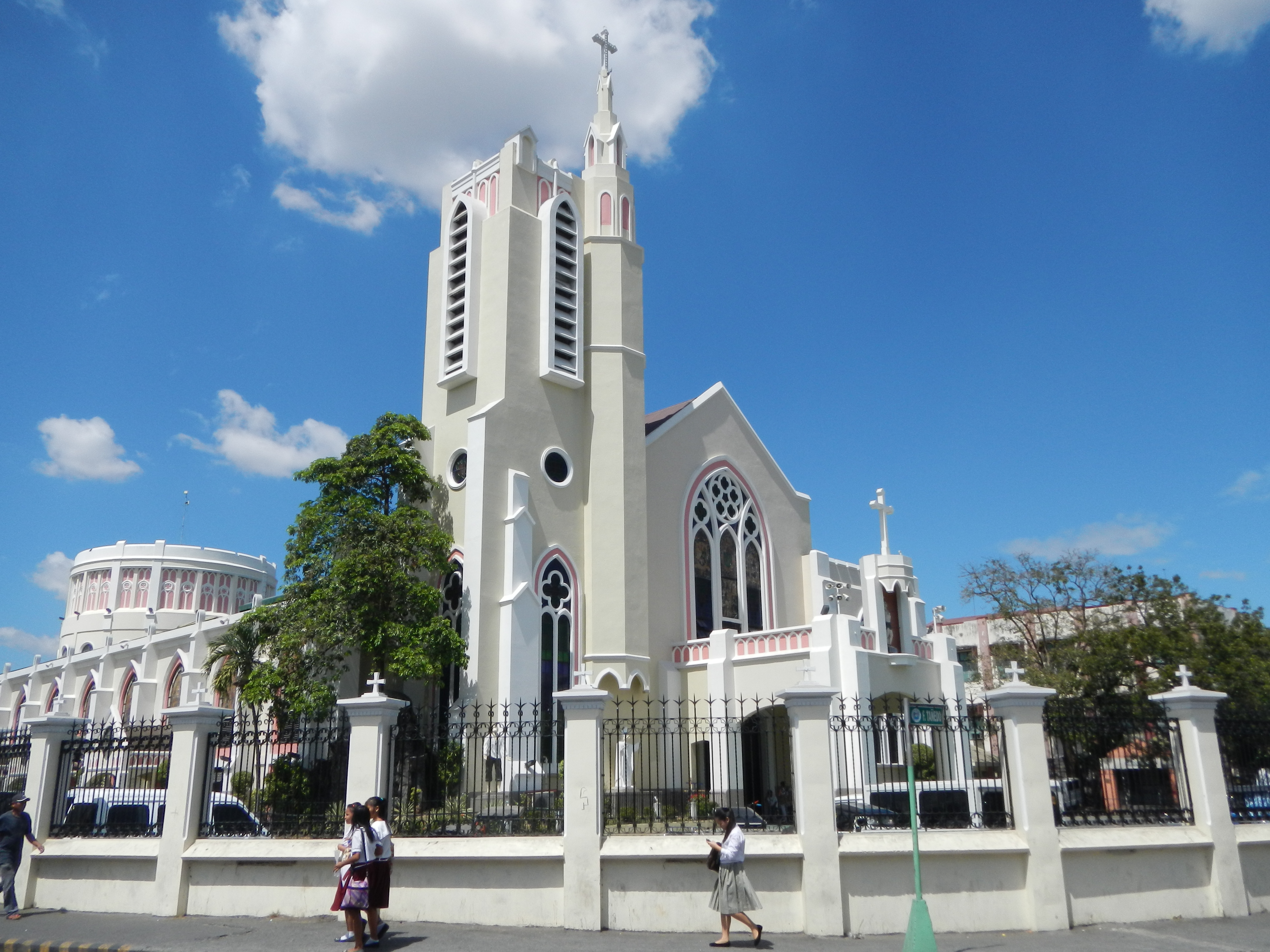
Tarlac City

== See also ==
- Super regions of the Philippines
- Philippine Revolution
