= 17th Infantry Battalion (Philippines) =

17th Infantry (Do or Die) Battalion
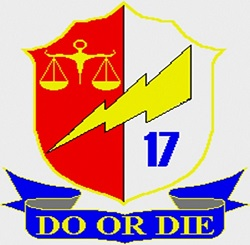
- Unit Seal of the 17th Infantry Battalion
- Active: October 16, 1972 - Present
- Country: Philippines
- Allegiance: Republic of the Philippines
- Branch: Philippine Army
- Type: Infantry Battalion
- Role: Conventional Warfare, Counter-guerrilla Operations, SAR and CSAR, Disaster Relief and Rehabilitation Operations, Civil-Military Operations and Civil-military Co-operations
- Size: 3 Infantry Companies and 1 Headquarters & Headquarters Service Company
- Part of: Under the 502nd Infantry Brigade
- Garrison/HQ: Brgy Bangag, Lal-lo, Cagayan
- Nickname: Do or Die Battalion
- Motto: "Do or Die"
- Anniversaries: 16 October

Commanders
- Current commander: LtCol. Ford G. Alsiyao, INF
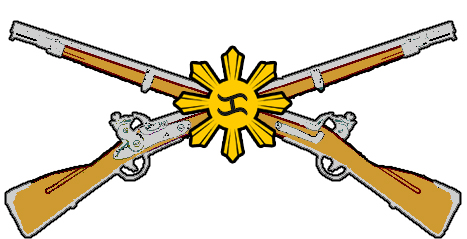
- Philippine Army Infantry Branch Insignia

17th Infantry (Do or Die) Battalion is currently located at Brgy Bangag, Lal-lo, Cagayan, and is operationally controlled by the 502nd Infantry Brigade of the 5th Infantry (Star) Division and presently covering the whole province of Cagayan and Apayao as its area of operation.

== History ==
The forerunner of the 17th Infantry Battalion prior to its activation was the 6th Infantry Battalion (Provisional) placed under the direct control and supervision of HPA as strike/reaction force of Greater Manila Area, commanded then by LTC Restituto C Padilla. The unit got its name “17IB” when it was formerly activated on 16 October 1972 pursuant to General Orders Number 173, GHQ, AFP and placed under the direct control of HPA. All personnel and equipment of 6IB (Provisional) remained intact with the newly activated 17IB. The burden of organization, orientation, equipage and deployment fell on the leadership of then LTC Edon Y Yap. He took pain in completing the battalion equipment and uplifted capabilities when it was fielded in Central Luzon. It was almost one year gaining substantial and impressive success in its pacification campaign in Central Luzon when it was ordered to be shifted to Southern Philippines specifically in Lanao where Charlie Company was airlifted ahead of the battalion as advance group but was recalled after two months due to a sudden change of tactical events and consideration.

When the command of 17IB was passed to LTC Mateo V Bawagan, the unit's administrative, operational and related activities were accelerated to its highest peak which earned COL Bawagan the honor of having been adjudged as “The Most Outstanding Battalion Commander of Calendar Year 1974”.

On 8 July 1975, LTC Nolan C Laput assumed leadership of 17IB to LTC Juanito P Allas. After four years and 20 days of productive pacification campaign in the province of Isabela and Cagayan, 17IB was pulled-out of the area on 16 March 1977 to undergo much needed respite and rest and recreation, orientation and retraining regarding new tactics and trends in the field of counter-insurgency warfare. After almost two months of retraining and reorientation, LTC Adelino V Magday took the command of the unit on 7 June 1977. Its new AOR covers the tri-boundaries of Pampanga, Zambales and the Peninsula of Bataan. The Battalion Command Post was initially established at Sta Lucia, Capaz, Tarlac but was later transferred to St Roosevelt at Dinalupihan, Bataan on 12 October 1977. MAJ Expedito S Sosa took command on 17th IB MIB following the untimely demise of LTC Adelino Magday in a vehicular ambush. The new Battalion Commander was recognized for its outstanding accomplishment and the Certificate of Merit from the Commanding General, then NORESCOM dated 1 October 1981 was awarded to the unit.

The stewardship of 17IB was passed to LTC John R Bautista on 1 October 1982 and after a year of fruitful administration; the command of 17IB was passed to LTC Raul L Marquez. With the assumption of its new Commander, a balanced administrative, operation and CMO plans and programs were formulated and simultaneously implemented based on Security Campaign Plan of RUC2 and in conformity with OPLAN “KATATAGAN”. The steadfast spirit and enthusiasm lives in every member of the unit thereby contributing to the gains in the counter-insurgency campaign. Foremost is the dismantling of well-fortified based camp of Regular na Puwersang Makilos (RPM) influenced barangays of Marag, Kakandungan and Kalabigan, all of Luna, Kalinga-Apayao. The prevailing situation of the populace paved way to the introduction of Army Literacy Patrol System (ALPS) in Villa Cielo, Buguey, Cagayan, one of the remote sitios of the unit's AOR, benefiting 200 students from the poor and under-privileged members of our society. As a result, the unit was bestowed the award as Best Unit in Administrative for CY-84 and from its ranks emerged the Most Outstanding EP of the Year.

The unit AOR was aggressively occupied starting 1 May 1986 when a new commander of the unit was designated in the person of MAJ Peter H Espadero. The redeployment of its forces was characterized by a series of major, minor and small unit strike operations of search and destroys. Come late June 1986, the maneuver companies established its bases in tactical locations supporting each other. During the third quarter of 1987, new AOR re-sectoring took place and so, the unit took responsibility over the towns of Claveria, Sanchez Mira, Pamplona and a portion of Abulog, Luna, Pudtol and Flora from the 54IB. Afterwards, the unit took responsibility over the municipalities of Lasam, Sto Nino, Piat, Tuao and Rizal, all of Cagayan from 21IB. Thus, the unit again maneuvered its line companies in identified strategic locations which later resulted to the dissolution of Delta Company, and its personnel were absorbed by Alpha Company and HHSVCo. During the fourth quarter, minor changes were undertaken pertaining to the location of battalion headquarters. In view of its necessity, the battalion headquarters was transferred to Allacapan, Cagayan.

The year 1987 proved to be fruitful to 17IB. The unit inspired by its successful outcome, SOT operation was pursued at Southwestern Allacapan and extended in Abulog resulting to the voluntary surrender of more than 1,600 Subversive Mass Activists (SMA). Importantly, in this undertaking where the destruction of enemy political infrastructure took cognizance in said areas and saw the decline of the CT propaganda operation, thus constricting the enemy and further leaving no room of influence for the CTs. In view of this, come May 1988, the AOR of the unit expanded to Eastern Cagayan pursuant to the 5ID Campaign Plan. As a result, Charlie Company was redeployed to Gonzaga, Cagayan as its new AOR.

The unit was adjudged by the NOLCOM as the “Best Battalion for CY 88-89” which was added to the shining laurels of glory and fame reaped by the unit. LTC Francisco V Fuentes assumed the command on 4 July 1989. Commitment of the unit was continued, headed by the incumbent Commanding Officer. MAJ Rogelio G Rosete took command on 20 December 1989, when the political problems spreading in the entire province of Cagayan, and even hostile activities of Ultra Rightist Group and the Aguinaldo Fiasco in Tuguegarao, Cagayan was left in the hands of the newly assigned Commander. Despite this political turmoil, the unit effectively performed its assigned task/mission and ably rebounded back. The unit completed its movements from Cagayan Province on 8 April 1990, to relieve-in-place the 65th IB in Ilocos Sur and Cagayan Province. It covered 17 municipalities of Ilocos Sur and two towns of Ilocos Norte. From 1 April 1990 to December 1990, four identified CT camps and temporary bases of the enemy were discovered, attacked and neutralized by the unit during the period.

Meanwhile, MAJ Cesar P Tiongson took over the command from MAJ Rosete in October 1990 when the unit was stationed at Banayoyo, Ilocos Sur. Its status however was OPCON to 503rd Brigade pursuant to Section II, General Orders Nr 351, H5ID dated 29 September 1991 until 16 December 1991 to occupy Nueva Vizcaya and Ifugao provinces in April 1991 the same date, the unit was placed OPCON to 503rd Brigade pursuant to Section III, General Orders Nr 430, H5ID dated 16 December 1991 in compliance to OPLAN “LANSAGIN DOS-TARABAY CHARLIE”. The unit headquarters with line companies moved from station in the province of Ifugao occupying Northeastern Cagayan, Calanasan, Conner and Kabugao of Kalinga-Apayao as its new AOR. During the stint in the area, numerous major and minor operations were conducted which resulted to 63 armed confrontations with the CTs and 12 CT camps were discovered and neutralized. At that point of time, noteworthy was the rating gained by the unit in all aspects of operations (combat/intelligence/CMO) that convinced higher headquarters to bestow upon the unit as 5ID, PA and NOLCOM Best Infantry Battalion for CY-92, respectively. The symbolic turn-over of command from LTC Tiongson to MAJ Emmanuel S Cayton transpired on 28 September 1993 with the same AOR.

Few months later, the unit AOR was expanded and covered the municipalities of Rizal, Sto Nino and Lasam, all of Cagayan with one hundred thirty 132 barangays in addition to new AOR. In continuation of what has been started, the unit conducted tactical offensive operations that led to the recovery of 70 HPFAs, 24 LPFAs, 113 anti-personnel/tank mines, numerous explosive paraphernalia and considerable war materials. These accomplishments include the legendary recovery of 57 HPFAs of the enemy on 29 August 1994 at Sitio Ilaw, Brgy Poguin, Conner, Kalinga-Apayao. The over untiring efforts of the unit paid-off as it dealt serious decimation and reduction among CT rank and file in the AOR, thereby destroying the CTs and impose image of invincibility and fluidity which eventually freed the hopeless people in the AOR from the clutches and influence of the dreadful CPP–NPA–NDF. Because of these accomplishments, the unit earned the distinct honor of being adjudged as the Presidential Streamer Awardee for CY-94.

On the later part of 1994, the 17IB was again given its new AOR in Isabela Province. On 29 October 1994, the unit left Buluan, Conner, Kalinga-Apayao and established its new battalion headquarters at Brgy Morado, Ilagan, Isabela relieving 21IB. Thereafter, the unit immediately deployed its line companies and continued its determined efforts in pursuit of the Army's mission to curb the remnants of the enemy in the region and contribute to the government's vision of lasting peace and suitable deployment by the year 2000.

On 7 July 1995, MAJ Pedro S Soria II took over the command of the unit. With the assumption of command of MAJ Soria, the unit further intensified its efforts in fulfilling the unit mission. Although the primary responsibility of ISO in the area was given to the PNP, the unit never ceases and became even more aggressive in its campaign against the remnants of the CPP-NPA. With efficient TRIAD application for CY-95, the unit gained/recovered several high powered and low powered firearms, anti-personnel mines and different enemy communication equipment and other war materials. Likewise, the effective SCF/ACCORD application in AOR resulted to the surface of 92 CT supporters and dismantling of two CT organizations all in the same year.

On 18 December 1996, MAJ Honorato S Delos Reyes (FA) PA assumed command covering the same AOR pursuant to Section II, General Orders Nr 638, H5ID dated 13 December 1996. The commitment of the unit was continued with the efficient application of TRIAD Concept. During MAJ Delos Reyes' incumbency, the unit spearheaded the first ever SRA-CIVAC in Gamu, Isabela held on 19–21 July 1997. This SRA-CIVAC was the basis for the subsequent Philippine Army Program which was later dubbed as the Community Assistance for Rural Empowerment through Social Services (CARES) Program. The program which benefited thousands of indigent individuals was so successful that it was conducted in other municipalities in Isabela namely: Burgos, Mallig and Delfin Albano before MAJ Delos Reyes' term ended.

On 16 May 1998, LTC Rufinito Y Cordova INF (GSC) PA became the Battalion Commander of the unit. He led the unit on its mission of preserving peace through the application of the TRIAD Concept and administrative matters. Under his leadership, the unit produced the most number of awardees in the field of combat. Eight personnel were awarded with the Gold Cross Medal for gallantry in action by LT General Raul S Urgello, Commanding General, Philippine Army on two separate occasions. The unit was also awarded Best Battalion for Operation, 3rd Quarter CY-98.

On 16 March 1999, LTC Gominto B Pirino INF (GSC) PA assumed command pursuant to Section II, General Orders Nr 75, H5ID dated 16 March 1999 covering the same Area of Operation (AO). Since the assumption of LTC Pirino, the unit conducted 18 battalion-size operations, 37 company-size operations, 979 platoon/small unit strike operations and six resource control operations that resulted to three unit-initiated encounters, killing of one amazon identified as “Silvia Tao-il”, wounding of one “Genevieve Pedro Dapay-os” and three other unidentified, capture of three “Exequiel Basilan Coloma, Francisco Licuanan and his wife Flor and the surrender of one “Joel Sumayen @Jun.

On 28 March 2000, MAJ Fernando B Felix (FA) PA assumed command pursuant to Section II, General Orders Nr 129, H5ID dated 22 March 2000 with the same AOR. During the tenure of the new Commanding Officer, the Battalion Headquarters was relocated from Brgy Gaddani, Tayum to Brgy Tagodtod, Lagangilang, both of Abra on 01 December 2001.

During his incumbency, the unit launched series of major and minor operations that resulted to the recovery of eight HPFAs, two LPFAs and the killing of one CT member Alias de Castro and the surrender of five CT elements namely: James Bautista @Joshua, Leo Maliongan @Yolan, Silvestre Y Garcia @Julius and Jay Donato Asbucat @Refie/Eugene.

At the peak of 2nd Quarter of 2001, LTC Juanito W Dalmas INF (GSC) PA assumed command effective 01 July 2001 relieving MAJ Felix pursuant to Section II, General Orders Nr 357, H5ID dated 07 June 2001. The unit continues to struggle on its assigned and mandated mission specifically on TRIAD Operations in the whole province of Abra, part of Ilocos Sur and eight municipalities of Southern Benguet including Baguio City.

During the early months of his term as battalion commander of the unit, the famous CT camp/training ground “Camp Venus” at Brgy Baluarte, Salcedo, Ilocos Sur was overrun and the capture of one CT member Joselito Baleva @Jon Jon, the political officer of SG II, SIR. The unit initiated 16 major operations, 52 company size operations, 1,044 platoon/small unit strike operations that resulted to the recovery of 10 HPFAs, four LPFAs, capture of Joselito Baleva @Jon Jon and voluntary surrender of seven CTs. The government troops initiated one encounter and overrunning/recovery/destruction of CT camp at vicinity Brgy Baluarte, Salcedo, Ilocos Sur.

The highlight of his incumbency was the processing and implementation of the second component of integration of CPLA to become CAFGU Active Auxiliary (CAA) members pursuant to Administrative Order #18 dated 27 September series of 2001 regarding CPLA Integration.

On 16 October 2002, the 21st battalion commander in the person of LTC Eduardo Q Gonzaga INF (GSC) PA assumed command of the 17th Infantry Battalion, 5ID, PA pursuant to General Orders Nr 445, H5ID, PA dated 30 September 2002 over LTC Dalmas with the same AOR.

During his reign as battalion commander of 17th Infantry (DO or DIE) Battalion, he was able to rule effectively in implementing Internal Security Operations (ISO) to the whole AOR. With his administration, the unit launched four Brigade-directed operations, 35 major operations, 62 minor operations, 270 platoon-size operations and 2,945 small unit/patrols. As a result, the unit gained seven HPFAs, the killing of two insurgents (BC) and neutralization of eight CT personalities, six belong to KLG CALVIN and the other two personalities were apprehended by the intelligence community in Baguio City known as @RHODA, Secretary of ICRC and @LOREN, the Political Officer.

Notable of which was an encounter between the operating troops and more or less seven CTs at Sitio Bawang, Brgy Alangtin, Tubo, Abra during the spate of Typhoon “Harurot” that resulted to the killing of two CTs (BC), recovery of two M14 rifles, one M16 rifle and voluminous subversive documents with high intelligence value on 221045 July 2003 while negative casualty on the government side.

On the field of Intelligence, the intelligence operatives were able to establish 45 Barangay Intelligence Nets (BIN) with 75 assets/informants recruited to enhance the intelligence efforts of the unit. Likewide, eight VIP security coverage were extended to VIPs visiting the unit's AOR and had conducted 16 security and inspections to vital installations. Remarkable in enemy personnel strength reduction was the apprehension of two prominent personalities of ICRC namely: Evelyn Cruz Bedana @Arceli Arciaga/Rhoda/Seles – the secretary and Josephine Gammad Perez @Eloisa/Piel/Loren – the Political Officer.

On Civil Military Operations (CMO), the unit deployed SOT Team at Sitio Tapayen, Brgy Alaoa, Tineg, Abra which created high impact developmental projects such as construction of barangay public toilets, waiting sheds, fences, gardening and renovation of barangay basketball court. The unit attended 16 Provincial Peace and Order Council (PPOC) meetings, 686 Municipal Peace and Order Council (MPOC) meetings and other conferences conducted in almost all of the municipalities within the AOR. Likewise, the unit conducted peace negotiations with the prevailing CPLA members, particularly the BALWEG and MOLINA factions. The processing and organization of Area Coordinating Council (ACC) provincial level as mandated in Executive Order Nr 21, series of 2001 as well as to the municipalities down to the barangay level. Also, the unit conducted a symposium held at Abra State Institute of Sciences and Technology (ASIST) in Lagangilang, Abra with the participation of more or less 1,000 high school and college students and the unit's involvement in medical mission with the Bethesda International Ministry held in the municipalities of Manabo, Sallapadan and San Quintin, all of Abra in February. On 15 January 2002, the unit initiated efforts in the signing of Peace Pact between the two rival barangays of Bacooc and Paganao, both of Lagangilang, Abra and the creation of the 1st Ilocano Bodong Federation (IBF) during its installation on 25 January 2003 with Ex-Mayor Ernesto Pacsa of San Isidro, Abra as the Founding Chairman.

From Brgy Tagodtod, Lagangilang, Abra, the unit started occupying its present camp base at Brgy Masin, Alcala, Cagayan on 24 November 2003. With the successful relieved-in-place with the 41st Infantry Battalion on 5 December 2003, the unit is tasked to revitalize and reinvigorate the Internal Security Operations (ISO) campaign to address effectively the insurgency situation in Cagayan and Northern Apayao. The new area of operation of 17IB covers 28 municipalities and one city of the province of Cagayan, five municipalities of Northern Apayao Province including six municipalities of Batanes Group of Islands.

The 17th Infantry Battalion under the leadership of LT COL Pablo L Liwan Jr INF (GSC) PA is employing TRIAD operations at the different priority target barangays/places within AO in coordination with the PNP to annihilate the remaining CTs in the AOR. The unit also assists Local Government Units (LGUs) and Local Government Agencies (LGAs) in the implementation of government programs that will benefit the people all over the AO and realize the vision of the Philippines towards a strong Republic.

On Intelligence, the unit through its intelligence operatives was able to establish 62 Barangay Intelligence Nets (BIN) with 145 assets/informants recruited to enhance the intelligence efforts of the unit and was able to collect 80 information. Likewise, the unit also extended 12 security coverage to VIPs visiting the unit's area of operation and has conducted 10 security surveys and inspections to vital installations.

For the period from 1 April 2004 to 14 April 2005, the unit participated in three Brigade-directed operations, 24 battalion-size operations, 108 company-size operations, 226 platoon-size operations, 1,149 small unit/strike operations, 84 resource control operations and conducted three VIP security operations.

The conduct of sustained combat operations resulted to five encounters as follows: Encounter against more or less nine communist terrorists by the operating troops of 17IB, MIG2, RIID, PRO2, DIU and Cagayan PPO at Brgy Calaoagan, Piat, Cagayan on 021320 April 2004 which resulted to the capture of Christina Miguel Garcia @Senyang, Secretary of Northern Front, CVRC, Lolito Raza @Lanlan, Manny de Guzman @Dekdek and Flordeliza Welba @Elyan. The encounter with eight CTs and two amazons at So Socsoc, Agaman Norte, Baggao, Cagayan by the troops of Charlie Company, 17IB under LT Tubera that resulted to the recovery of subversive documents with high intelligence value. This followed by another encounter with the same troops on 181600 June 2004 at vicinity So Sacaran, Tanglagan, Gattaran, Cagayan that resulted to the capture of CT Dennis Cabrera, member of SYP1, SECOM 2 and recovery of subversive documents. A fifteen-minute firefight on 101130 July 2004 by the troops of “A” Coy, 17IB under 2LT ARCILLAS against more or less seven bandits/other criminal elements at Sitio Mangisit, Salvacion, Luna, Apayao that resulted to the rescue of more or less 130 hostages and recovery of 32 trucks and one homemade shotgun from the bandits.

The unit also discovered enemy encampment/training ground at vicinity Sitio Gagaowan, Brgy Tanglagan, Gattaran, Cagayan on 161200 August 2004 by the operating troops of “A” Company under 2LT ARCILLAS and troops of 5IDRC under 1LT MADICLUM. The training camp is composed of twenty-five bunkers, three outposts and one hall utilized by the CTs as training ground. The unit also conducted aerial recon in the area of operation through deception by which simultaneously conducted during the conduct of relief operations in Apayao on 30 June to 2 July 2004 to be used in deriving new techniques, tactics and procedures for future combat operations. The unit conducted two SOT operations at Zinundungan Valley Complex (Brgys San Juan and Masi, both of Rizal, Cagayan) and one SOT operation at Balanni-Lipatan Complex (Brgy Balanni, Sto Nino, Cagayan).

A swift rescue and pursuit operation to the ambush of the municipal treasurer of Calanasan, Apayao, Mrs Rosalita Batil and four other companions by the undetermined number of armed men at Sta Elena, Calanasan, Apayao which led to the wounding of the victims and the robbery of more or less one million pesos and the recovery of one M16 rifle. The intensified pursuit operation resulted to the capture of the members identified as Benito Lara and Jaime Balabay Daguio.

On Civil Military Operations, since 1 January 2004 to 14 April 2005, the unit conducted four MEDCAP in Calanasan, Apayao and at Brgys Bural and San Juan, both of Rizal and Brgy Balanni, Sto Nino, all of Cagayan benefiting the less fortunate residents. Conducted rescue operations that resulted to the rescue of 380 civilian flashflood victims of Brgys Damurog, Baculod, Pared and Pinupok, all of Alcala, Cagayan due to Tropical Storm “IGME”. More or less 100 civilians were also successfully rescued on the hostage taking by the group of lawless elements believed to be bandits at Sitio Mangisit, Brgy Salvacion, Luna, Apayao on 08-10 July 2004. Likewise, the unit also conducted numerous dialogues/pulong-pulong and symposia within the unit's area of operation.

On 15 April 2005, LTC Paul Pompeyo M Dario Jr INF (GSC) PA assumed the position of battalion commander.

On 24 June 2006, Lieutenant Colonel Jacinto R. Bareng, FA (GSC), PA, assumed command of the battalion. In July 2006, the unit underwent battalion retraining at the 5th Division Training Unit, temporarily transferring responsibility for its former operational area in Cagayan and Apayao to Task Force Amiya. Following the completion of retraining, the battalion returned to the area on 8 October 2006 to conduct operations against the Northern Front formations of the New People's Army (NPA).

During Bareng's command, the battalion conducted four brigade-directed operations, 22 battalion-level operations, 22 company-initiated operations and 104 platoon-level operations, alongside 2,309 smaller operations and 231 resource-control operations. According to the Army's account, these activities resulted in 14 armed engagements, in which 11 insurgents were killed, seven wounded and two captured. The unit also reported recovering nine high-powered firearms, 15 low-powered firearms, 15 improvised explosive devices and communications equipment from five insurgent encampments. Its security operations also reportedly contributed to the surrender of eight NPA regulars, 33 members of the Militia ng Bayan and 175 individuals described by the Army as subversive mass activists, alongside 597 supporters and sympathisers.

The battalion also conducted civil-military activities, including community dialogues, educational programmes, medical outreach, blood donation drives and participation in inter-agency peace and order councils. Its environmental initiatives included the confiscation of 32,500 board feet of prohibited timber and the planting of approximately 56,000 trees. During Bareng's tenure, personnel received promotions and military awards, while the unit undertook infrastructure improvements and acquired communications, information technology and mobility equipment. The battalion also received four civilian awards recognising its community initiatives and peace-related activities in Cagayan and Apayao.

On 2 July 2008, Lieutenant Colonel James B. Joven, INF (GSC), PA, assumed command of the battalion as its 25th commanding officer. During his tenure, the battalion conducted extensive counterinsurgency operations in Cagayan and surrounding areas, including seven brigade-directed operations, 25 battalion-level operations, 31 company-initiated operations and 90 platoon-initiated operations. These operations resulted in the discovery of seven insurgent encampments, nine armed engagements, the death of communist insurgent Edwin Bilag, the capture of another insurgent, Ferdinand Bautista, and the surrender of 21 insurgents described by the Army as senior members of the communist movement. The unit also reported recovering firearms, improvised explosive devices, communications equipment and intelligence documents, while conducting operations that resulted in the confiscation of 24,339 board feet of illegally harvested timber.

Joven also oversaw intelligence, civil-military and community engagement activities. These included security operations for visiting officials, peace dialogues, public information campaigns and a province-wide peace rally in Tuguegarao City, which reportedly attracted approximately 25,000 participants. The battalion also conducted medical and dental outreach programmes, blood donation drives, environmental awareness activities and community development projects. Among its infrastructure initiatives was the opening of the Zinundungan Road, which was intended to improve access to communities in the Zinundungan Valley. During his command, the unit also reported improvements in personnel training, promotions, decorations, facilities and operational equipment.

On 17 August 2009, Lieutenant Colonel Laurence E. Mina, INF (GSC), assumed command of the battalion as its 26th commanding officer. During his tenure, the unit conducted counterinsurgency operations and operations against illegal activities and criminality in Cagayan Province, five municipalities of Lower Apayao, and the Batanes Islands. In recognition of its performance in combat, intelligence and civil-military operations, the battalion was named Best Infantry Battalion of the 5th Infantry Division and Northern Luzon Command for 2010. It also placed 15th among infantry battalions across the Philippine Army that year..

On 1 September 2011, LTC Alvin V Flores INF (GSC) PA took command of the unit and followed the tone set up by his predecessor. With his sterling leadership, the unit was able to inflict several setbacks for the insurgents being confronted by the unit in its area of operations. Unit combat operations accounted for eight armed engagements against groups of enemies that resulted to six enemies killed and the capture of three others. Among those enemies killed was CTL Dominador Javier @ BOBBING/MARTIN, staff member of Samahang Partido sa Platun (SPP) Cagayan who was neutralized during an encounter at San Miguel, Baggao, Cagayan on 27 October 2011. These armed engagements also resulted to the recovery of six high powered and two low-powered FAs; 12 IEDs; one PC Laptop with printer, external drive, USB modem and two memory card readers; three cellular phones with seven sim cards; a 250-pound general-purpose bomb; hand grenade; bandolier with 10 long and 3 short magazines for M16 rifle; different ammunitions; one Honda generator; numerous blasting caps, wires, command detonating switches, triggering devices and batteries; assorted electrical accessories; and various subversive documents containing high intelligence value. On intelligence and counter-intelligence, the unit launched numerous intelligence operations that resulted to the surrender of 16 and apprehension of one enemy personality and the recovery of two HPFAs.

On 17 June 2012, the troops of Charlie Company under 1LT BALAJADIA encountered at Cabatacan, Lasam, Cagayan, which resulted to the recovery of four improvised explosive devices (IEDs), 22 pieces blasting caps, one roll detonating cord, one command detonating switch, one hand grenade, bandoleer with two magazines for M16, one piece 40mm ammo, 24 pieces 5.56mm ammos, different kinds of medicines, subversive documents and personal belongings.

On 20 March 2012, the troops of Bravo company under 1LT Dela Cruz and the squad under Tsg Barangay encountered at Brgy Aridowen, Sta teresita, Cagayan which resulted to the two body count on enemy side, recovery of two M16 rifle (Colt) and subversive documents. In line with AFP Campaign Plan BAYANIHAN, the unit actively mobilized other stakeholders for the fast delivery of needed basic services in the far flung and upland communities and facilitated various outreach and civic action programs benefiting the general public thru the conduct of 27 medical and dental services; two Bike for Peace activities; regular participation in “BRIGADA ESKWELA” campaign of DepED in 33 schools; conduct of 14 gift-giving activities thru “PAMASKONG HANDOG” during yuletide seasons, 19 feeding missions and two disaster relief and rescue operations (DRRO). Moreover, fifteen thousand cubic centimeters (15,000cc) of blood were donated in different blood-letting activities. Through these civic oriented activities, the unit was given a plaque of appreciation by the Pugad Lawin Philippines Incorporated, Tuguegarao Chapter. Different and various sports paraphernalia and equipment were also procured to be used by all personnel of the unit and their dependents. It was also during LTC Flores’ stint that the 17IB Multi-Purpose Cooperative with an estimated asset of one million as of 1 December 2012 was formally organized and registered at the Cooperative Development Authority of the Philippines. On 1 April to 13 June 2013, the unit undertook Battalion Retraining at Kalinga Hostel, Bulanao, Tabuk City Kalinga and upon completion of the said training, the unit was given a new area of operation consisting the provinces of Apayao and Kalinga.

The 17th Infantry (Do or Die) Battalion continues to perform at the highest level thru the leadership of its new Commanding Officer, LTC Resurrecion C Mariano INF (GSC) PA, who succeeded LTC Flores on 16 October 2013. Considering its mountainous and vast area of operations, the unit at the moment does its best in performing its mandated mission utilizing only its two front sub-units, the Bravo and Charlie Companies. Alpha Company of the unit was augmented CENTCOM and currently placed OPCON to the Force Protection Task Force mandated to conduct Humanitarian Assistance and Disaster Relief operations in central Visayas Region which was devastated by super typhoon Yolanda.

== Unit awards ==
1. Certificate of Merit Calendar Year 1981 – for outstanding and effective mass based operator of NORESCOM
2. Best Unit in Administration Calendar Year 1984
3. NOLCOM Best Maneuver Battalion Calendar Year 1988–89
4. Command Plaque as Best Infantry Battalion of 5th Infantry Division, Philippine Army Calendar Year 1991
5. Philippine Army Best Maneuver Battalion Calendar Year 1993
6. Plaque of Merit Calendar Year 1993 - in recognition of its meritorious combat accomplishment
7. Award of the Presidential Streamer Calendar Year 1994
8. Best Infantry Battalion of 5th Infantry Division, Philippine Army – 3RD Quarter Calendar Year 1998
9. Best Infantry Battalion of 5th Infantry Division, Philippine Army – Calendar Year 2010
10. NOLCOM Best Infantry Battalion calendar Year – 2010

== Lineage of commanders of the “DO or DIE” Battalion ==
Name of commanders	Date assigned	Date relieved
LTC Restituto C Padilla	16 October 1972	16 October 1972
LTC Edon Y Yap	17 October 1972	2 November 1973
LTC Mateo V Bawagan	3 November 1973	7 July 1975
LTC Nolan C Laput	8 July 1975	5 June 1977
LTC Juanito P Allas	5 June 1977	6 June 1979
LTC Adelino V Magday	7 June 1979	21 May 1981
LTC Expedito S Sosa	22 May 1981	31 May 1982
LTC John R Bautista	1 October 1982	2 October 1983
LTC Raul L Marquez	3 October 1983	30 April 1986
LTC Peter H Espadero	1 May 1986	3 July 1989
LTC Francisco V Fuentes	4 July 1989	20 December 1989
MAJ Rogelio C Rosete	20 December 1989	15 October 1990
LTC Cesar P Tiongson	16 October 1990	27 September 1993
LTC Emanuel S Cayton	28 September 1993	6 July 1995
MAJ Pedro S Soria II	7 July 1995	17 December 1996
MAJ Honorato S Delos Reyes	18 December 1996	15 May 1998
LTC Rufinito Y Cordova	16 May 1998	15 March 1999
LTC Gominto B Pirino	16 March 1999	25 March 2000
MAJ Fernando B Felix	28 March 2000	30 June 2001
LTC Juanito W Dalmas	1 July 2001	15 October 2002
LTC Eduardo Q Gonzaga	16 October 2002	18 November 2003
LTC Pablo L Liwan Jr	19 November 2003	14 April 2005
LTC Paul Pompeyo M Dario	15 April 2005	23 June 2006
LTC Jacinto R Bareng	24 June 2006	1 July 2008
LTC James B Joven	2 July 2008	16 August 2009
LTC Laurence E Mina	17 August 2009	1 September 2011
LTC Alvin V Flores	2 September 2011	16 October 2013
LTC Resurrecion C Mariano	17 October 2013	To Date
