= Eduardo Oban =

Filipino government official and retired air force general

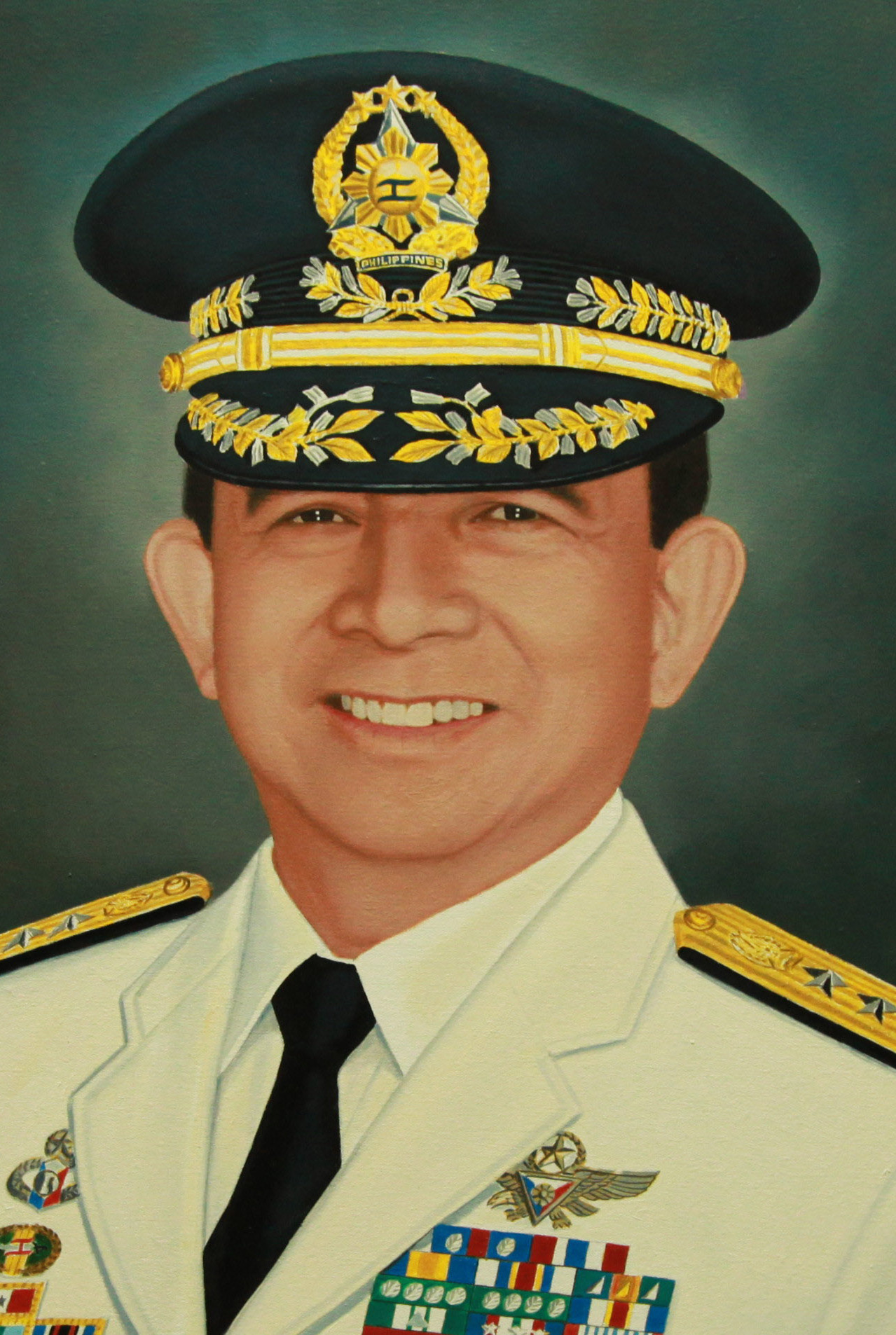
- Gen Eduardo SL Oban Jr AFP

National Security Adviser
- Incumbent
- Assumed office April 15, 2026
- President: Bongbong Marcos
- Preceded by: Eduardo Año

42nd Chief of Staff of the Armed Forces of the Philippines
- In office March 8, 2011 – December 12, 2011
- President: Benigno Aquino III
- Preceded by: Gen. Ricardo David
- Succeeded by: Gen. Jessie Dellosa

Personal details
- Born: Eduardo San Lorenzo Oban Jr. December 13, 1955 (age 70) Castilla, Sorsogon, Philippines
- Education: Philippine Military Academy; University of Asia and the Pacific (MBE)

Military service
- Allegiance: Republic of the Philippines
- Branch/service: Philippine Air Force
- Rank: General
- Commands: Chief of Staff of the Armed Forces of the Philippines; Deputy Chief of Staff of the Armed Forces of the Philippines; Vice Commander of the Philippine Air Force; Deputy Chief of Staff for Plans, J5; 1st Air Division; Air Defense Wing

Eduardo San Lorenzo Oban Jr. (born 13 December 1955) is a retired Philippine Air Force general serving as the National Security Adviser since April 2026 in the administration of President Bongbong Marcos. He previously served as Chief of Staff of the Armed Forces of the Philippines from March to December 2011.

== Early life and education ==
He was born on December 13, 1955, in Castilla, Sorsogon, Philippines. He began his elementary days in Parañaque and finished his college at the University of Santo Tomas before he joined the Philippine Military Academy in 1975, where he belonged to the "Matapat" class of 1979. He earned his Master's degree in Business Economics at the University of Asia and the Pacific in Mandaluyong in 2005 when he was then the 5th Fighter Wing's Director for Operations. He also completed courses such as the language training course, pilot training, Squadron Officers Course and the Air Command and Staff Course.

== Military career ==
After graduating at the PMA in 1979, he held various courses in the Philippine Air Force and the AFP. He also served as a special assistant to the Minister of Trade and Industry from 1984 to 1986, and thereafter as the military assistant to the deputy defense minister before becoming the group commander of the Defense Intelligence and Security Group from November 1986 up to January 1988. He also served as a group commander at the Intelligence and Security Group of the Department of National Defense.

He also held command at two squadrons and as the Director for Operations at the 5th Fighter Wing, and also served as group commander of the Tactical Operations Group 12, as the Executive Officer OJ9, located at the Office of the Deputy Chief of Staff for Capability Materiel and Technology Development, and as an AFP Public Information officer. He also served as commander of the Air Defense Wing and the 1st Air Division.

Oban played a major role in the negotiation with Magdalo rebels involved in the Oakwood mutiny in 2003. He also served as the Deputy Chief of Staff for Plans, J5, and is viewed by many as the perfect back-stop for Former Philippine Air Force (PAF) Chief Lt. General Oscar Rabena, a member of PMA Class 1978 who was also the top AFP planner before he was named to lead the 17,000-strong major service command. He also served as the Vice Commander of the PAF, and prior to the appointment as the Chief of Staff, Oban served as the Deputy Chief of Staff of the AFP, responsible for the administration and supervision of the joint coordinating, technical and special staffs of the military headquarters at Camp Aguinaldo. He took helm as AFP Chief on 8 March 2011 and is the third chief of staff to come from the air force since 1996. He succeeded General Ricardo David and ended when he was succeeded by General Jessie Dellosa. On February 22, 2014, Oban was appointed by President Aquino to head the Visiting Forces Agreement Commission.

== National Security Adviser ==
On April 15, 2026, Oban was named as the new National Security Adviser following the resignation of Eduardo Año due to health concerns. He was appointed to the post due to his “extensive experience in military operations, defense planning, and national security”. Año also stated that Oban is capable sustaining ongoing national security initiatives under the Marcos administration.

== Awards in military service ==

1st row		Chief Commander, Philippine Legion of Honor	
2nd row	Officer, Philippine Legion of Honor	3 Distinguished Service Stars with one silver and one bronze anahaw clusters	Legionnaire, Philippine Legion of Honor
3rd row	Gawad sa Kaunlaran	Distinguished Aviation Cross	Military Merit Medals with three bronze spearhead devices
4th row	Military Merit Medals with four bronze anahaws	Military Merit Medals with four silver anahaws	Silver Wing Medal
5th row	Military Commendation Medals with one triangle clasp	Military Civic Action Medals with three campaign stars	Parangal sa Kapanalig ng Sandatahang Lakas ng Pilipinas
6th row	Long Service Medals with three campaign stars	Anti-Dissidence Campaign Medals with three campaign stars	Luzon Anti-Dissidence Campaign Medal with one campaign star
7th row	Visayas Anti-Dissidence Campaign Medal	Mindanao Anti-Dissidence Campaign Medal with two campaign stars	Disaster Relief and Rehabilitation Operations Ribbon

Right Side:

1st row		Philippine Republic Presidential Unit Citation	
2nd row	Martial Law Unit Citation	People Power I Unit Citation	People Power II Unit Citation

Badges and Other Awards:

- Combat Commander's Badge (Philippines)
- AFP Parachutist Badge
- Philippine Air Force Command and General Staff College Badge
- Golden Aviator Award
- AFP Logistics Eligibility Badge
- PAF Group Commander of the Year Award

== Personal life ==
He is married, and he has one son. Oban also served as one of the former generals endorsing former Vice President Leni Robredo in the 2022 presidential elections

Military offices
Preceded by Ricardo David	Chief of staff of the Philippine Armed Forces; March 8, 2011 – December 12, 2011	Succeeded by Jessie Dellosa
