= Jessie Dellosa =

Filipino general officer

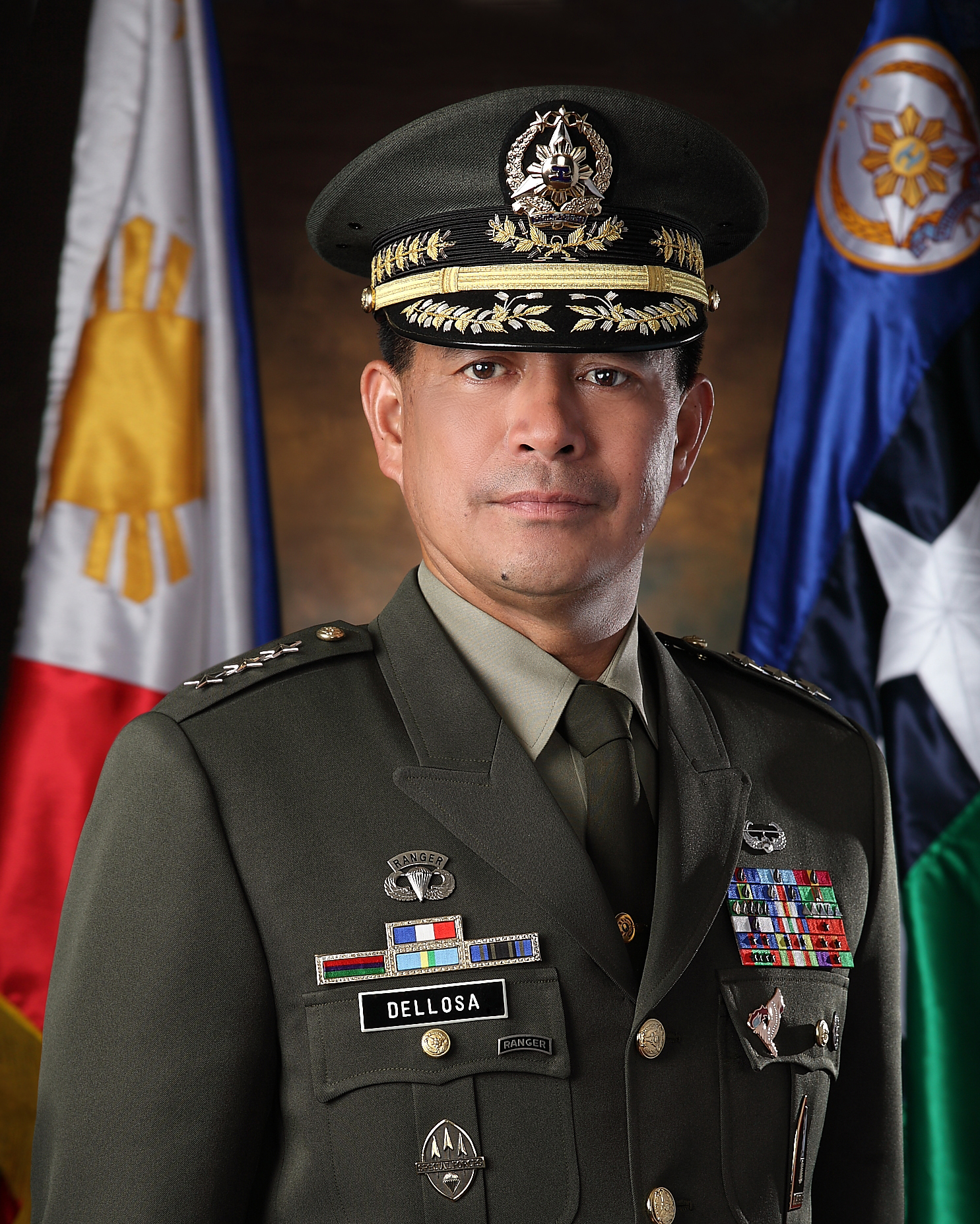
- Born: January 20, 1957 (age 69); Sorsogon City, Philippines
- Education: Philippine Military Academy
- Military career
- Allegiance: Republic of the Philippines
- Branch: Philippine Army
- Service years: 1979–2013
- Rank: General
- Commands: Chief of Staff, AFP; AFP Northern Luzon Command; 2nd Infantry Division; Special Operations Task Group Sulu; SRU Presidential Security Group

Jessie Diaz Dellosa (born January 20, 1957) is a retired Filipino general officer and a former Chief of staff of the Philippine Armed Forces. His former commands include the Northern Luzon Command and 2nd Infantry Division. He was deputy commander of Central Command in the Visayas and Commandant of the Philippine Military Academy. On 12 December 2011, President Benigno Aquino III chose Dellosa as his AFP chief.

== Background ==
Dellosa was born in Bacon, Sorsogon and grew up in Lucena City where he finished his elementary and secondary education. As a military officer, his other positions prior to his post as Northern Luzon Command (NolCom) commander include: Commanding General of the 2nd Infantry Division, Deputy Commander of Central Command in Visayas, Commandant of Cadets at the Philippine Military Academy.

Dellosa is a member of Philippine Military Academy “Matapat” Class of 1979. He was the commander of the NolCom prior to his appointment as chief of staff.

He was also the Group Commander of the Special Operation Task Group “Sulu” instrumental in the neutralization of Abu Sayyaf leader Abu Solaiman and the release of the Burnham couple in 2007.

He was also the commanding officer of the Special Reaction Unit of the Presidential Security Group during the time of President Corazon Aquino.

== AFP Chief of staff ==
On December 12, 2011, Philippine President Benigno Aquino III appointed Dellosa as chief of the Philippine Armed Forces. The president, in introducing his new Military Chief, said, "He is a true warrior... General Dellosa, do not turn your back on the mandate of the people”

== War against corruption ==
Armed Forces Chief Jessie D. Dellosa has declared an “all-out war against graft and corruption” during the change of command ceremony at Camp Aguinaldo on December 12, 2011. He said that, “An all-out war against graft and corruption and against few organizational misfits will free us from the seemingly never-ending corruption issue in the military”.

== Awards ==
- Philippine Republic Presidential Unit Citation
- Distinguished Service Star
- Gold Cross (Philippines)
- Outstanding Achievement Medal
- Gawad sa Kaunlaran
- Bronze Cross Medal
- Military Merit Medal (Philippines)
- Silver Wing Medal
- Military Commendation Medal
- Wounded Personnel Medal
- Military Civic Action Medal
- Long Service Medal
- Anti-Dissidence Campaign Medal
- Luzon Anti Dissidence Campaign Medal
- Visayas Anti-Dissidence Campaign Medal
- Mindanao Anti-dissidence Campaign Medal
- Disaster Relief & Rehabilitation Operation Ribbon
- Scout Ranger Qualification Badge
- Special Forces Qualification Badge
- Ranger tab

Military offices
Preceded by Eduardo Oban Jr.	Chief of staff of the Philippine Armed Forces; 2011 - 2013	Succeeded by Emmanuel T. Bautista
