= Rodrigo F. Maclang =

Lieutenant General Rodrigo F. Maclang
- Born: Surigao City, Surigao del Norte, Philippines
- Allegiance: Philippines
- Branch: Philippine Army
- Service years: 1976-2010
- Rank: Lieutenant General
- Commands: Deputy Chief of Staff, AFP; AFP Northern Luzon Command; 5th Infantry (STAR) Division, PA; 8th Infantry (Stormtroopers) Division, PA; Light Armor Brigade, PA; Joints Operations Center, AFP

Lieutenant General Rodrigo F. Maclang, was the 36th Vice Chief of Staff of the Armed Forces of the Philippines, the second highest position in the AFP hierarchy. Rodrigo Maclang also served as the commander of the Northern Luzon Command, 5th Infantry (STAR) Division, and 8th Infantry (Stormtroopers) Division.

== Background ==
Rodrigo Maclang was born in Surigao City, Surigao del Norte. He is happily married to Maria Lourdes Neri Maclang of Cagayan de Oro.

== Education ==
Rodrigo entered the military service after graduating from the Philippine Military Academy in 1976 with fellow "Magilas" batchmates, AFP Chief of Staff, Alexander B. Yano and Philippine Army Chief, Victor S. Ibrado. He took up various military courses such as Scout Ranger Course, Armor Officer Basic and Advance Courses, Staff Officer Course, Basic Airborne Course, and the Military Intelligence Officer Basic Course. He also took specialized courses in the United States, namely: the Supply Management Officer Course at the US QM School in Fort Lee, Virginia; the Command and General Staff Course at US Army CGSC in Fort Leavenworth, Kansas; and, the Defense Resource Management Course at the Naval Postgraduate School in Monterey, California.

== Military career ==
In his more than thirty years in the military service, Lt. Gen. Maclang served in various positions in the AFP. As a company grade officer, he served as Platoon Leader of the 19th Infantry Battalion; Executive Officer of Echo Company of 2nd Light Armor Battalion, PALAR; and, Commanding Officer of three (3) Intelligence Security Units of ISG, PA. As a field grade Officer, he commanded the 58th Infantry Battalion, 4ID, PA engaged in counterinsurgency operations in Southern Philippines. As a staff Officer, he served as Operations Officer of the Counter Intelligence Unit, PA; Assistant Chief of Staff for Intelligence, G2 of 4ID, PA; Chief of Policy and Research Division of ODCS for Operations, J3, AFP; Assistant Chief of Staff for Operations, AC3, AFP Southern Command; and, Deputy Chief of Staff for Intelligence, J2, GHQ, AFP.

He is also a recipient of several awards foremost of which are the Presidential Legion of Honor (Decree of Officer), Outstanding Achievement Medal, seven (7) Distinguished Service Stars, eight (8) Bronze Cross Medals, twenty five (25) Military Merit Medals and several other types of awards and decorations.

Military offices
Preceded by Lt. Gen. Bonifacio Ramos	AFP Northern Luzon Command – Commander; 16 August 2007 – 6 May 2008	Succeeded by Maj. Gen. Isagani Cachuela
Preceded by Lt. Gen. Pedro Insierto	Armed Forces of The Philippines – Deputy Chief of Staff; 6 May 2008 – 1 May 2009	Succeeded by Vice Adm. Emilio Marayag
Preceded by Lt. Gen. Cardozo Luna	Armed Forces of The Philippines – Vice Chief of Staff; 1 May 2009 – 9 June 2010	Succeeded by Lt. Gen. Nestor Ochoa
