= Anthony Alcantara =

Philippine Army lieutenant general

Anthony J. Alcantara

Executive Director of the Philippine Center on Transnational Crime
- Incumbent
- Assumed office August 2024

Special Envoy on Transnational Crime
- Incumbent
- Assumed office May 2023

Military service
- Allegiance: Philippines
- Branch/service: Philippine Army
- Years of service: 1979–2013
- Rank: Lieutenant General
- Commands: Deputy Chief of Staff, AFP; AFP Northern Luzon Command; 6th Infantry Division, Cotabato City

Anthony "Cantoi" J. Alcantara is a retired Philippine Army lieutenant general and former police officer who has served as the executive director of the Philippine Center on Transnational Crime (PCTC) since 2024. He had previously served as the deputy chief of staff of the Armed Forces of the Philippines from May 3, 2011 to February 2012, as well as commander of the 6th Infantry Division in Cotabato City from November 27, 2009 to May 2, 2011. He was previously a member of the Philippine Constabulary's Special Action Force under Fidel V. Ramos during the People Power Revolution in 1986, and later served as the spokesperson of the Philippine Army in the early 2000s.

As 6th Infantry commander, he implemented the nine-day martial law order of president Gloria Macapagal Arroyo in the wake of the Maguindanao massacre in 2009. In March 2025, he arrested former president Rodrigo Duterte based on an arrest warrant issued by the International Criminal Court (ICC).

== Education ==
Alcantara graduated from the Philippine Military Academy in 1979.

== Police and military career ==
brary"/>

In the early 2000s, Alcantara served as the spokesperson of the Philippine Army. On November 27, 2009, Alcantara assumed command of the 6th Infantry Division in Cotabato City four days after the Maguindanao massacre occurred, enforcing the government's nine-day implementation of martial law in order to arrest the incident's perpetrators and prevent further violence from occurring.

In May 2011, Alcantara was named deputy chief of staff of the Armed Forces of the Philippines, succeeding Emmanuel Bautista and holding the position until early February 2012, when he assumed command of the AFP Northern Luzon Command.

== Civilian career ==
On April 28, 2023, Alcantara's appointment as Special Envoy on Transnational Crime (SETC) was announced by the Marcos administration, with him assuming office in May 2023. By August 2024, Alcantara was appointed executive director of the Philippine Center on Transnational Crime (PCTC).

On the morning of March 11, 2025, Alcantara, in coordination with Interpol, served with prosecutor general Richard Fadullon of the Department of Justice the warrant of arrest issued by the International Criminal Court (ICC) to former president Rodrigo Duterte upon the latter's return from Hong Kong.
