= Camp Servillano Aquino =

Philippine military base in Tarlac City

Camp General Servillano S. Aquino
- Tarlac City in the Philippines
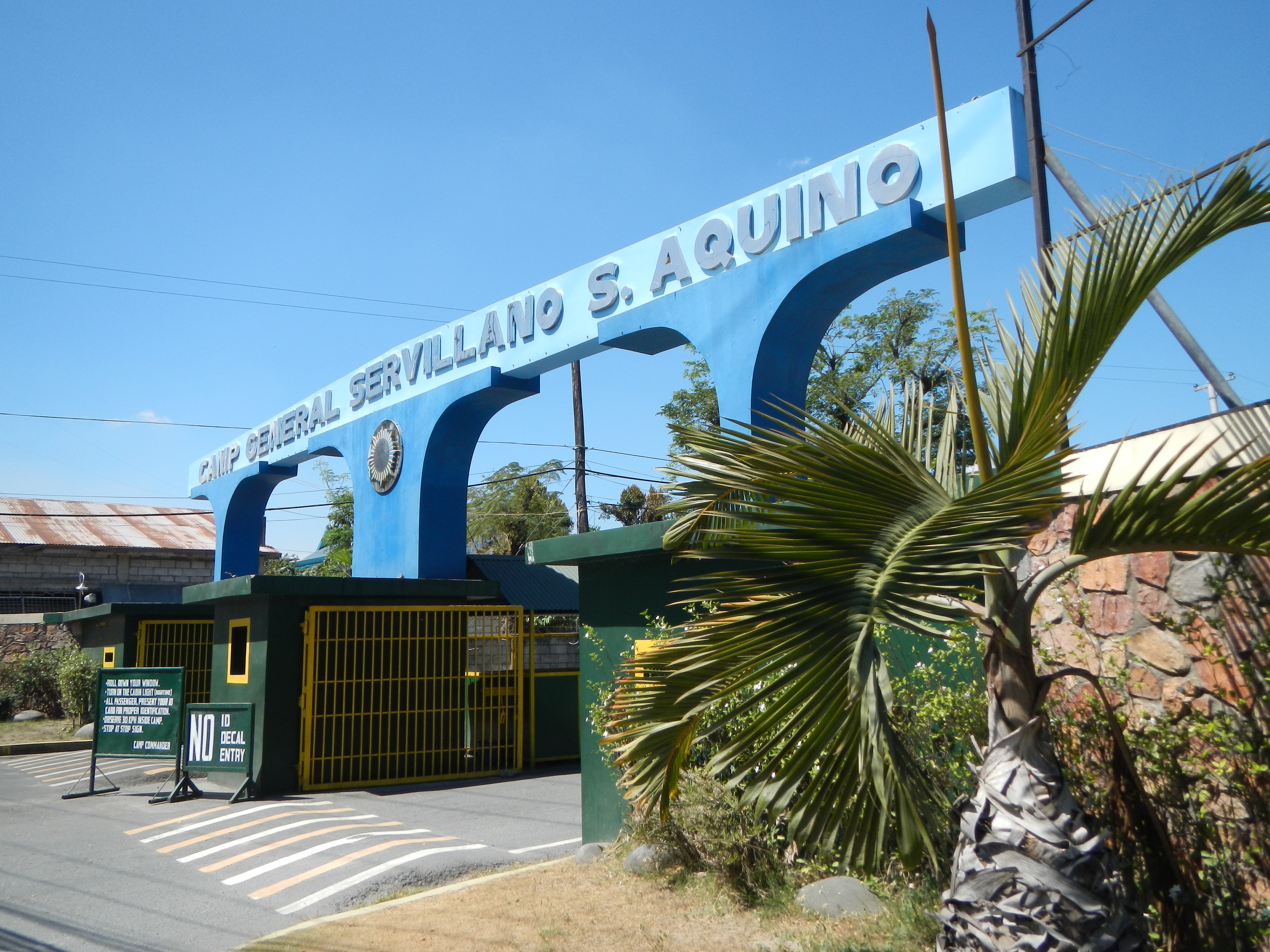

Site information
- Type: Army base
- Controlled by: Philippines

Location
- Coordinates: 15°26′08.8″N 120°35′33.4″E

Garrison information
- Current commander: LTGEN Aristotle D Gonzalez (PAF)
- Garrison: AFP Northern Luzon Command

Camp General Servillano S. Aquino is a military base in Tarlac City, Philippines.

== History ==
Under Proclamation No. 255 issued on June 3, 1964 by the administration of President Diosdado Macapagal, certain parcels of land in the then municipality of Tarlac (now Tarlac City) was allocated to the Armed Forces of the Philippines (AFP) for military reservation purposes. Camp Servillano Aquino would later built on the site and would serve as the headquarters of the AFP's Northern Luzon Command.

In the 2020s, the Army Support Command of Northern and Central Luzon started to move its headquarters to Camp Aquino from Fort Bonifacio in Taguig. In 2022, the Bases Conversion and Development Authority (BCDA) turned over the first set of newly-constructed facilities to the Army Support Command (ASCOM).

== Camp Aquino Museum ==
Reopened in 2025, the Ninoy & Cory Aquino Foundation (NCAF) re-opened the Aquino Center and Museum after two years of renovations, in time for the 39th anniversary of the People Power Revolution. The museum is dedicated to honoring the lives of assassinated Senator Ninoy Aquino, former President Corazon Aquino, and their son, former President Benigno Aquino III. The newly refurbished museum now features an updated section on the 1987 Constitution, a display on Cory Aquino’s post-presidency, and a wing dedicated to the younger Aquino president.

On Display:

- Lockheed T-33 - Philippine Air Force T-33A (29585 / 585)
- Aero Commander 500 family - Philippine Army Aerocommander 681 (RP-C775)
- Bell UH-1 Iroquois - Philippine Air Force UH-1H (＊6022)
- M41 Walker Bulldog -Philippine Army
- Cadillac Gage Commando - Philippine Army
