= 5th Infantry Division (Philippines) =

Fifth Infantry Division
- Coat of arms of the 5ID
- Active: May 11, 1981-present
- Country: Philippines
- Branch: Philippine Army
- Type: Infantry
- Role: Conventional Warfare, Anti-Guerrilla Operations
- Size: 3 Brigades
- Part of: Under the Philippine Army (Since 1981)
- Garrison/HQ: Camp Melchor F. dela Cruz, Upi, Gamu, Isabela
- Nickname: Star Division
- Motto: Only our best is good enough
- Mascot: Star
- Anniversaries: May 11
- Engagements: Communist Insurgency in the Philippines; Anti-guerrilla operations against the NPA

Commanders
- Current commander: MGen. Audrey L. Pasia, PA
- Notable commanders: BGen Felix Brawner AFP, MGen Rodrigo Maclang AFP, BGen Edgardo Batenga AFP, MGen Angelo Reyes AFP, MGen Jaime S Delos Santos AFP, BGen Antonio Palafox AFP, MGen Rodolfo Garcia AFP,

Insignia
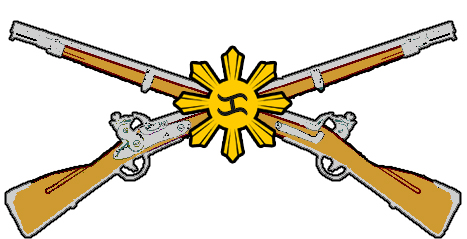
- Armed Forces Occupational Specialty Insignia

The 5th Infantry Division, Philippine Army, known officially as the Star Division, is the Philippine Army's primary infantry unit in Northern Luzon, and specializes in anti-guerrilla warfare.

== History ==
The division traces its history to the organization of the 5th Army Brigade on October 16, 1972, as a major unit of the Philippine Army pursuant to General Orders Number 153, General Headquarters, Armed Forces of the Philippines with its station located in Camp Servillano S. Aquino in San Miguel, Tarlac. Brig. Gen. Miguel M. Villamor was appointed as the Commanding General and the unit's territorial jurisdiction covered Zambales, Bataan, Bulacan, Pampanga, and portion of Quezon - north of Umiray River. On March 29, 1976, Col. Benjamin G. Santos took charge of the Brigade.

On May 11, 1981, the 5th Army Brigade (Separate) was elevated and became known as the 5th Infantry Division pursuant to General Orders Number 365, GHQ, AFP to address the growing threat of the local communist movement.

The 5th Infantry Division figured in a minor role during the 1986 People Power revolution because forces loyal to the Marcos dictatorship ordered the unit to travel from its homebase in Tarlac to reinforce the forces which were supposed to assault Camp Aguinaldo and Camp Crame in the aftermath of the failed February 22 1986 Enrile and Reform the Armed Forces Movement coup plot. The unit was never able to leave Tarlac because 20,000 people blocked the Bamban Bridge which connects Bamban, Tarlac to Mabalacat, Pampanga on Feb. 25 to prevent it from proceeding to Manila, where a civilian-led movement which demanded the ouster of Ferdinand Marcos had decided to prevent the coup plotters from being overtaken. Marcos was resultingly forced into exile in the early hours of February 26.

The 5th Infantry Division became distinguished as it spearheaded several campaigns against the local communist movement starting from the renowned Marag Valley in Cagayan, which was their sanctuary where the Headquarters of the Far North Luzon Regional Party Committee of the Northern Luzon Commission was discovered. It was also the training base of the communist forces coming from other NPA units. Marag Valley is a vast forest land extending from the foot of Mt. Siamsanderie in Luna, Apayao to the Malababie Valley in Pamplona, Cagayan. Most of the land area is thickly forested which gives an impression of “virginity” and settlements are found along the mighty Marag River. From 1990 to 1993, massive operations were launched to restore peace and order situation in the area and continued operations were pursued in the areas of Paco-Zinundungan complex in the same province to Mabiga-Poguin complex in Isabela.

The campaign called for the proper orchestration and synchronization of efforts of the Army with various sector organizations and the local government.

In effect, the masses started to withdraw their support from the local communist movement while several members gave up and/or surrendered to the government renouncing the bloody communist struggle. Support in urban areas fell and by 1991, they merely had some 18,000 available. The Army with the full support of various sector organizations and the local government units pressed on with the momentum to put an end to the insurgency.

The communists became suspicious of its members and began a massive internal purge of the movement that killed thousands of partisans and members on accusations of being deep penetration agents and informers of the AFP. They also started to target US servicemen with their assassination teams called "Sparrow Units" but these activities only lost them yet more support.

These acts serve today as the foundation of a more controlled security environment and a socio-economic up-trend in favor of the populace in Northern Luzon.

On November 7, 1994, the home of the 5th Infantry Division was transferred to Camp Upi in Gamu, Isabela and is now called Camp Melchor F. dela Cruz. The Headquarters directs and employs three infantry brigades with its operationally controlled infantry battalions strategically positioned in the provinces of Ilocos Norte, Ilocos Sur, Kalinga, Apayao, Cagayan, Isabela, Ifugao, Quirino and Nueva Vizcaya.

In an effort to contribute greatly in the prevailing peace and order situation in the country, the Division sent combat units to Mindanao, particularly in Basilan and Jolo-Sulu area to bring an end to the terrorist Abu Sayyaf Group. After the 77th Infantry Battalion made a remarkable stint in the area from 1999 to 2001, it was replaced with the full-complement of the 53rd Division Reconnaissance Company last November 2006 to June 2007 and has significantly contributed in the hunt to destroy the notorious terrorist Abu Sayyaf Group.

The stable security environment in the areas of Northern Luzon has been laboriously achieved through the years by the officers and men of the 5th Infantry Division, now under the leadership of MGen Pablo M Lorenzo. AFP.

== Mission ==
The mission of the 5th Infantry Division is to conduct internal security operations in the Ilocos, Cagayan Valley, and Cordillera Administrative Regions to destroy the communist terrorists and other threat groups in order to establish a physically and psychologically secured environment conducive to economic development.

== Current units ==
=== Brigades ===
- 501st Infantry (Valiant) Brigade
- 502nd Infantry (Liberator) Brigade
- 503rd Infantry (Justice and Peace) Brigade

=== Battalions ===
- 77th Infantry (Don't Dare The Double Seven) Battalion
- 17th Infantry (Do or Die) Battalion
- 21st Infantry (Invincible) Battalion
- 45th Infantry (Gallant) Battalion
- 54th Infantry (Magilas) Battalion
- 41st Infantry (Partner for Peace) Battalion
- 50th Infantry (Defender) Battalion
- 86th Infantry (Highlander) Battalion
- 95th Infantry (Salaknib) Battalion
- 98th Infantry (Masinag) Battalion
- 103rd Infantry (Mabalasik) Battalion
- 102nd Infantry (Kaakibat) Battalion
- 51st Division Reconnaissance Company
- 52nd Division Reconnaissance Company
- 53rd Division Reconnaissance Company

== Operations ==
- Anti-guerrilla operations against the New People's Army
