= Vice-Chief of Staff of the Armed Forces of the Philippines =

Military officer ranking in the Philippines

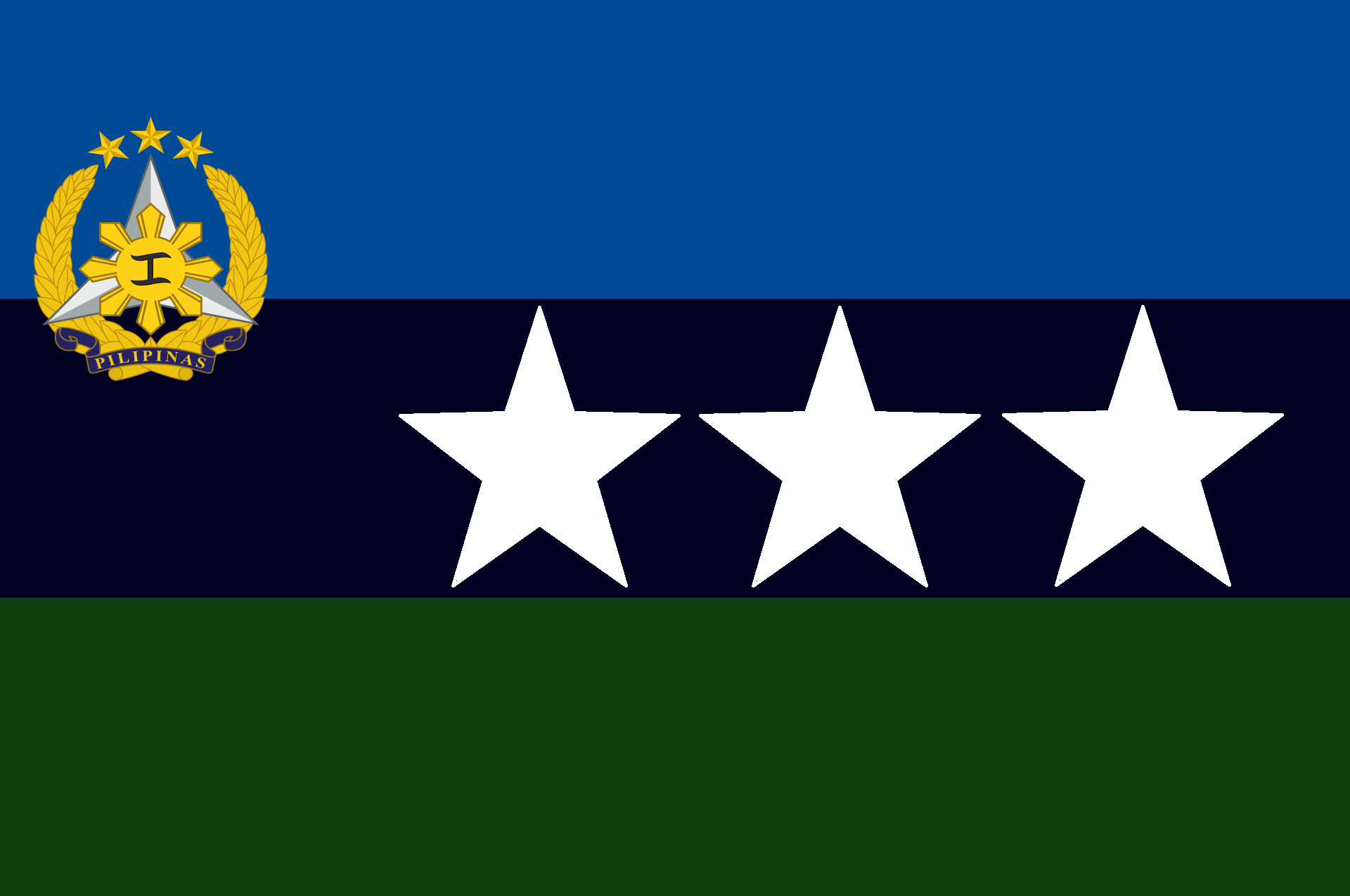
- Flag of the Vice-Chief of Staff of the Armed Forces of the Philippines

- Incumbent; Lieutenant General Rommel P. Roldan, PAF since March 11, 2026
- Department of National Defense
- Type: Military Leadership
- Status: Active
- Abbreviation: VCSAFP
- Member of: AFP Board of Generals
- Reports to: Secretary of National Defense (SND); Chief of Staff of the Armed Forces of the Philippines (CSAFP)
- Residence: Camp General Emilio Aguinaldo, Quezon City, Philippines
- Seat: Camp General Emilio Aguinaldo, Quezon City, Philippines
- Nominator: AFP Board of Generals
- Appointer: President of the Republic of the Philippines with Commission of Appointment approval
- Term length: Mandatory Retirement Age at 57
- Precursor: Vice-Chief of Staff of the Philippine Commonwealth Army
- Formation: September 28, 1899
- First holder: Major General Ambrosio Flores
- Succession: The Deputy Chief of Staff of the Armed Forces of the Philippines; Chief of Army
- Unofficial names: Vice-Chairman of the Joint Chiefs
- Deputy: The Deputy Chief of Staff of the Armed Forces of the Philippines
- Vice-Chief of Staff sometimes appointed to lower post with the same rank.

The Vice-Chief of Staff (VCS) is the second highest military officer in the Armed Forces of the Philippines. As principal assistant of the Chief of Staff of the Armed Forces of the Philippines, they assist in administrative matters and in their operational duties, as well as in policy conceptualization and implementation matters in the AFP, while Chief of Staff focus on military operations and the country's security. The Vice-Chief of Staff also assists the AFP Chief of Staff in their absence and presides the meeting on the AFP Chief of Staff's behalf. The Vice-Chief of Staff holds a rank of 3-star officer as Lieutenant General or Vice Admiral (O-9) and is appointed by the President of the Philippines who is the Commander in Chief of the Armed Forces.

== Background ==
The position of Vice-Chief of Staff can be traced prior the Philippine–American War in 1899 were in General Ambrosio Flores was selected as Assistant Chief of Operations under General Antonio Luna. He took command in acting capacity upon his death in June 1899 until General Aguinaldo took over the command of revolutionary army personally until the end of the war on March 23, 1901, upon the capture of Aguinaldo in Palanan, Isabela.

Under the Commonwealth Act No. 1 or also known as National Defense Act of 1935 the position again was created to assist the Chief of Staff of the Philippine Commonwealth Army. Which led to the creation of three major services in the following years Army, Navy, Air Force, and the Marine Corps. While there were officers from the Philippine Constabulary that became Vice-Chief of Staff, the service has been dissolved and transition to civilian law enforcement service Philippine National Police (PNP). In 1982 Major General Fidel V. Ramos was appointed as Vice-Chief of Staff and concurrent Chief of the Philippine Constabulary and Director General of the Integrated National Police. He was later appointed Chief of Staff after EDSA revolution.

On June 19, 2020, under the DND Order no. 174, the title of Vice-Chief of Staff was renamed as the vice-chairman of the Joint Chiefs, while the Chief of Staff as Chairman of the Joint Chiefs, and The Deputy Chief of Staff as Chief of the Joint Staff. Although the usage of these titles were deferred.

== Organization and term limit ==
Under the AFP Hierarchy, the Vice-Chief of Staff holds a rank of 3-star general officer rank, either Lieutenant General or Vice Admiral. The Vice-Chief of Staff of the AFP is nominated by the President of the Philippines upon the recommendation of the AFP Board of Generals and will also be required to be subject to hearings under the Commission on Appointments for them to be formally approved in their positions. The Vice-Chief of Staff has no fixed term and is subject to mandatory retirement upon reaching the age of 57 under the Republic Act No. 11939 and is also eligible to be appointed as the AFP Chief of Staff, unless appointed by the president.

== Officeholders ==
This is the list of officers who were appointed as Vice-Chief of Staff or Acting Capacity. In all 9 came from Philippine Constabulary before it was deactivated, 29 from the Philippine Army, 2 from Philippine Marine Corps, 6 from the Philippine Air Force, and 6 from the Philippine Navy.

No.	Portrait	Vice-Chief of Staff	Took office	Left office	Time in office	Service Branch	Ref.
1	Ambrosio Flores	Brigadier General; Ambrosio Flores (March 20, 1843–June 12, 1912); Assistant Chief of War Operations	June 6, 1898	January 4, 1900	1 year, 4 days	Philippine Revolutionary Army	
2	Basilio Valdes	Brigadier General; Basilio Valdes	January 11, 1935	December 28, 1938	3 years, 351 days	Philippine Constabulary	
3	Vicente Lim	Brigadier General; Vicente Lim (1892–1945) (Note: Lim was the Vice-Chief of Staff while commanding 41st Infantry Division during WW2.)	January 11, 1938	May 4, 1942	3 years, 83 days	Philippine Army	
4	Mariano Castañeda	Brigadier General; Mariano Castañeda (December 20, 1892–September 8, 1970); Served as concurrent Provost Marshal and Chief of Constabulary	January 11, 1946	December 21, 1948	2 years, 345 days	Philippine Constabulary	
5	Calixto Duque	Brigadier General; Calixto Duque	January 11, 1949	May 4, 1951	2 years, 113 days	Philippine Army	
6	Jesus Vargas	Brigadier General; Jesus Vargas	January 11, 1951	May 4, 1953	2 years, 113 days	Philippine Army	
7	Eulogio Balao	Brigadier General; Eulogio Balao (Note: Balao was appointed as Secretary of National Defense upon retirement in 1956)	January 1, 1954	December 31, 1956	2 years, 365 days	Philippine Constabulary	
8	Alfonso Arellano	Major General; Alfonso Arellano	January 1, 1957	December 31, 1957	364 days	Philippine Constabulary	
9	Manuel Cabal	Major General; Manuel Cabal	January 1, 1958	December 31, 1959	1 year, 354 days	Philippine Constabulary	
10	Pelagio Cruz	Major General; Pelagio Cruz	January 1, 1959	May 4, 1961	2 years, 123 days	Philippine Air Force	
11	Alfredo Santos	Major General; Alfredo Santos	May 4, 1961	May 4, 1962	1 year, 0 days	Philippine Army	
12	Antonio De Veyra	Major General; Antonio De Veyra	May 4, 1962	July 12, 1964	2 years, 69 days	Philippine Army	
14	Pedro Molina	Major General; Pedro Molina	July 12, 1964	May 4, 1965	296 days	Philippine Air Force	
12	Ismael Lapus	Major General; Ismael Lapus	May 4, 1965	July 12, 1966	1 year, 69 days	Philippine Army	
14	Victor Osias	Major General; Victor Osias	July 12, 1966	August 16, 1967	1 year, 35 days	Philippine Air Force	
15	Segundo Velasco	Lieutenant General; Segundo Velasco	August 16, 1967	January 11, 1968	148 days	Philippine Constabulary	
16	Gaudencio Tobias	Major General; Gaudencio Tobias	January 11, 1968	May 4, 1969	1 year, 113 days	Philippine Army	
16	Romeo Espino	Major General; Romeo Espino	May 4, 1969	May 4, 1972	3 years, 0 days	Philippine Army	
17	Rafael Ileto	Lieutenant General; Rafael Ileto (Note: Ileto was Ambassador to Iran and Turkey the entire term as Vice-Chief of staff. He continued upon retirement) (Note: Ileto founder of Scout Ranger Regiment, he was appointed as Vice-Chief of Staff in 1975 but was serving as ambassador to Iran and Turkmenistan until 1978. He took this position in 1978 - 1981 but was appointed again as Ambassador to Thailand and Cambodia months before his term expired. He was Secretary of National Defense in 1986 to 1988.)	January 11, 1975	May 4, 1981	6 years, 113 days	Philippine Army	
19	Fidel V. Ramos	Lieutenant General; Fidel V. Ramos concurrent Chief of Constabulary and Director of Integrated National Police. He was Acting AFP Chief of Staff (1984-1985)	January 11, 1982	February 26, 1986	4 years, 56 days	Philippine Constabulary	
20	Salvador M. Mison	Lieutenant General; Salvador M. Mison	January 11, 1986	May 4, 1988	2 years, 114 days	Philippine Army	
21	Renato de Villa	Lieutenant General; Renato de Villa (Note: Appointed Chief of Staff and later Secretary of National Defense under President Fidel V. Ramos.)	January 11, 1986	March 4, 1988	2 years, 113 days	Philippine Constabulary	
22	Eduardo Ermita	Major General; Eduardo Ermita	March 4, 1988	May 4, 1990	114 days	Philippine Army	
23	Rodolfo Biazon	Lieutenant General; Rodolfo Biazon (Note: Biazon was appointed Chief of Staff for 3 months. He was elected Senator and Congressmen upon retirement.)	January 11, 1990	May 4, 1991	1 year, 113 days	Philippine Marine Corps	
24	Guillermo Flores	Major General; Guillermo Flores	March 4, 1990	May 4, 1992	2 years, 114 days	Philippine Army	
25	Alberto Filler	Lieutenant General; Alberto Filler (Note: Appointed as Director General of National Intelligence Coordinating Agency (NICA) upon retirement.)	January 11, 1993	May 4, 1994	3 years, 113 days	Philippine Army	
26	Clemente Mariano	Lieutenant General; Clemente Mariano	January 11, 1996	May 4, 1997	1 year, 113 days	Philippine Army	
27	Ismael Villareal	Lieutenant General; Ismael Villareal	January 11, 1997	July 16, 1998	1 year, 186 days	Philippine Army	
28	Luisito Fernandez	Vice Admiral; Luisito Fernandez	February 04, 1998	January 15, 1999	227 days	Philippine Navy	
-	Eduardo Maria Santos	Vice Admiral; Eduardo Maria Santos (Acting Capacity & concurrent Navy Flag Officer in Command)	January 1, 1999	April 16, 1999	105 days	Philippine Navy	
29	Victor Mayo	Lieutenant General; Victor Mayo	August 11, 1999	April 12, 2000	252 days	Philippine Army	
30	Jose Calimlim	Lieutenant General; Jose Calimlim	April 12, 2000	June 4, 2001	1 year, 22 days	Philippine Army	
31	Gregorio Camiling	Lieutenant General; Gregorio Camiling (Note: Appointed as Commanding General Philippine Army after his term as Vice-Chief of Staff)	October 1, 2001	November 15, 2002	1 year, 45 days	Philippine Army	
32	Rodolfo Garcia	Lieutenant General; Rodolfo Garcia	January 11, 2004	May 4, 2005	2 years, 113 days	Philippine Army	
33	Ariston Delos Reyes	Vice Admiral; Ariston Delos Reyes (born February 16, 1950)	July 04, 2004	February 16, 2006	1 year, 227 days	Philippine Navy	
34	Antonio Romero	Lieutenant General; Antonio Romero	April 30, 2006	May 07, 2008	2 years, 7 days	Philippine Army	
35	Cardozo Luna	Lieutenant General; Cardozo Luna (Note: Cardozo Luna is a descendant of General Antonio Luna, who served and died during second phase of revolutionary war.)	January 11, 2008	May 4, 2009	1 year, 113 days	Philippine Army	
36	Rodrigo Maclang	Lieutenant General; Rodrigo Maclang	April 30, 2009	June 9, 2010	1 year, 40 days	Philippine Army	
37	Nestor Z. Ochoa	Lieutenant General; Nestor Z. Ochoa; Acting Chief of Staff (April 2010 - July 2010)	June 9, 2010	May 4, 2011	1 year, 113 days	Philippine Army	
-	Mario Catacutan	Rear Admiral; Mario Catacutan; Acting Vice-Chief & concurrent Deputy Chief of Staff	June 30, 2010	July 2, 2010	1 year, 0 days	Philippine Navy	
38	Reynaldo Mapagu	Lieutenant General; Reynaldo Mapagu	June 17, 2011	October 12, 2012	1 year, 275 days	Philippine Army	
39	Noel Coballes	Lieutenant General; Noel Coballes (born 1958)	October 19, 2012	January 22, 2013	95 days	Philippine Army	
40	Alan Luga	Lieutenant General; Alan Luga	February 5, 2013	May 12, 2014	2 years, 113 days	Philippine Army	
41	Gregorio Catapang Jr.	Lieutenant General; Gregorio Catapang Jr.	February 14, 2014	July 18, 2014	2 years, 113 days	Philippine Army	
42	John S. Bonafos	Lieutenant General; John S. Bonafos	January 11, 2015	October 16, 2015	2 years, 113 days	Philippine Army	
43	Romeo Tanalgo	Lieutenant General; Romeo Tanalgo concurrent Commandant Philippine Marine Corps until 2016	October 16, 2015	March 10, 2016	202 days	Philippine Marine Corps	
44	Glorioso Miranda	Lieutenant General; Glorioso Miranda (born October 8, 1961); Acting AFP Chief of Staff April 12, 2016 - June 30, 2016 (Note: Served in acting capacity as Chief of Staff for 2 months and appointed Commanding General Philippine Army after his term as Vice-Chief of Staff.)	March 10, 2016	January 12, 2017	310 days	Philippine Army	
45	Salvador Melchor B. Mison Jr	Lieutenant General; Salvador Melchor B. Mison Jr (Note: son of LGen. Salvador Mison of Philippine Army who served as Vice-Chief of Staff in 1986, they are the only father and son who took the same office.)	January 11, 2019	May 4, 2020	1 year, 114 days	Philippine Air Force	
46	Gaudencio Collado	Vice Admiral; Gaudencio Collado	June 20, 2019	November 21, 2020	1 year, 154 days	Philippine Navy	
47	Erickson Gloria	Lieutenant General; Erickson Gloria	November 21, 2019	September 9, 2022	2 years, 292 days	Philippine Air Force	
-	Rommel Anthony SD Reyes	Vice Admiral; Rommel Anthony SD Reyes; Acting Capacity	September 9, 2022	November 22, 2022	74 days	Philippine Navy	
48	Arthur Cordura	Lieutenant General; Arthur Cordura	November 22, 2022	December 19, 2024	3 years, 290 days	Philippine Air Force	
49	Jimmy D. Larida	Lieutenant General; Jimmy D. Larida	January 23, 2025	March 11, 2026	1 year, 47 days	Philippine Marine Corps	
50	Rommel P. Roldan	Lieutenant General; Rommel P. Roldan	March 11, 2026	Incumbent	181 days	Philippine Air Force	-

== See also ==
- Chief of Staff of the Armed Forces of the Philippines
- Deputy Chief of Staff of the Armed Forces of the Philippines
- Armed Forces of the Philippines
- Philippine Army
- Philippine Air Force
- Philippine Navy
- Philippine Marine Corps
