= Ricardo Papa =

Military general and police officer

Chief of the Manila Police Department
- In office March 26, 1966 – March 13, 1968
- Preceded by: Eugenio Torres
- Succeeded by: Enrique Morales

Deputy Chief of Staff of the Armed Forces of the Philippines
- In office December 21, 1962 – December 31, 1963
- President: Diosdado Macapagal
- Preceded by: Pelagio Cruz
- Succeeded by: Nicanor Garcia

Commanding General of the Philippine Army
- In office January 1, 1963 – August 31, 1963
- President: Diosdado Macapagal
- Preceded by: Dominador García
- Succeeded by: Ernesto Mata

Military service
- Allegiance: Philippines
- Branch/service: Philippine Army
- Years of service: 1940s–1963
- Rank: Brigadier General
- Unit: 91st Infantry Division
- Commands: Deputy Chief of Staff of the Armed Forces of the Philippines; Commanding General of the Philippine Army
- Battles/wars: Fall of the Philippines; Battle of Bataan; Bataan Death March

Ricardo G. Papa was a Filipino general and police officer.

== Military career ==
Papa served in the Philippine Army since in the early 1940s until 1963. When he was assigned at the 91st Division as a G-3 officer and captain, he survived the Pantingan River massacre which occurred during the Bataan Death March.

He became the Commanding General of the Army for over 200 days in 1963.

== Police career ==
He became the Chief of Police of the Manila Police Department from 1966 to 1968.

== Personal life ==
His son and namesake, Ricardo Papa Jr. served as mayor of Taguig from 1992 to 1995 and from 1997 to 2001.

== Legacy ==
A street and a train station, including the former name of Camp Bagong Diwa, was named after him.
