= Deputy Chief of Staff of the Armed Forces of the Philippines =

Third highest-ranking position in the Armed Forces of the Philippines

The Deputy Chief of Staff of the Armed Forces of the Philippines
- Emblem of the Armed Forces of the Philippines

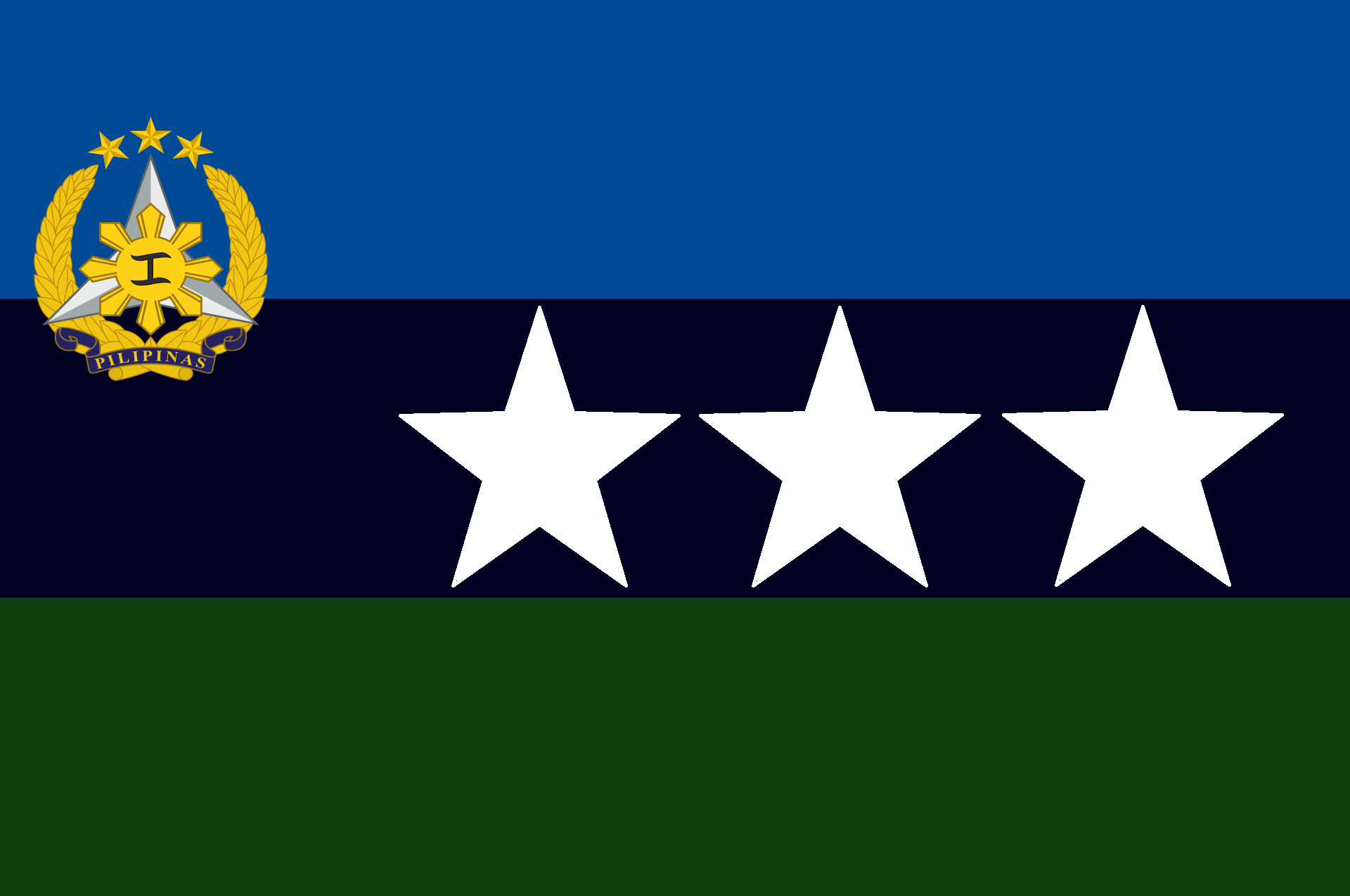
- Incumbent; Lieutenant General Edmundo G. Peralta PA since May 19, 2026
- Armed Forces of the Philippines; Department of National Defense
- Style: TDCS
- Type: Military Leadership
- Abbreviation: TDCSAFP
- Member of: AFP Board of Generals; AFP Joint Staff
- Reports to: Secretary of National Defense (SND); Chief of Staff of the Armed Forces of the Philippines (CSAFP)
- Residence: Camp General Emilio Aguinaldo, Quezon City, Philippines
- Seat: Camp General Emilio Aguinaldo, Quezon City, Philippines
- Nominator: AFP Board of Generals
- Appointer: President of the Philippines
- Term length: Mandatory Retirement Age at 57
- Formation: September 28, 1899

The Deputy Chief of Staff of the Armed Forces of the Philippines (TDCSAFP) is a three-star general or flag officer who holds the third-highest position in the Armed Forces of the Philippines (AFP). The Deputy Chief of Staff assists the chief of staff and the Vice Chief of Staff in the performance of their respective functions by providing intelligence, operational, and logistical support. The deputy chief of staff is appointed by the president of the Philippines with the confirmation by the Commission on Appointments.

The Deputy Chief of Staff also serves as the director of the Joint Staff, which consists of the Deputy Chief of Staff for Personnel (J1), the Deputy Chief of Staff for Intelligence (J2), the Deputy Chief of Staff for Operations (J3), the Deputy Chief of Staff for Logistics (J4), the Deputy Chief of Staff for Plans (J5), the Deputy Chief of Staff for Command, Control, Communications, Computers, Intelligence, Surveillance, Target Acquisition and Reconnaissance (J6), the Deputy Chief of Staff for Civil-Military Operations (J7), the Deputy Chief of Staff for Education, Training and Doctrine (J8), the Deputy Chief of Staff for Reserve Force Development (J9), and the Deputy Chief of Staff for Financial Management (J10).

== Background ==
Prior to Filipino-American War, European-trained General Antonio Luna was selected by President Emilio Aguinaldo as assistant secretary of war and commanding general of Republican Army. He organized his staff and selected Visayas-born Brigadier General Venancio Concepcion as chief of general staff to put coordination all the functions of the General Staffs and units. After the war was lost no Filipino Army exists until 1935 when Philippine Commonwealth Army was organized in preparation for its independence in 10 years period. Initial President Manuel Quezon selected Major Paulino Santos as Chief of Staff but he cannot remove him from his current position as director of Bureau of Prisons due to the impending transfer of Bilibid Prison out of City of Manila and the undergoing organization of Iwahig and Davao Penal Colonies. Delos Reyes was appointed as acting until Santos is available but Quezon appointed Santos as The Deputy Chief of Staff although he is not doing the function but he wanted him to report to the Headquarters of the Army.

After World War II Brigadier General Macario Peralta Jr., war hero and veteran, was appointed by President Manuel Roxas to be The Deputy Chief of Staff. He is the first on the post on the modern Armed Forces of the Philippines.

On June 19, 2020, under the DND Order no. 174, the title of Chief of Staff was renamed as the Chairman of the Joint Chiefs, while the Vice-Chief of Staff as Vice-Chairman of the Joint Chiefs, and The Deputy Chief of Staff as Chief of the Joint Staff. Although the usage of these titles was deferred.

== Organization and term limit ==
Under the organization of the AFP, The Deputy Chief of Staff holds a rank of 3-star general officer rank, either lieutenant general or vice admiral. The Deputy Chief of Staff is nominated by the President of the Philippines upon the recommendation of the AFP Board of Generals. The appointee will also be required to be subject to hearings under the Commission on Appointments in order formally approved in their positions. Under the terms of the Republic Act No. 11939, The Deputy Chief of Staff has no fixed term length and is subject to mandatory military retirement once they reach the age of 57. The Deputy Chief of Staff is also eligible to be appointed as the Chief of Staff of the Armed Forces of the Philippines upon the pleasure of the president of the Philippines.

== Officeholders ==
The following list shows the officeholders of The Deputy Chief of Staff of the AFP:

No.	portrait	The Deputy Chief of Staff	Took office	Left office	Time in office	Service Branch	Ref.
1	Venancio Concepcion	Heneral de Division; Venancio Concepcion (March 20, 1843–June 12, 1912); Chief of General Staff	September 28, 1898	June 10, 1899	251 days	Philippine Revolutionary Army	
2	Paulino Santos	Brigadier General; Paulino Santos (1890–1945); Was not doing his function as was still work important projects with Bureau of Prisons but he was appointed so he will keep reporting to Camp Murphy	December 21, 1935	May 4, 1936	135 days	Philippine Constabulary	
3	Vicente Lim	Brigadier General; Vicente Lim (1888–1945); Gave up the position to command in the field	December 31, 1938	August 27, 1941	2 years, 239 days	Philippine Army	
4	Simeon de Jesus	Brigadier General; Simeon de Jesus (1890–1944); Commanded 51st Provisional Brigade	August 28, 1941	December 12, 1941	106 days	Philippine Army	
4	Macario Peralta Jr.	Brigadier General; Macario Peralta Jr. (1890–1945); Resigned in 1946	December 21, 1945	December 31, 1946	1 year, 10 days	Philippine Army	
5	Calixto Duque	Brigadier General; Calixto Duque (1893–1972)	December 31, 1946	December 31, 1949	3 years, 0 days	Philippine Army	
6	Jesus Vargas	Brigadier General; Jesus Vargas (1905–1994)	December 31, 1949	December 21, 1951	1 year, 355 days	Philippine Army	
7	Alfonso Arellano	Brigadier General; Alfonso Arellano (1905–1957)	December 21, 1951	December 31, 1953	2 years, 10 days	Philippine Army	
8	Pelagio Cruz	Brigadier General; Pelagio Cruz (1890–1945)	December 21, 1958	December 31, 1959	1 year, 10 days	Philippine Air Force	
9	Ricardo Papa	Brigadier General; Ricardo Papa (1912–1986)	December 21, 1962	December 31, 1963	1 year, 10 days	Philippine Army	
10	Nicanor Garcia	Major General; Nicanor Garcia (October 6, 1909–1971)	December 31, 1963	December 31, 1964	1 year, 0 days	Philippine Army	
11	Flaviano Olivares	Brigadier General; Flaviano Olivares (1911–1997)	December 21, 1965	December 21, 1967	2 years, 0 days	Philippine Constabulary	
12	Eugenio Acab	Brigadier General; Eugenio Acab	December 21, 1967	December 31, 1969	2 years, 10 days	Philippine Army	
13	Romulo Espaldon	Rear Admiral; Romulo Espaldon (1925–2005)	December 21, 1972	December 31, 1973	1 year, 10 days	Philippine Navy	
14	Rafael Ileto	Major General; Rafael Ileto (October 24, 1920–June 19, 2003)	December 31, 1973	December 31, 1975	2 years, 0 days	Philippine Army	
15	Eduardo Ermita	Major General; Eduardo Ermita (1935–2025)	March 5, 1986	December 31, 1988	2 years, 291 days	Philippine Constabulary	
16	Guillermo Flores	Major General; Guillermo Flores	December 31, 1988	December 31, 1990	2 years, 10 days	Philippine Army	
17	Lisandro Abadia	Major General; Lisandro Abadia (1938–2022)	December 31, 1988	December 31, 1989	1 year, 0 days	Philippine Army	
18	Napoleon Baylon	Rear Admiral; Napoleon Baylon	December 31, 1988	December 21, 1991	2 years, 355 days	Philippine Navy	
19	Alexander Aguirre	Major General; Alexander Aguirre	December 21, 1990	December 21, 1991	1 year, 0 days	Philippine Army	
20	Alfredo Filler	Major General; Alfredo Filler	December 21, 1991	December 21, 1993	2 years, 0 days	Philippine Army	
21	Arnulfo Acedera Jr.	Major General; Arnulfo Acedera Jr.	December 21, 1993	December 21, 1995	2 years, 0 days	Philippine Air Force	
22	Clemente Mariano	Major General; Clemente Mariano (1928–2017)	December 21, 1995	December 21, 1996	1 year, 0 days	Philippine Army	
23	Ismael Villareal	Major General; Ismael Villareal	December 21, 1997	December 21, 1998	1 year, 0 days	Philippine Army	
24	Luisito Fernandez	Rear Admiral; Luisito Fernandez	December 21, 1995	December 21, 1996	1 year, 0 days	Philippine Navy	
25	Jose Calimlim	Major General; Jose Calimlim	December 21, 1999	December 21, 2000	1 year, 0 days	Philippine Army	
26	Narciso Abaya	Lieutenant General; Narciso Abaya (born 1948)	December 8, 2001	June 5, 2002	179 days	] Philippine Army	
27	Ariston Delos Reyes	Vice Admiral; Ariston Delos Reyes (born 1950)	December 21, 2002	December 21, 2003	1 year, 0 days	Philippine Army	
28	Edilberto Adan	Lieutenant General; Edilberto Adan	December 21, 2004	December 31, 2005	1 year, 10 days	Philippine Army	
29	Mario Catacutan	Vice Admiral; Mario Catacutan	December 21, 2006	December 31, 2007	1 year, 10 days	Philippine Navy	
30	Rodrigo Maclang	Lieutenant General; Rodrigo Maclang	May 6, 2008	May 1, 2009	360 days	Philippine Army	
31	Eduardo Oban	Lieutenant General; Eduardo Oban (born 1955)	May 1, 2009	December 31, 2010	1 year, 244 days	Philippine Air Force	
32	Edgar Fallorina	Lieutenant General; Edgar Fallorina (born 1961)	December 21, 2011	December 31, 2012	1 year, 10 days	Philippine Air Force	
33	Erick Kagaoan	Vice Admiral; Erick Kagaoan	December 21, 2016	December 31, 2018	2 years, 10 days	Philippine Navy	
34	Gaudencio Collado	Vice Admiral; Gaudencio Collado	December 21, 2017	December 31, 2018	1 year, 10 days	Philippine Navy	
35	Rommel Anthony SD Reyes	Vice Admiral; Rommel Anthony SD Reyes served as acting Vice Chief of Staff	March 27, 2022	March 27, 2023	1 year, 0 days	Philippine Navy	
-	William Gonzales	Lieutenant General; William Gonzales (born 1967); Acting Capacity	January 22, 2023	March 27, 2023	64 days	Philippine Army	
36	Charlton Sean Gaerlan	Lieutenant General; Charlton Sean Gaerlan	March 28, 2023	October 16, 2024	1 year, 202 days	Philippine Marine Corps	
-	Augustine Malinit	Lieutenant General; Augustine Malinit; Acting Capacity	October 16, 2024	November 5, 2024	20 days	Philippine Air Force	
37	Jimmy D. Larida	Lieutenant General; Jimmy D. Larida	November 5, 2024	March 7, 2025	1 year, 306 days	Philippine Marine Corps	
38	Rommel P. Roldan	Lieutenant General; Rommel P. Roldan	March 7, 2025	May 19, 2026	1 year, 73 days	Philippine Air Force	
-	Arvin R. Lagamon	Lieutenant General; Arvin R. Lagamon; Acting Capacity	March 11, 2026	May 19, 2026	69 days	Philippine Army	-
39	Edmundo G. Peralta	Lieutenant General; Edmundo G. Peralta	May 19, 2026	Incumbent	111 days	Philippine Army	

== See also ==
- Armed Forces of the Philippines
- Chief of Staff of the Armed Forces of the Philippines
- Vice Chief of Staff of the Armed Forces of the Philippines
- Department of National Defense
