= Camp Atienza =

Philippine military base in Quezon City

Camp Gen. Rigoberto Atienza
- Santolan Barracks
- Located at Libis, Quezon City, Philippines

Site information
- Type: Military Base
- Owner: Philippines
- Controlled by: Philippine Army
- Condition: active, as of 2014

Location
- Coordinates: 14°36′56.52″N 121°4′37.56″E

Site history
- In use: 1979–present Philippines
- Materials: Concrete, Steel

Garrison information
- Past commanders: BGEN Erwin R. Salibad, AFP
- Garrison: 51st Engineering Brigade

Camp Gen. Rigoberto Atienza or Camp Atienza is a military base in Libis, Quezon City. It is named after the 9th Chief of Staff of the Armed Forces of the Philippines. It serves as the headquarters of the 51st Engineer Brigade, Philippine Army.

== History ==
Camp Rigoberto Atienza used to be the location of the Marikina Waterworks during the 19th century. Water from the Marikina River was pumped by the waterworks up the hills of Santolan, and by gravity the waters was brought via aqueduct to the El Deposito or currently the Pinaglabanan Shrine in San Juan City. During the Philippine Revolution and the Philippine–American War, the Marikina Waterworks was a strategic location which opposing forces tried to take over as this would give them control over the water supply to the 300,000 inhabitants of Manila.

During the Battle of Manila, the 1st Nebraska Volunteers Regiment along with the 1st Colorado Volunteers advanced from their position in Sta. Mesa and San Juan, towards the Marikina Waterworks encountering a unit of the Philippine Army. The skirmish ended with 78 Filipinos killed. The Nebraskans found the waterworks protected by fortress overlooking the Marikina Valley. The said encampment was named after the Commanding Officer of the 1st Nebraskans, Col. John M. Stotsenburg. This would be the first Fort Stotsenburg in the Philippines, until it was renamed Santolan Barracks. Another famous battles in the vicinity was the Battle of San Mateo where Gen. Henry Ware Lawton was killed fighting with the forces led by Licerio Gerónimo

Originally known as the "Santolan Barracks", the facility was renamed Camp General Rigoberto J Atienza on 8 October 1979 pursuant to GO Nr 377, GHQ AFP dated 6 June 1979 in honor of the first Engineer Officer to serve as AFP Chief of Staff and has served as a Second Lieutenant at the Old Santolan Barracks in Libis, Quezon City. Co-located with the brigade headquarters in Camp Atienza is the Headquarters and Headquarters Company and the Engineer Maintenance and Support Battalion (Provisional).

During Typhoon Ondoy, September 2009, extreme floods affected part of Camp Atienza due to unrelenting rains and the overflowing of the banks of the Marikina River. Despite that the camp was bordered by riprap stone against the river, it wasn't able to spare itself the brunt of mother nature.

The damaged facilities are as follows; WAC Quarters, Deputy Commander's Quarters, Office of the Command Communication, Electronics and Information Office (G6), the Officers’ Club House, and BOQ. The estimated cost of the damaged facilities and equipment was ₱1.8 million. The damage came after the new gate of the camp has been inaugurated.

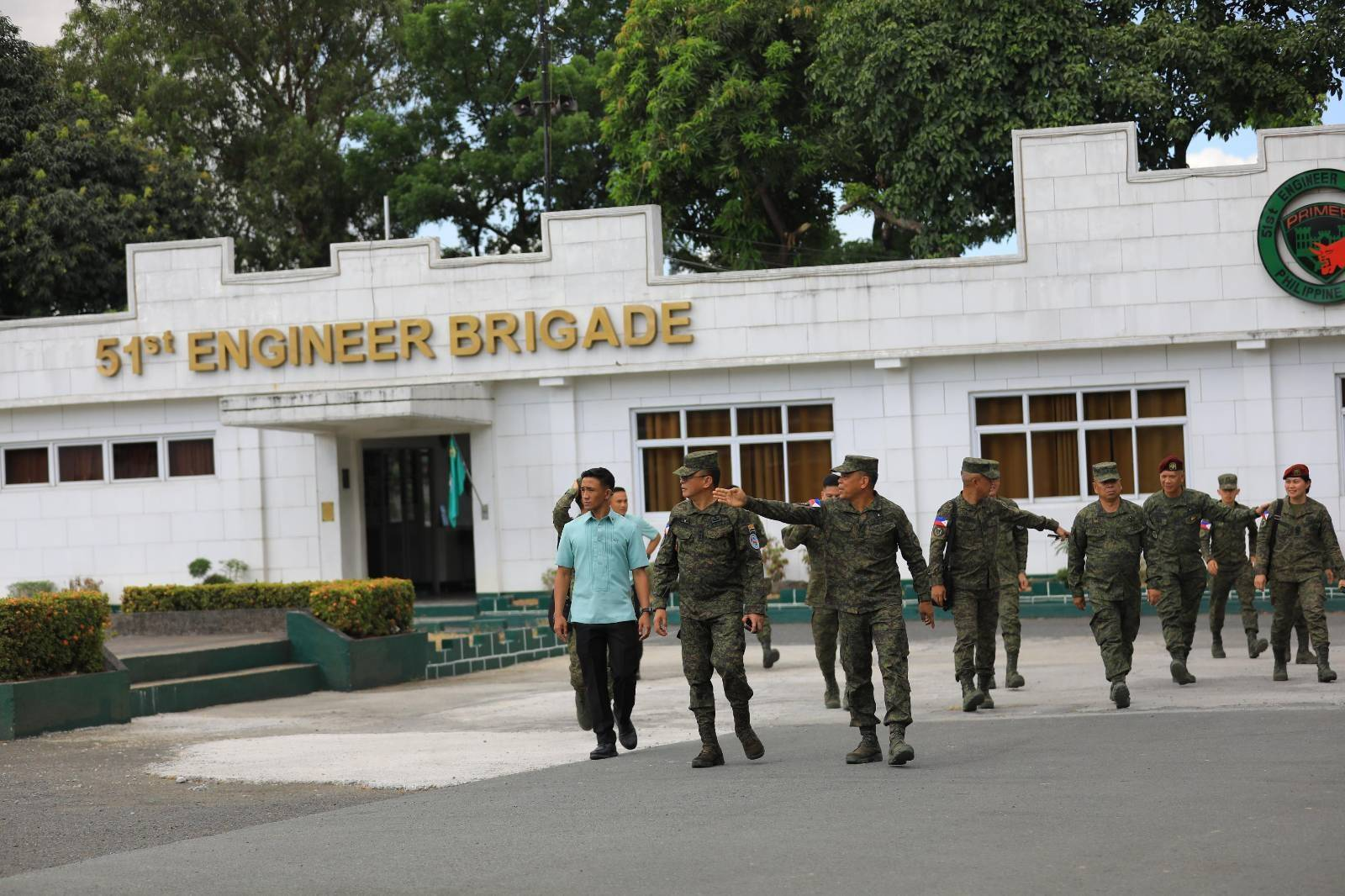
Lt. Gen. Antonio Nafarrete arrives at Camp Atienza for the activation ceremony of Task Force Engineer, May 8, 2026.

The camp's unit was put into action in the repair and restoration of not only the base's facilities but other affected parts of the Marikina Valley.

On May 8, 2026 Philippine Army Chief, Gen. Antonio Nafarrete, presided on the activation ceremony of Task Force Engineer, headed by the Commanding General of the 51st Engineering Brigade BGen. Erwin Salibad. The Task Force aims to ensure the speedy completion of pending construction projects of the Philippine Army for base development.

== Location ==
Camp Atienza is located on the banks of the Marikina River about a kilometer north of Eastwood City in Libis.

== Facilities ==
- 100m firing range
- Sarge Coffeeshop
- Officer's Club
- BOQ
- WAQ Quarters

== See also ==
- Philippine Army
- Camp Aguinaldo
