= Rafael Ileto =

Vice Chief of Staff of Philippine Armed Forces (1920–2003)

Rafael Manio Ileto
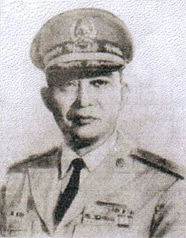
- Lt. Gen. Rafael M. Ileto, AFP

Secretary of National Defense
- In office November 23, 1986 – January 21, 1988
- Appointed by: Corazon Aquino
- Preceded by: Juan Ponce Enrile
- Succeeded by: Fidel V. Ramos

Ambassador to Thailand and Cambodia
- In office 1981–1986

Vice Chief of Staff of the Armed Forces of the Philippines
- In office 1975–1981
- Appointed by: Ferdinand Marcos
- Preceded by: Lieutenant General Romeo Espino
- Succeeded by: Major General Fidel V. Ramos
- Ambassador to Iran and Turkmenistan
- In office 1975–1978

The Deputy Chief of Staff of the Armed Forces of the Philippines
- In office 1973–1975
- President: Ferdinand Marcos Sr.
- Preceded by: Romulo Espaldon

Commanding General of the Philippine Army
- In office 1969–1972
- Preceded by: Ruben Maglaya
- Succeeded by: Rafael Zagala

Personal details
- Born: October 24, 1920 San Isidro, Nueva Ecija, Philippine Islands
- Died: June 19, 2003 (aged 82) Quezon City, Philippines
- Resting place: Libingan ng mga Bayani
- Spouse(s): Olga Clemena, Yrna Avelina Lopez Dulce
- Nickname(s): Rocky; Father of the Scout Rangers

Military service
- Allegiance: Republic of the Philippines
- Branch/service: Philippine Army
- Years of service: 1943–1949 United States Army; 1950–1978 Philippine Army
- Rank: Lieutenant General
- Unit: 1st Filipino Infantry Regiment; Alamo scouts 1st Scout Ranger Regiment
- Commands: Vice Chief of Staff, Armed Forces of the Philippines The Deputy Chief of Staff, Armed Forces of the Philippines Commanding General, Philippine Army
- Battles/wars: World War II; Invasion of Lingayen Gulf; Raid at Cabanatuan; Hukbalahap Rebellion

Rafael Manio Ileto (October 24, 1920 – June 19, 2003) was a Filipino general who served as the 22nd Secretary of the Department of National Defense (DND) of the Philippines. He also became the Vice Chief of Staff of the Armed Forces of the Philippines (AFP). He also served as Philippine Ambassador to Turkey, Iran, Cambodia, Thailand, and Laos.

== Early years ==
Rafael Ileto was born on October 24, 1920, in San Isidro, Nueva Ecija. He took up his primary education in his hometown, and finished his secondary education in Nueva Ecija High School in Cabanatuan.

Ileto married Olga, who died in 1989. Their son was Wilfredo. In 1994, he married Yrna Avelina Lopez Dulce.

Ileto then entered the University of the Philippines pursuing an Engineering degree for the first two years, but later entered the Philippine Military Academy in 1940. Topping his class in PMA, Ileto gained his appointment to the United States Military Academy in West Point, through the Foreign Cadet Program. He finished with the accelerated Class of 1943 (which actually graduated in 1942), along with prominent members such as Brig. Gen. Robin Olds, Maj. Gen. Harold Parfitt, Brig. Gen. Robert F. McDermott, and Gen. Bernard W. Rogers.

== Military and political career ==
Upon graduating from West Point, 2nd. Lt. Ileto entered the Infantry School for three months in Fort Benning, Georgia. From there he joined the 1st Filipino Infantry Regiment in Camp San Luis Obispo, California, which departed on September 19, 1943, to join the Pacific Theater of Operations - beginning with the New Guinea Campaign.

In New Guinea, Lt. Ileto transferred to the famed Alamo Scouts of the Sixth United States Army. With the Alamo Scouts, Ileto saw action in southern Samar during the Battle of Leyte, and thereafter in the Invasion of Lingayen Gulf on January 9, 1945.

On January 30, 1945, Lt. Ileto with the Alamo Scouts under the command of Lt. Col. Henry Mucci, successfully rescued 516 prisoners of war held by the Imperial Japanese Army's POW Camp in Cabanatuan, Nueva Ecija. This has become to date the most successful rescue mission of the United States Army, and is known as the Raid at Cabanatuan.

After the Liberation of Manila, Lt. Ileto married Ms. Olga Clemena at the Command and General Staff School in Fort Leavenworth, Kansas, while taking a short course for lower staff officers. He returned to the Philippines thereafter, and helped in rebuilding the post-war Philippine Military Academy.

In 1947, he was deployed to Okinawa, and took on early retirement from the service in 1949.

In 1950, he enlisted once more, with the Philippine Army this time, and was first assigned in the General Headquarters (GHQ). It was here that he met once more Gen. Alfonso Arellano, whom Ileto acquainted during World War II. Both officers came with the idea to constitute a special forces unit in the same fashion as that of the Alamo Scouts. Gen. Arellano gave the task to Ileto to organize the 1st Scout Ranger Regiment, which was established on November 25, 1950, at the Scout Ranger Training Unit (SRTU) in Fort Bonifacio. Capt. Ileto commanded the unit until 1955.

From commanding the Scout Ranger Regiment, Capt. Ileto was designated foreign affairs attaché to Saigon and Vientiane. After this diplomatic stint, he was assigned with once more to the GHQ J-2 Intelligence, as a staff officer. From there he was appointed as Operations Chief of the National Intelligence Coordinating Agency from 1959 to 1964.

He again went back for further studies in 1965 in the Command and General Staff College in Fort Leavenworth, and later joined the Armed Forces of the Philippines Command and General Staff College at Fort Bonifacio. Thereafter, he became Commanding General of the 1st PhilippineC Zone, covering all provinces north of Manila before being promoted to Deputy Chief of Staff for Intelligence (J-2) in 1969.

Col. Ileto once more returned to the United States to study under the Defense Resources Management Course at the University of Pittsburgh, Pennsylvania in 1969. From there Brig. Gen. Ileto was appointed Commanding General of the Philippine Army, a post which he held until 1971. When Pres. Ferdinand Marcos declared Martial Law on September 21, 1972, Ileto was one of the few generals who opposed the President, losing favor for the next series of promotions in the patronage politics that has already begun in the promotion system in the AFP.

In 1973, Ileto became Deputy Chief of Staff of the AFP was then promoted to Major General, then Vice Chief of Staff as a Lieutenant General from 1975 until his retirement in 1978. Concurrent to this position, Gen. Ileto also served as the Philippine Ambassador to Iran and Turkey from 1975 to 1980, and to Thailand, Cambodia, and Laos from 1980 to 1986.

During the People Power Revolution, Amb. Ileto played as mediator between the camp of Pres. Ferdinand Marcos and the opposition. Amb. Ileto was then appointed as Undersecretary of Defense by Pres. Corazon Aquino.

Upon the resignation of Juan Ponce Enrile after an alleged coup attempt against Pres. Corazon Aquino, Ileto was appointed as the Secretary National Defense on November 23, 1986. He resigned from this government position after a falling out with the President on January 21, 1988.

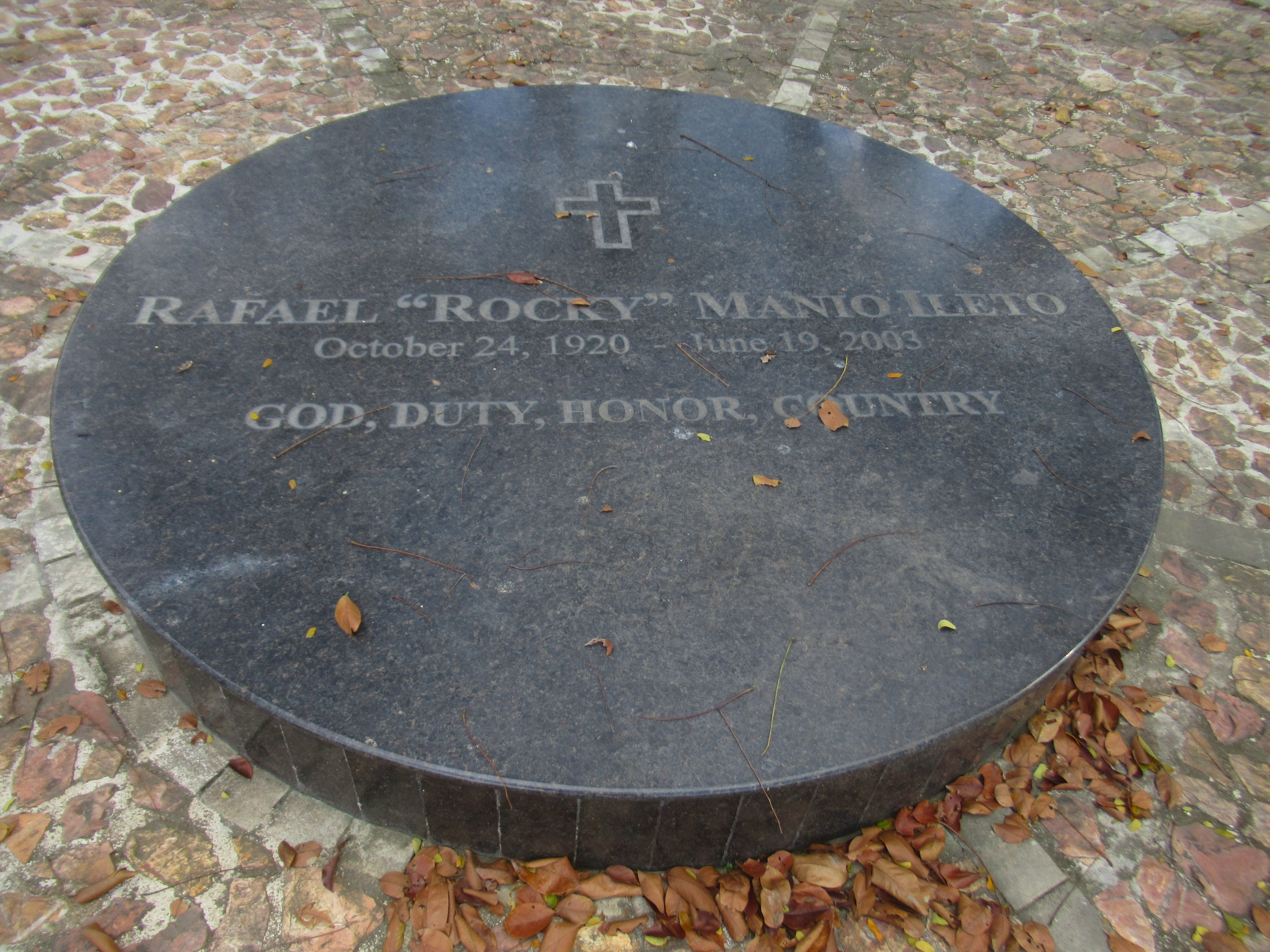
Ileto's grave at the Libingan ng mga Bayani.

== Later life ==
On June 19, 2003, Ileto died at the Philippine Heart Center after a heart attack at the age of 82. He was buried at the Libingan ng mga Bayani on June 23 with full military honors.

== See also ==
- Alamo Scouts
- 1st Scout Ranger Regiment

Military offices
Preceded by Ruben Maglaya	Commanding General of the Philippine Army; 1969-1972	Succeeded by Rafael Zagala
Political offices
Preceded by Juan Ponce Enrile	Secretary of National Defense; 1986-1988	Succeeded by Fidel Ramos
