= Rigoberto Atienza =

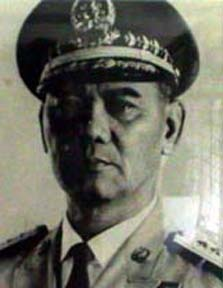

Chief of Staff of the Armed Forces of the Philippines
- In office July 13, 1965 – January 22, 1966
- President: Diosdado Macapagal
- Preceded by: Alfredo Santos
- Succeeded by: Ernesto Mata

Commanding General, Philippine Army
- In office June 1, 1964 – March 23, 1965
- President: Diosdado Macapagal
- Preceded by: Ernesto Mata
- Succeeded by: Ismael Lapus

Personal details
- Born: Rigoberto Joaquin Atienza; January 4, 1911 Manila, Manila
- Died: October 6, 1966 (aged 55) Manila, Manila
- Spouse: Eugenia Suarez-Atienza
- Relatives: Hermenegildo Atienza (brother); Lito Atienza (nephew)
- Education: Philippine Army Infantry School, Camp Murphy; Reserve Officer Service School; University of the Philippines
- Awards: US Legion of Merit; Distinguished Conduct Star; Distinguished Service Star; Military Merit Medal; Philippine Gold Cross

Military service
- Allegiance: Philippines
- Unit: 41st Infantry Division
- Commands: Armed Forces of the Philippines; Philippine Army; 42nd Infantry Regiment; 41st Engineer Battalion
- Battles/wars: Hukbalahap Campaign (1947–1957); Philippine Liberation Campaign (1944–1945); Guerilla Movement (1942–1945); Battle of Bataan (1941–1942)

Rigoberto Atienza (January 4, 1911– October 6, 1966) was a general of the Philippine Army who became 13th chief of staff of the Armed Forces of the Philippines and Commanding General of Philippine Army prior during the administration of President Diosdado Macapagal.

== Background ==
Rigoberto was born on January 4, 1911, from parents Buenaventura Atienza and Ponciana Joaquin in Manila. He has 5 brothers and 1 sister; all became professionals.

=== Military service ===
Atienza studied in University of Philippines and graduated with a degree in civil engineering. While in UP, Atienza in early 1931 became one of the founding members of Tau Alpha Fraternity, a fraternity for engineering students and one of the oldest university fraternities in Asia. He is also a member of UP ROTC Class 1933. He qualified for the Reserve Officers Service School (ROSS) in Baguio. He was commissioned as 3rd lieutenant in the reserves. He was integrated to Regular Army in 1938 and was overseer of the building activities in Camp Murphy (now Camp Aguinaldo). He graduated from Philippine Army Infantry School in Camp Murphy in 1941 and was promoted to captain. He was assigned as division engineer of 41st Infantry Division under General Vicente Lim.

=== World War II ===
At the outset of the war against Japan, he was named Division Inspector General in December 1941. He was put in charged by General Lim to ensure preparedness of each unit in the division. In February 1942, he was named as executive officer of 42nd Infantry Regiment and was promoted to Major. He was about to named as commanding officer of the 42nd Infantry when order came to surrender on April 9, 1942. He became POW when Bataan Force capitulated and surrendered by General King. He endured the Bataan Death March and reached Camp O'Donnell in Capas, Tarlac. He was released along with other Filipino soldiers in August of the same year.

=== Guerilla movement ===
Upon released he joined underground movement organized by General Lim and was active in contacting other units. When General Lim was captured he joined ROTC Hunters and became its operations officer. He has instrumental role on 11th US Airborne Division successful landing in Nasugbu, Batangas to liberated Manila in 1945.

==== Post war ====
After American give the Philippines its independence on 1946, Philippine Army was reorganized and Atienza was assigned as commander of Engineer Battalion. He was appointed by President Diosdado Macapagal as Commanding General, Philippine Army in 1964 replacing Brigadier General Ernesto S. Mata and later AFP Chief of Staff in 1965 replacing General Alfredo M. Santos. He is the first Engineer officer who served as Chief of Staff.

=== Personal life ===
Atienza married Eugenia Suarez on November 16, 1911 in Manila, Manila, Philippines. He died on December 8, 1966 in Manila due cancer and buried in Libingan ng mga Bayani in Fort Bonifacio. He wrote his experience during Bataan A Time of War: 105 days of Bataan published in 1985 by his wife.

=== Legacy ===
Camp in Libis, Quezon City, Metro Manila, previously named Santolan Barracks, was renamed after him on October 8, 1979, pursuant to General No. 377, GHQ AFP dated 6 October 1979. Camp Atienza is the home base of 51st Engineering Brigade.

== See also ==
- Camp Atienza
- 41st Infantry Division
