= Eulogio Balao =

Filipino soldier and politician

The Honorable Eulogio Balao PLH
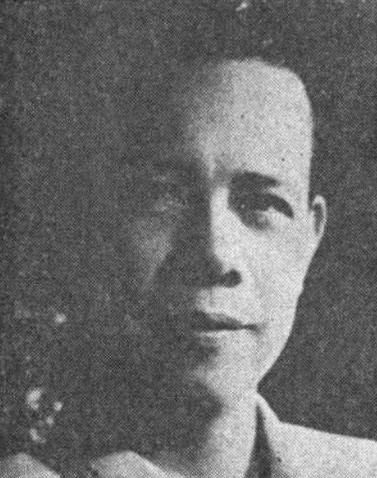
- Balao in 1960

Senator of the Philippines
- In office December 30, 1957 – December 30, 1963

Secretary of National Defense
- In office January 3, 1956 – August 28, 1957
- President: Carlos P. Garcia; Ramon Magsaysay
- Preceded by: Sotero Cabahug
- Succeeded by: Jesus M. Vargas

Vice Chief of Staff of the Armed Forces of the Philippines
- In office January 3, 1956 – August 28, 1957
- President: Ramon Magsaysay; Carlos Garcia
- Preceded by: Jesus Vargas
- Succeeded by: Alfonso Arellano

Military Attache, Philippine Embassy to China
- In office 1949–1953

Personal details
- Born: March 11, 1907 Tuguegarao, Cagayan, Philippine Islands
- Died: August 22, 1977 (aged 70) Tuguegarao, Cagayan, Philippines
- Party: Liberal (1963-1977)
- Other political affiliations: Nacionalista (1957-1963)
- Spouse: Carmen Cepeda
- Children: Praxedes, Julianita, Eulogio Jr., Ramon and Antonia
- Education: Philippine Constabulary Academy
- Profession: Soldier, Politician
- Awards: Distinguished Service Star; Legion of Honor
- Website: Philippine Senate Profile

Military service
- Branch/service: Philippine Army; Philippine Constabulary
- Years of service: 1931 - 1956
- Unit: 2nd Infantry Regiment, 1st Infantry Division (Regular) 11th Infantry Regiment, 11th Infantry Division (Reserve)
- Commands: Vice Chief of Staff, AFP; Military Attache, Nangking, China

Eulogio Balauitan Balao (March 11, 1907 – August 4, 1977) was a Filipino soldier and politician.

== Early life and education ==
The son of Matias Balao and Praxedes Balauitan, Balao was born in barrio Annafunan of Tuguegarao, Cagayan, on March 11, 1907. He graduated high school in Tuguegarao in 1926. He had five children with his wife, Carmen Cepeda.

== Career ==
Balao graduated from the Philippine Constabulary Academy in 1931 and joined the Philippine Constabulary. He was first stationed in Davao as third lieutenant. In 1935, he was severely injured during operations to suppress the Sakdal Uprising in Laguna, and was promoted to second lieutenant in 1936. That same year, he attended Officer School in Fort Benning, Georgia and became an ROTC instructor at the University of the Philippines. In 1937, he became executive officer of the 2nd Infantry Regiment and in 1940, became an instructor at the General Services School in Baguio.

During World War II, he served in the U.S. Army Forces Far East,. As a Major, Balao served as Donald Blackburn's Inspector General for his guerrilla force. He participated in the Battle of Bataan in 1942. As a commanding officer, he led 11th Infantry Battalion troops to a victorious engagement during the Battle of Bessang Pass in June 1945 against the Japanese troops of General Tomoyuki Yamashita. A few days later, he participated in the liberation of Aparri. Following the war, Balao, then a Colonel, turned his military efforts towards quelling the Hukbalahap forces of the Communist Party of the Philippines in Luzon. Thereafter, in 1949, Balao was assigned to service in Nanking, China as the Philippines' Military Attaché. In 1953, he became a brigadier general and in 1954 was appointed Vice Chief of Staff before, in 1956, assuming the office of Secretary of National Defense. Balao served in that capacity from January 3, 1956, to August 28, 1957. In 1957, he was elected to the Senate of the Philippines, where he remained until 1963.

Balao received a number of awards and honors throughout his career, including the Distinguished Service Star and induction into the Philippine Legion of Honor, where he was bestowed the rank of Commander.

Balao, who was closely identified with President Ferdinand Marcos, died in 1977.
