= Calixto Duque =

Filipino Chief of Staff of the Armed forces

Chief of Staff of the Armed Forces of the Philippines
- In office 1951–1953
- President: Elpidio Quirino
- Preceded by: Mariano Castañeda
- Succeeded by: Jesus Vargas

Vice-Chief of Staff of the Armed Forces of the Philippines
- In office 1949–1951
- President: Elpidio Quirino
- Preceded by: Mariano Castañeda
- Succeeded by: Jesus Vargas

Deputy Chief of Staff of the Armed Forces of the Philippines
- In office 1946–1949
- President: Manuel Roxas
- Preceded by: Macario Peralta
- Succeeded by: Jesus Vargas

Commander, I Military Area
- In office 1945–1946
- President: Sergio Osmeña

Personal details
- Born: Calixto Castillo Duque; October 14, 1893 Vintar, Ilocos Norte, Philippines
- Died: November 24, 1972 (aged 79) Quezon City, Philippines
- Education: Philippine Constabulary Academy (1917); University of the Philippines
- Profession: Soldier; Police officer
- Awards: Distinguished Conduct Star; Distinguished Service Star; Disting Service Star w/ 1st BAL; Philippine Legion of Honor; Silver Star; Legion of Merit; Legion of Merit w/ OLC; Long Service Medal w/2 BS; Long Service Medal w/3 BS; Mindanao Sulu Medal; Philippine Defense Medal; Philippine Liberation Medal; Anti-Dissident Campaign; American Defense Medal; Asiatic Pacific Theater Medal; World War II Victory Medal; Philippine Republic Presidential Unit Citation Badge; Distinguished Unit Citation Badge w/o OLC

Military service
- Allegiance: Philippines; United States (until 1946)
- Branch/service: Philippine Army; Philippine Constabulary
- Years of service: 1917–1953
- Rank: Major General
- Unit: AFP PA; USAFIP-NL; Mindanao Force; 81st Infantry Division 2nd Infantry Regiment
- Commands: Armed Forces of the Philippines 2nd Infantry Division; I Military Area; 61st Infantry Regiment; 2nd Infantry Regiment; Camp Luna, Cotabato; Planning Section, HQ, Philippine Army; Camp Del Pilar, Pampanga; Agusan PC Sulu PC
- Battles/wars: World War II; Philippines campaign (1941–1942); Philippines campaign (1944–1945); Battle of Bessang Pass; Battle of Baguio; Hukbalahap Rebellion; Korean War

Calixto Duque (October 14, 1893 – November 24, 1972) was a Filipino decorated military officer and a WW II veteran who served as Chief of Staff of the Armed Forces of the Philippines from 1951 to 1953 after his retirement. He also served as Vice Chief of Staff from 1949 to 1951 and Deputy Chief of Staff from 1946 to 1949.

== Background ==
He was born on October 14, 1893, at Vintar, Ilocos Norte to Venancio Duque and Angelo Castillo Duque where he is the brother to six siblings. He enrolled and took Bachelor of Arts at University of the Philippines and graduated in 1916. He was admitted to the Philippine Constabulary Academy in Camp Allen, Baguio in 1916 and graduated in 1917.

== Military Service ==
In 1917 Duque was commissioned as Third Lieutenant in the Philippine Constabulary. He was promoted to Second Lieutenant in 1919 and First Lieutenant in 1920. He served in Mindanao where he participated in the campaign against the Moro outlaws in 1923; he was appointed as assistant Provincial Commander of Sulu in 1927.

He was sent to the United States in 1927 and attended the Infantry School, Fort Benning, Georgia, and graduated the same year.

He was appointed as Provincial Commander of Agusan, 1927–32 and was promoted as Captain while in that post in 1931; he was appointed as post adjutant and instructor at Constabulary Academy in 1933; then appointed as Commandant of Cadets, Philippine Military Academy, 1936; he transferred to the Philippine Army and was appointed as Chief, Planning Section, Defense Plans Division, Philippine Army Headquarters. He was promoted to Major in 1937 and was sent to Field Artillery School at Fort Sill in Oklahoma, USA. He attended Command and General Staff College in Fort Leavenworth, Kansas, USA in 1938. He was then appointed as Assistant G3 at Headquarters, Philippine Army in 1939. When the 10 reserve divisions was activated in June 1941 upon activation of USAFFE, he was appointed as Chief of Staff of 81st Infantry Division based in Cebu. He replaced Colonel Fidel Segundo as commander of Camp Luna in Parang, Cotabato who was appointed as commandant of Philippine Military Academy. He was later appointed as commander of 2nd Infantry Regiment of 1st Regular Division in 1941 based in Camp Luna in Parang, Cotabato.

=== World War II ===
At the start of Japanese Invasion he was in command the 2nd Infantry Regiment based at Camp Luna in Parang, Empire Province of Cotabato in Mindanao island. He was placed under the command of 101st Infantry Division under Brigadier General Joseph Vachon. He led his undermanned regiment (less 3rd Battalion) in fighting the Japanese landing in Cotabato in April 1942. His unit initially had success delaying Kawaguchi detachment for 4 hours before they were forced to withdraw due to being low on ammunition and the withdrawal of 61st Infantry Regiment in his right flank. His regiment was posted under the command of General Guy O. Fort 's 81st Infantry Division based in Dansalan. Lack of artillery and air support doomed the forces in Mindanao Island.

He surrendered in Dansalan along with entire remnants of 81st Division in May 1942. He was a POW until paroled in August of the same year.

==== Guerilla Movement ====
He didn't wait long enough to join the guerillas and joined the USAFIP-NL under Colonel Moses and later by Russell Volckman. He was appointed as Operations Officer G3 of the said guerilla force in Northern Luzon area. He participated in the Battle of Bessang Pass where he was the one who planned the guerilla group's operations from San Fernando, La Union to Bessang Pass, Ilocos Sur. He interrogated Colonel Sotomu Terau, chief of staff of the 19th Tora Division.

=== Post War ===
He was appointed Commanding Officer of 2nd Infantry Division previously USAFIP-NL right after the hostilities ended in 1945. Duque was promoted to Colonel, he was appointed as Commander of I Military Area. He was appointed as Deputy Chief of the Philippine Army in 1946 and promoted to Brigadier General replacing Macario Peralta Jr. who resigned. He was appointed as Vice Chief of Staff of the Armed Forces later that year replacing Brigadier General Mariano Castañeda Sr., who was promoted as Chief of Staff. With the new Secretary of Defense Ramon Magsaysay at helm, he removed deadwood officers in the Armed Forces along with General Castañeda who he could not work along, he recommend Castañeda be replace as Chief of Staff. President Elpidio Quirino appointed Duque as acting Chief of Staff and sent Castañeda to the United States. Duque was appointed permanent chief of staff of the Armed Forces in March 1951 to 1953 until his retirement.

== Personal life ==
He married Estela Foronda Pacis, they had 6 children together. He died on November 24, 1972, in Quezon City and was buried at Libingan ng mga Bayani at Taguig, Rizal.

He was a member of the Knights of Columbus, and was president of the Baguio Bachelors' Club.

== See also ==
- List of Chief of Staff of Armed Forces of the Philippines
- Battle of Mindanao, WW2 (1941)
- Visayas-Mindanao Force
- Mindanao Force
