= Ernesto Mata =

Retired and deceased Filipino general

Ernesto S. Mata
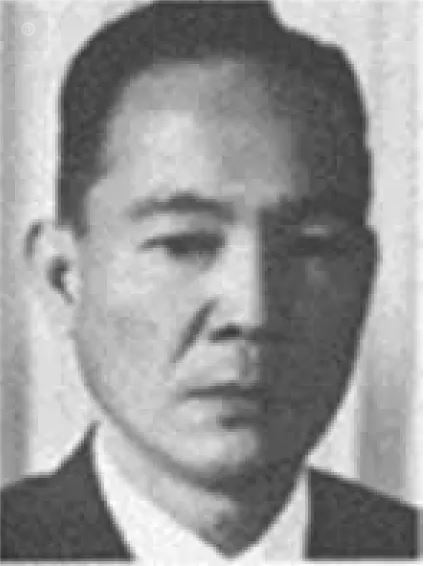
- Ernesto Mata as Defense Secretary in 1968

Secretary of National Defense
- In office January 21, 1967 – February 3, 1970
- President: Ferdinand Marcos
- Preceded by: Macario Peralta
- Succeeded by: Juan Ponce Enrile

Chief of Staff, Armed Forces of the Philippines
- In office January 22, 1966 – January 21, 1967
- President: Ferdinand Marcos
- Preceded by: Rigoberto Atienza
- Succeeded by: Victor Osias

Commanding General, Philippine Army
- In office September 1, 1963 – June 1, 1964
- President: Diosdado Macapagal
- Preceded by: Alfredo Santos
- Succeeded by: Rigoberto Atienza

Personal details
- Born: November 7, 1915 Laoag, Ilocos Norte, Philippine Island
- Died: March 7, 2012 (aged 96) Quezon City, Philippines
- Education: University of the Philippines; Philippine Constabulary Academy; Command and General Staff College
- Alma mater: Philippine Constabulary Academy
- Profession: Soldier
- Awards: Distinguished Service Star; Military Commendation Medal; Philippine Legion of Honor; Legion of Merit; Crosses of Military Merit

Military service
- Allegiance: Philippines
- Branch/service: Philippine Army
- Years of service: 1937 – 1967
- Rank: General
- Battles/wars: World War II; Hukbalahap Rebellion

Ernesto S. Mata (November 7, 1915 – March 7, 2012) was a Filipino General and the 15th Secretary of National Defense of the Republic of the Philippines, serving in that capacity from 21 January 1967 to 3 February 1970.

Mata was also a former Armed Forces of the Philippines Chief of Staff, the only retired officer to be recalled to active duty to occupy this position. In February 2012, just before his death, he was acknowledged to be the only known living graduate of the Philippine Constabulary Academy, which was later renamed the Philippine Military Academy in 1935.

== Biography ==
=== Early life ===
Mata was born on 7 November 1915 in Laoag, Ilocos Norte. In 1933 he graduated from Ilocos Norte High School and took further education at the University of the Philippines Junior College at Vigan, Ilocos Sur. He passed the Philippine Constabulary Academy entrance exam a year later, graduating in March 1937. That same year, he became a Third Lieutenant and was assigned with the 23rd Philippine Constabulary Company in Iloilo City.

=== World War II ===
During World War II he fought in the United States Army Forces in the Far East and was a commanding officer for the 3rd Battalion, 74th Infantry Regiment in Negros. From 1942 to 1945, instead of surrendering to the Imperial Japanese Army, he led the 72nd Division of the 7th Military District on the island of Negros and assisted in the liberation of the Philippines from the Japanese invaders. He served as aide-de-camp for President Sergio Osmeña when he returned from exile. He later completed the Infantry Officer's Advanced Course at Fort Benning, Georgia and the Command and General Staff College course at Fort Leavenworth, Kansas.

=== Post War era ===
When World War II ended, Mata began studying at the Institute of Foreign Affairs at the Department of Foreign Affairs. He attended the Harvard Advance Management Programs in Baguio in 1958. On June 16 of that year, he became Military Assistant to Jesus Vargas who then was Defense Secretary. Two years later, he took a course in Modern Weapon Familiarization at Fort Bliss, Texas and the same year made tours of various armies of Greece, Italy, and Spain.

=== 1960-1970 ===
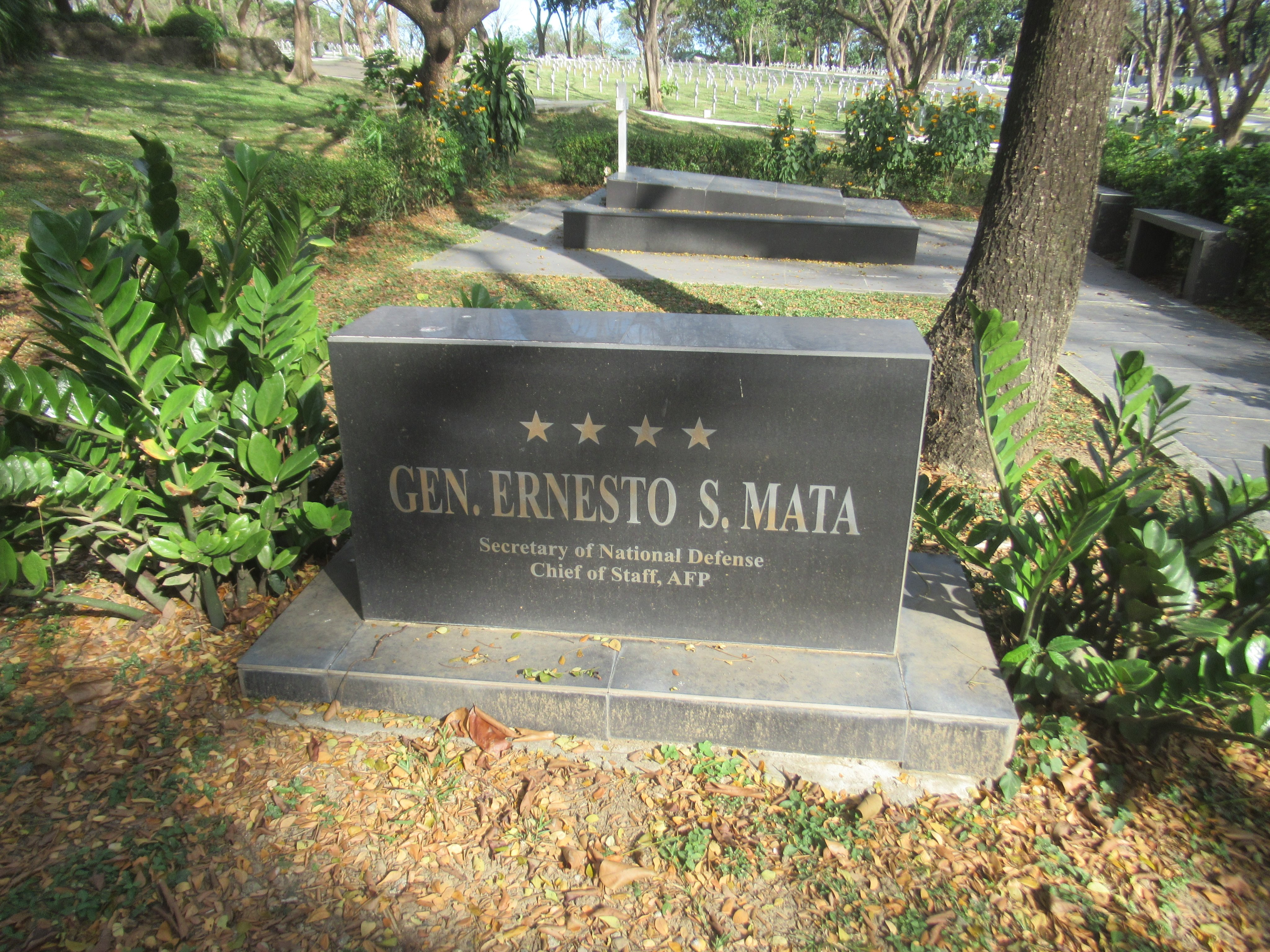
Mata's grave at the Libingan ng mga Bayani.

In March 1962, he became commander of the 1st Infantry Division of the Philippine Army and on 24 June 1963, became their commanding general. He was promoted during President Diosdado Macapagal's term to Brigadier General a month later. He retired in June 1964 but was recalled to duty on 22 January 1966 by President Ferdinand Marcos and was appointed as Chief of Staff of the Armed Forces of the Philippines. He also became Southeast Asia Treaty Organization Military advisor and when he finally retired from the military on 21 January 1967, he was appointed as Secretary of National Defense. In 1970, he was replaced by Juan Ponce Enrile, Jr. as the acting Defense Secretary. He served without receiving a salary, relying only on his pension as a retired general. He was able to collect his accumulated salary as Defense Secretary in September 1972, more than two years after he relinquished the post.
