= Ariston Delos Reyes =

Retired Philippine vice admiral (born 1950)

Undersecretary for Internal Affairs, Department of National Defense
- In office January 2007 – March 2010
- President: Gloria Macapagal-Arroyo

Vice Chief of Staff of the Armed Forces of the Philippines
- In office July 7, 2004 – February 16, 2006
- President: Gloria Macapagal-Arroyo
- Preceded by: Rodolfo Garcia
- Succeeded by: Antonio Romero II

Deputy Chief of Staff of the Armed Forces of the Philippines
- In office 2003–2004
- President: Gloria Macapagal-Arroyo
- Preceded by: Ernesto Carolina
- Succeeded by: Edilberto Adan

Personal details
- Born: February 16, 1950 (age 76) San Rafael, Bulacan
- Profession: Author Public Servant Sailor
- Awards: Philippine Legion of Honor; Distinguished Navy Cross

Military service
- Allegiance: Republic of the Philippines
- Branch/service: Philippine Navy
- Years of service: 1971 – 2006
- Rank: Vice Admiral

Ariston V. Delos Reyes (born February 16, 1950) is a retired vice admiral in the Armed Forces of the Philippines.

== Education ==
Delos Reyes graduated salutatorian from Florentino Torres High School, Tondo, Manila in 1966. Thereafter, he went to study BS Mathematics at the University of the Philippines Diliman as a National Science Development Board (NSDB) scholar. However, after one year, he opted to enter the Philippine Military Academy where he graduated No. 2 out of 108 cadets and received a special award for being number one in Mathematics in 1971. He also attended the Naval Staff Course at the Naval War College, New Port, Rhode Island, USA and General Staff Course at the Naval Command College, South Korea. He also earned a master's degree in National Security Administration, with honors, from the National Defense College of the Philippines.

== Short stint at DND ==
A day after his retirement from military service, Vice Admiral Delos Reyes was appointed as Presidential Assistant I, with the rank of Undersecretary. He was given the opportunity to continue his career in public service through the Department of National Defense, where he was initially tasked to assist in defense acquisitions to implement the AFP Modernization Program.

During his three-year stint at the DND, VAdm Delos Reyes chaired the investigations of alleged anomalies in bidding of AFP equipment, including the Night Capable Attack Helicopters (NCAH) and mortar acquisition projects. He also pushed for the adoption of comprehensive DND-wide Integrity Development Action Plan (IDAP) in cooperation with the Development Academy of the Philippines and the Office of the Ombudsman, as well as the ISO accreditation of selected DND bureaus and offices.

== Awards ==
He earned 57 medals, including among others, seven Distinguished Service Stars, one Philippine Legion of Honor (Degree of Commander), two Philippine Legion of Honor (Degree of Officer), five Outstanding Achievement Medals, Distinguished Navy Cross, two Bronze Cross Medals, 19 Military Merit Medals, nine Military Commendation Medals.

He was also recipient of the following awards:

- Gawad sa Kaunlaran – For coming up with a proposal which led in the grant of laundry allowance to all AFP and PNP personnel effective January 1998, a benefit package worth about P 100 million per annum.
- Monetary Incentive Award (DND, 1991) – For discovering an error in computation of the unit price of URC 187 radio which resulted in overpayment of Vetronix by the AFP, the rectification of which resulted in government savings of more than P 3.8 million.
- Congratulatory Letter from the Secretary of National Defense dated February 7, 1991 – For having garnered a grade of 95.6 percent and ranking of number 5 out of 24,895 examinees who passed the Civil Service Eligibility Test (Professional). A total of 241, 552 individuals took the examination.
- Cavalier Award (PMAAA) for Military Professionalism in Naval Operations (CY 2000) – as Commander Naval Task Force 61, Zamboanga City from 23 March 1997 – 29 October 1998.
- NDCP Meritorious Service Award (2007)

== Publications ==
He authored the manual “Lessons Learned from AFP Operations Against the Communist Party of the Philippines -- New People’s Army” Volume II.

He was co-author of “Lessons Learned from AFP Operations Against the Communist Party of the Philippines – New People’s Army” Volume I and “Typhoon Doctrine for Mariners”.
