= Manuel Cabal =

Manuel F. Cabal

Chief of Staff, Armed Forces of the Philippines
- In office 1959–1961
- President: Carlos P. Garcia
- Preceded by: Alfonso Arellano
- Succeeded by: Pelagio Cruz

Chief, Philippine Constabulary
- In office 1956–1957
- President: Ramon Magsaysay
- Preceded by: Florencio Selga
- Succeeded by: Pelagio Cruz

Personal details
- Born: Manuel Fiel Flores Cabal; December 2, 1910 Botolan, Zambales
- Died: 1987 (aged 76–77)
- Spouse: Elisa Cabal
- Profession: Constable; Army
- Awards: US Legion of Merit

Military service
- Allegiance: Philippines; United States of America
- Branch/service: Philippine Army; Philippine Constabulary
- Years of service: 1928 - 1961
- Battles/wars: Hukbalahap Campaign; Battle of Bataan

Manuel Cabal (December 2, 1910 - 1987) is a Filipino Lieutenant General who served as Chief of Staff of the Armed Forces of the Philippines from 1958 - 1960. He also served as Chief of Philippine Constabulary from 1957 - 1958.

== Early life ==
Cabal was born on December 2, 1910, in Botolan, Zambales to father Macario Cabal and mother Mercedes Flores.

== Military service ==
Cabal attended Philippine Constabulary Academy and graduated in 1928. He was a Constabulary Officer, until he transferred to 21st Infantry Division in Bataan. He fought the Japanese and became a POW after the fall of Bataan. He was released after 3 months and joined guerilla movement. After the war he rejoined the Philippine Constabulary in 1945 upon Philippine liberation.

In 1956, President Ramon Magsaysay appointed him as Chief of the Philippine Constabulary. After General Alfonso Arellano died in office in 1958, Cabal was appointed by President Carlos P. Garcia as Chief of Staff, Armed Forces.

== Legacy ==
He retired in 1961 and was replaced by Lieutenant General Pelagio Cruz. He died in 1987 due to prostate cancer. Police Camp in Zambales was named after him.

== See also ==
- Chief of Staff, Armed Forces of the Philippines
- Philippine Constabulary
- Chief of Philippine Constabulary

Military offices
Preceded by Alfonso Arellano	Chief of Staff of the Armed Forces of the Philippines; 1959 to 1961	Succeeded by Pelagio Cruz
Preceded by Florencio Selga	Chief, Philippine Constabulary; 1957 - 1959	Succeeded by Pelagio Cruz
