= Jesus Vargas (general) =

Filipino military official (1905–1994)

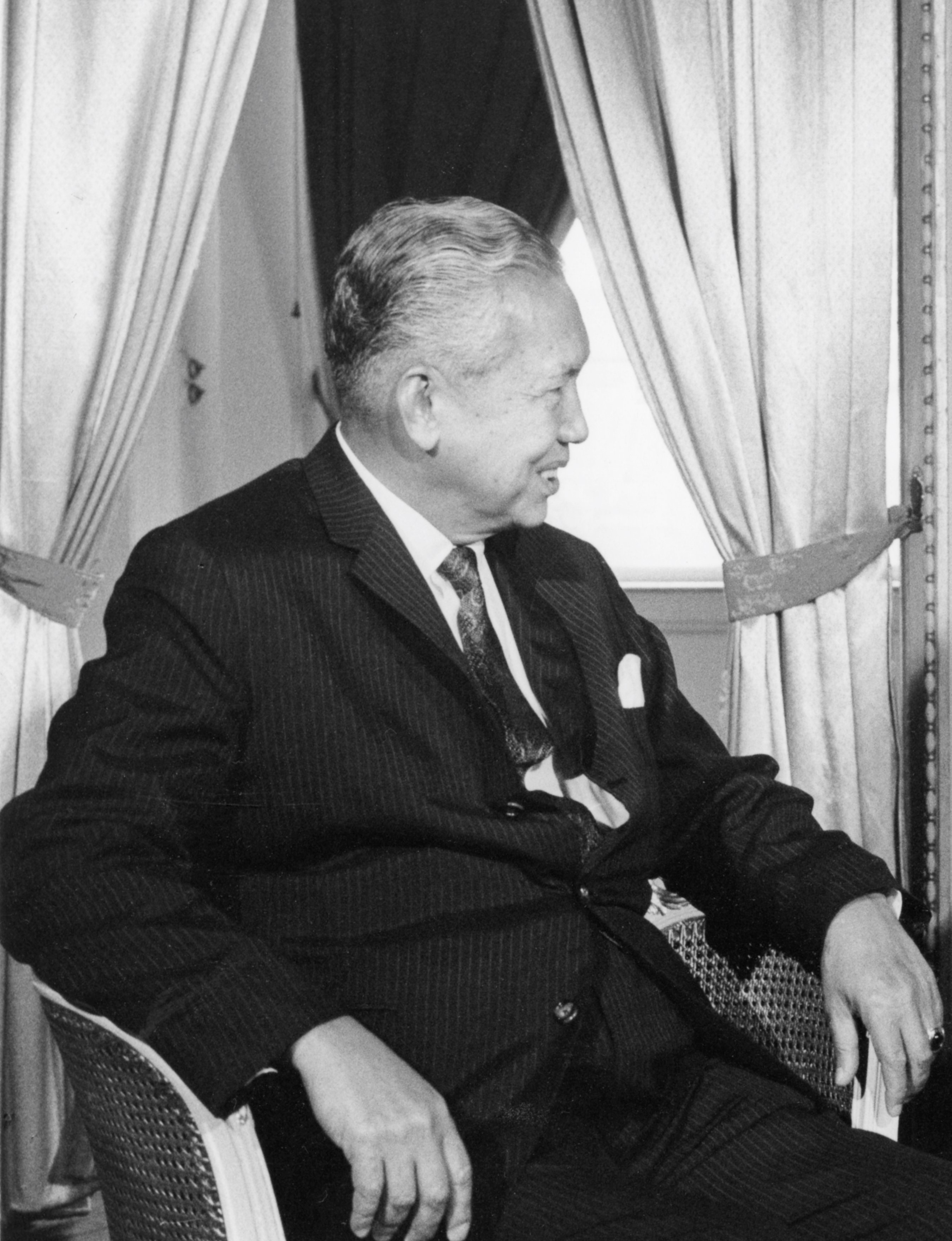
- General Jesus Vargas in Bangkok, 1969

Secretary General of the Southeast Asia Treaty Organization
- In office July 1, 1965 – September 5, 1972
- Preceded by: Konthi Suphamongkhon
- Succeeded by: Sunthorn Hongladarom

Secretary of National Defense
- In office August 28, 1957 – May 18, 1959
- President: Carlos P. Garcia
- Preceded by: Sotero Cabahug
- Succeeded by: Alejo Santos

Chief of Staff of the Armed Forces of the Philippines
- In office December 30, 1953 – December 29, 1956
- President: Ramon Magsaysay
- Preceded by: Calixto Duque
- Succeeded by: Alfonso Arellano

Vice-Chief of Staff of the Armed Forces of the Philippines
- In office January 11, 1951 – May 4, 1953
- President: Elpidio Quirino

Deputy Chief of Staff of the Armed Forces of the Philippines
- In office December 31, 1949 – December 21, 1951
- President: Elpidio Quirino

Personal details
- Born: Jesus Miranda Vargas; March 22, 1905 Manila, Philippine Islands
- Died: March 25, 1994 (aged 89)
- Citizenship: Filipino
- Party: Progressive (1959)
- Education: Philippine Constabulary Academy (BS)
- Alma mater: Field Artillery School; US Command Staff College
- Awards: Gold Cross * Distinguished Service Star, *Long Service medal * Military Commendation ribbon * Army Commendation ribbon *Philippine Republic Presidential citation badge *Distinguished Unit Badge *Luzon Campaign medal * Philippine Defense medal and ribbon * Philippine Liberation medal and ribbon * Anti-dissidence Campaign ribbon * American Defense Services medal and ribbon * Asiatic-Pacific War Theater Campaign medal and ribbon * World War II Victory medal and ribbon * Order of Military Merit (Taiguk), Republic of Korea *Order of the White Elephant, Thailand * Military Merit Medal (degree of the commander).

Military service
- Branch/service: Philippine Army; Philippine Constabulary
- Years of service: 1937–1956 (PA); 1929–1937 (PC)
- Rank: Lieutenant General
- Battles/wars: World War II; Hukbalahap rebellion

Jesus Miranda Vargas (22 March 1905 – 25 March 1994) was a retired Filipino lieutenant general who served as Secretary of National Defense and Chief of Staff of the Armed Forces of the Philippines. In his later years, he was the Secretary-General of Southeast Asia Treaty Organization (SEATO) which was based in Bangkok, Thailand.

== Early life ==
Jesus Miranda Vargas was born on March 22, 1905, in Manila to Braulio Vargas and Petrona Miranda.

He finished his Bachelor of Science at the Philippine Constabulary Academy in 1929. He also graduated from the Field Artillery School in Fort Sill, Oklahoma in 1940 and the Command and General Staff College, Fort Leavenworth, Kansas in 1947.

== Military career ==
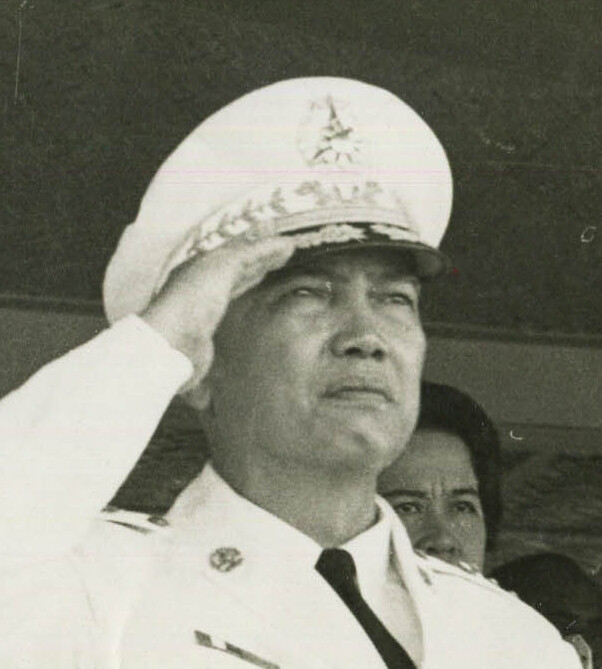
Vargas as Chief of Staff of the Armed Forces of the Philippines

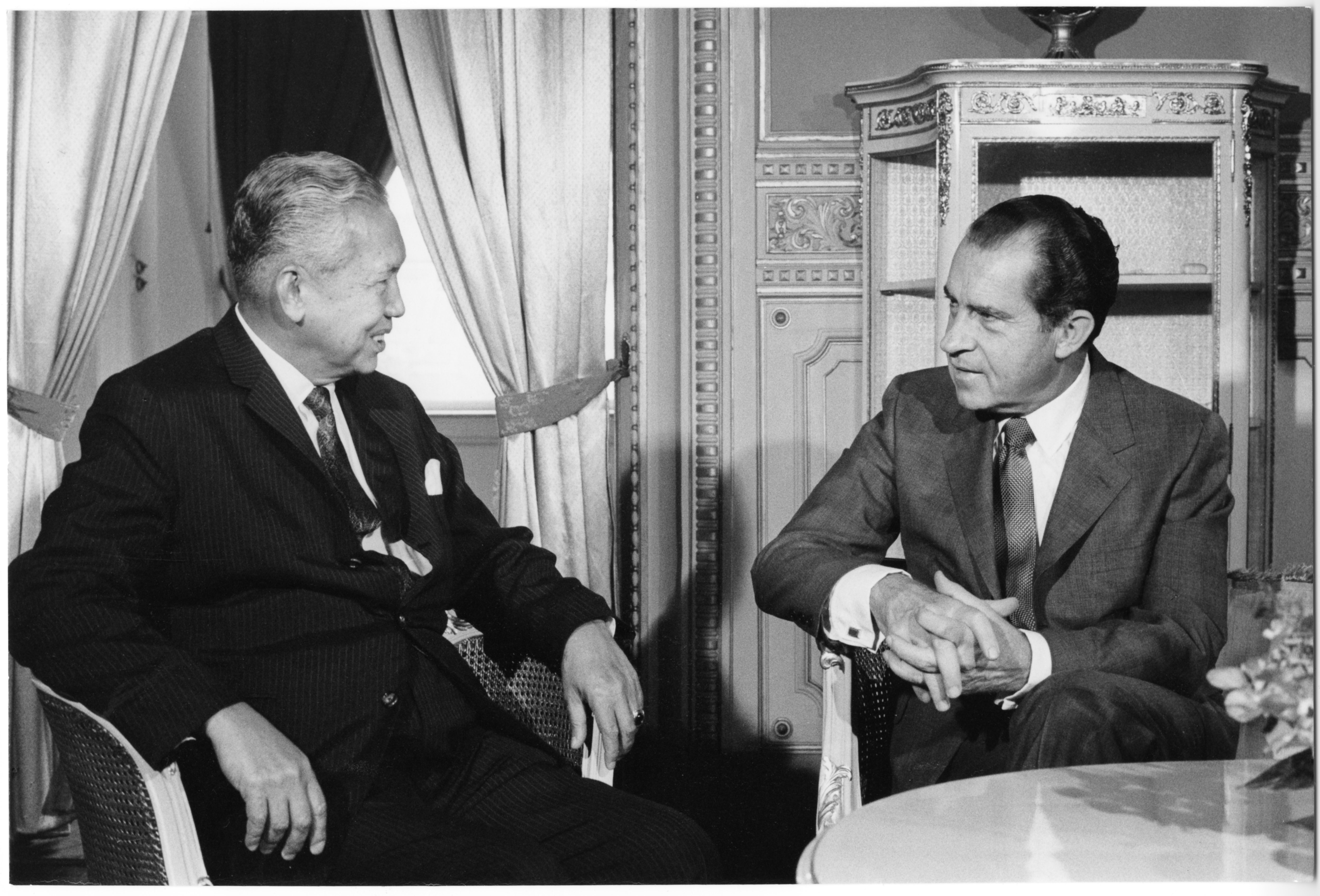
Vargas with US President Richard Nixon in 1969

Vargas was a World War 2 veteran. He served in the Philippine Army from 1937 to 1951.

PC, 1930–1935; aide-de-camp to the Philippine President and Commanding Officer, President Guard Battalion, 1943; Executive Officer, Ground Force, 1947–1948; Superintendent, Manila ROTC, 1948–1949; Commander, 5th Battalion Combat Team (Huk campaign), 1949–50; Deputy Chief of Staff, AFP 1950–1951; Vice Chief of Staff, AFP, 1951–1953; Chief of Staff, AFP, 1953–1956; military adviser, Southeast Asia Treaty Organization (SEATO), 1954–1956; retired Lieutenant General, Armed Forces of the Philippines; Secretary of National Defense, 1957–1959;

board chairman, National Waterworks & Sewerage Authority, 1957–59; president, Philippine American Management & Financing Company, 1961–65; chairman of the Board of Trustees, Ramon Magsaysay Award Foundation, 1962–65; and secretary-general, SEATO, 1965–72.

=== Medals and awards ===
Gold Cross, Distinguished Service Star, Long Service medal, Military Commendation ribbon, Army Commendation ribbon, Philippine Republic Presidential citation badge, Distinguished Unit Badge. Luzon Campaign medal, Philippine Defense medal and ribbon, Philippine Liberation medal and ribbon, Anti-dissidence Campaign ribbon, American Defense Services medal and ribbon, Asiatic-Pacific War Theater Campaign medal and ribbon, World War II Victory medal and ribbon, Order of Military Merit (Taiguk), Republic of Korea; Order of the White Elephant, Thailand; and Military Merit Medal (degree of the commander).

== Personal life ==
Vargas was married to Rosalina Morillo in 1931 and had four children. Their names are Jesus Jr., Nandy, Francisco, Teresa and Baby Vargas.

== See also ==
- Department of National Defense (Philippines)
- Armed Forces of the Philippines
