= Chief of Staff of the Armed Forces of the Philippines =

Head of the Armed Forces of the Philippines

- Emblem of the Armed Forces of the Philippines

- Flag of the Chief of Staff of the Armed Forces of the Philippines

- Incumbent; Gen. Antonio Nafarrete PA since July 21, 2026
- Reports to: Secretary of National Defense; President of the Philippines
- Residence: Camp General Emilio Aguinaldo, Quezon City, Philippines
- Seat: Camp General Emilio Aguinaldo, Quezon City
- Appointer: The president; with the consent of the Commission on Appointments
- Term length: 3 years; can be extended with the approval of Congress
- Constituting instrument: Republic Act No. 11939
- Formation: December 21, 1935
- First holder: Jose de los Reyes
- Unofficial names: Chairman of the Joint Chiefs
- Deputy: Vice Chief of Staff of the Armed Forces of the Philippines (assistant); The Deputy Chief of Staff of the Armed Forces of the Philippines (administrative and organizational duties)
- Website: Armed Forces of the Philippines

The Chief of Staff of the Armed Forces of the Philippines (CSAFP) is the highest ranking military officer and the head of the Armed Forces of the Philippines. The position is usually held by a four-star rank general or admiral. Its direct equivalent in the US Armed Forces is the Chairman of the Joint Chiefs of Staff.

The holder of this position is appointed by, as well as directly reports to the president of the Philippines under the Article VII, Section 18 of the 1987 Constitution. He executes the president's commands, tactics, operations, plannings, and strategies, as well as serves as the immediate adviser to the secretary of national defense. He also prescribes directions to all commands (including the commanding general of the Philippine Army, the commanding general of the Philippine Air Force, the flag officer-in-command of the Philippine Navy, the commanders of the AFP Combatant Commands, and the AFP Board of Generals).

The Armed Forces of the Philippines were created as a result of the Commonwealth Act No. 1, also known as the National Defense Act of 1935. However, the origin of the organization can be traced back to the establishment of the Philippine Constabulary, armed Filipino forces organized in 1901 by the United States to combat the Philippine Revolutionary Army then led by General Emilio Aguinaldo.

== History ==
The position of the chief of staff has been traced from the commanding general of the Philippine Army, when the Philippine Commonwealth Army (now the Philippine Army) was established as the main army of the Commonwealth of the Philippines. After the defeat of the First Philippine Republic during the Philippine–American War, the United States dissolved the army and relied on its armed forces together with some Filipino troops under the Philippine Constabulary. However, the National Defense Act of 1935 led to take on responsibilities on national defense and pave way for the creation of three major commands (Army, Air Force, Navy). Since the 1960s, the rosters of the chiefs of staff is arranged accordingly.

On June 19, 2020, under the DND Order no. 174, the title of chief of staff was renamed as the chairman of the joint chiefs, while the vice-chief of staff as vice-chairman of the joint chiefs, and the deputy chief of staff as chief of the joint staff. Although the usage of these titles were deferred.

== Organization and term limit ==
The Chief of Staff of the AFP is assisted by the Vice-Chief of Staff of the AFP (VCSAFP) and The Deputy Chief of Staff of the AFP (TDCSAFP), both holders of the rank of lieutenant general/vice admiral. The Vice-Chief of Staff serves as the primary assistant of the Chief of Staff of the AFP in their operational duties, as well as in policy conceptualization and implementation matters in the AFP, and also assists the Chief of Staff of the AFP in their absence. The Deputy Chief of Staff (TDCS) is tasked to supervise the organizational staff, including the Joint Staff, the Special Staff, the Administrative and the Technical Staff. The Deputy Chief of Staff is also responsible for assisting the AFP's overall policy and strategy formations, and perform other duties assigned by the Chief of Staff of the AFP. These posts are also assisted by the secretary joint staff (SJS), who serves as the executive officer for the Chief of Staff, the VCS, and TDCS. The Chief of Staff of the AFP is also advised on enlisted personnel matters by the Armed Forces of the Philippines Sergeant Major (AFPSM).

The Chief of Staff of the AFP has no definite or fixed term limit, under Republic Act No. 8186, as the term limit of the Chief of Staff of the AFP, along with all uniformed members of the AFP, has a mandatory retirement age at 56 years old. Nevertheless, the Chief of Staff of the AFP's term can be extended and allows a flexible term while serving beyond the mandatory retirement age, as the Chief of Staff of the AFP can serve their post until 3 years. Plans to reform the current system were made in 2011, but was vetoed by then-President Benigno Aquino III. An updated bill is currently being crafted since 2020, which aims to create a fixed term of 3 years for the Chief of Staff of the AFP, the VCS, TDCS, the commanders of the three major services (Army, Navy, Air Force), the commanders of the combatant commands (NOLCOM, SOLCOM, WESCOM, VISCOM, WESTMINCOM, EASTMINCOM), the Commandant of the Philippine Marine Corps, the Commander of the AFP Joint Special Operations Command, and the Commander of the upcoming Cyber Security Command; while the Superintendent of the Philippine Military Academy (PMA) will have a 4-year term in their post, and will not be allowed to be reappointed in other higher posts. The bill also allows the president to remove the sitting Chief of Staff of the AFP at his/her pleasure within their 3-year term. Once passed and enacted into law, the new law aims to increase the flexibility, organizational professionalism and effectiveness in their respective roles. On May 16, 2022, President Rodrigo Duterte signed the Republic Act No. 11709, which serves as the new law that enables a three-year fixed term for key officials of the Armed Forces of the Philippines, including the Chief of Staff of the AFP.

=== Fixed-term issues under R.A. No. 11709 ===
Months after the signing of the new term law, reports were being made on the possible rumbling in the AFP hierarchy due to the complications caused by the Republic Act No. 11709 from the promotions of younger officers and to the reduction of promoted officers within the senior officers rank (major-colonel/lieutenant commander-captain) due to the reduced tenure limits, which caused anxiety regarding the lowering of a merit-based promotion system. The issue also got more friction from an editorial article written by former AFP spokesman Major General Edgard Arevalo PN(M) (Ret.) in The Manila Times named "The fates of two AFP chiefs of staff", which tackles about the appointment of Lieutenant General Bartolome Vicente Bacarro as AFP chief, who is retiring earlier than his predecessor General Andres Centino, which makes Centino's position higher than Bacarro's. Due to these problems, a revised law was crafted to solve the problems, which led to the ratification of Republic Act no. 11939, which was signed by President Bongbong Marcos on May 17, 2023. Under the new law, the reduced number of officials who will have a fixed term to only five, namely the chief of staff of the Armed Forces of the Philippines (three-year tenure); the commanding general of the Philippine Army, the commanding general of the Philippine Air Force, the flag officer-in-command of the Philippine Navy (two-year tenure) and the superintendent of the Philippine Military Academy (four-year tenure). The law also allows their fixed terms to be completely terminated upon the president's pleasure. Amidst the swirling rumors on the potential replacement of the AFP chief regarding the seniority problem, the issues within the top brass was resolved on January 7, 2023, as General Andres Centino was reappointed as the AFP chief replacing Lieutenant General Bartolome Vicente Bacarro.

== Officeholders ==
No.	Portrait	Chief of Staff	Took office	Left office	Time in office	Service branch	Ref.
-	Jose de los Reyes	Brigadier General; Jose de los Reyes (1874–1945); Acting	January 11, 1936	May 4, 1936	114 days	Philippine Constabulary	
1	Paulino Santos	Major General; Paulino Santos (1890–1945)	May 4, 1936	December 31, 1938	2 years, 241 days	Philippine Constabulary	
2	Basilio Valdes	Major General; Basilio Valdes (1912–1970)	January 1, 1939	November 7, 1945	6 years, 310 days	Philippine Constabulary	
3	Rafael Jalandoni	Major General; Rafael Jalandoni (1894–?)	December 21, 1945	December 20, 1948	2 years, 365 days	Philippine Constabulary	
4	Mariano Castañeda	Major General; Mariano Castañeda (1905–1970)	December 21, 1948	May 28, 1951	2 years, 158 days	Philippine Constabulary	
5	Calixto Duque	Major General; Calixto Duque (1893–1972)	June 2, 1951	December 30, 1953	2 years, 211 days	Philippine Army	
6	Jesus Vargas	Lieutenant General; Jesus Vargas (1905–1994)	December 30, 1953	December 29, 1956	2 years, 365 days	Philippine Army	
7	Alfonso Arellano	Lieutenant General; Alfonso Arellano (1905–1957)	December 29, 1956	December 31, 1958	2 years, 2 days	Philippine Army	
8	Manuel Cabal	Lieutenant General; Manuel Cabal (1910–1987)	January 1, 1959	December 30, 1961	2 years, 363 days	Philippine Constabulary	
9	Pelagio Cruz	Lieutenant General; Pelagio Cruz (1912–1986)	December 31, 1961	August 31, 1962	243 days	Philippine Air Force	
10	Alfredo Santos	General; Alfredo Santos (1905–1990) (Note: First officer to hold full General rank.)	September 1, 1962	July 12, 1965	2 years, 314 days	Philippine Army	
11	Rigoberto Atienza	General; Rigoberto Atienza (1911–1966)	July 13, 1965	January 22, 1966	193 days	Philippine Army	
12	Ernesto Mata	General; Ernesto Mata (1915–2012) (Note: Recalled by President Marcos from retirement and appointed as Chief of Staff.)	January 22, 1966	January 21, 1967	364 days	Philippine Army	
13	Victor Osias	General; Victor Osias	January 21, 1967	August 15, 1967	206 days	Philippine Air Force	
14	Segundo Velasco	General; Segundo Velasco (born 1918)	August 16, 1967	May 27, 1968	285 days	Philippine Army	
15	Manuel T. Yan	General; Manuel T. Yan (1920–2008) (Note: Yan served as the youngest chief of Staff of the Armed Forces of the Philippines at the age of 48. Prior to that, he was the chief of the Philippine Constabulary. He currently holds the record for longest continuous government service from 1937– 2001 or 64 years of service.)	May 28, 1968	January 15, 1972	3 years, 232 days	Philippine Constabulary	
16	Romeo Espino	General; Romeo Espino (1914–2003) (Note: Espino served as the Commanding General of the Philippine Army before appointed to become the top military man. Espino is the longest-serving Chief of Staff of the Armed Forces of the Philippines for nine years, especially during the martial law regime. A second product of the ROTC. During his term, he was fair in administering the military, unlike his successor, General Fabian Ver.)	January 15, 1972	August 15, 1981	9 years, 212 days	Philippine Army	
17	Fabian Ver	General; Fabian Ver (1920–1998) (Note: Ver was considered a loyalist and the second most powerful man in the country next to President Ferdinand Marcos in the later years of his authoritarian regime, replacing then Defense Minister Juan Ponce Enrile, who held the status since 1972 when Marcos named him as martial law administrator upon the imposition of martial law. Ver, in fact, was the most powerful military officer at that time for, aside from being the top military man, he was also the commander of the Presidential Security Command and the director-general of NISA, the Marcos regime's secret police. The third military officer appointed as chief of staff that came from ROTC. During his term, he was known for his favoritism especially in the promotion of officers & was linked to the assassination of Senator Benigno Aquino Jr., the biggest critique of the Marcos regime.)	August 15, 1981	October 24, 1984	3 years, 70 days 85 days	Philippine Constabulary	
-	Fidel Ramos	Lieutenant General; Fidel Ramos (1928–2022); Acting (Note: Ramos served in acting capacity while General Ver was temporary relieved due to ongoing investigation of Aquino's assassination.)	October 24, 1984	December 2, 1985	1 year, 39 days	Philippine Constabulary	
(17)	Fabian Ver	General; Fabian Ver (1920–1998) (Note: Ver was considered a loyalist and the second most powerful man in the country next to President Ferdinand Marcos in the later years of his authoritarian regime, replacing then Defense Minister Juan Ponce Enrile, who held the status since 1972 when Marcos named him as martial law administrator upon the imposition of martial law. Ver, in fact, was the most powerful military officer at that time for, aside from being the top military man, he was also the commander of the Presidential Security Command and the director-general of NISA, the Marcos regime's secret police. The third military officer appointed as chief of staff that came from ROTC. During his term, he was known for his favoritism especially in the promotion of officers & was linked to the assassination of Senator Benigno Aquino Jr., the biggest critique of the Marcos regime.)	December 2, 1985	February 25, 1986	85 days	Philippine Constabulary	
18	Fidel Ramos	General; Fidel Ramos (1928–2022) (Note: Ramos then, before becoming the chief of the now defunct Philippine Constabulary in 1972, he was the commander of Philippine Army's 3rd Division in Cebu. On the 1980s he was promoted into vice-chief of staff with the rank of lieutenant general but remained as PC chief. After the EDSA revolt that ousted Marcos his cousin from power, he became the AFP chief. Later after retiring as AFP chief of staff during the term of President Corazon C. Aquino, he served as Secretary of National Defense and was elected the 12th President of the Republic of the Philippines in 1992 and served until 1998, the year which the country celebrated its centennial anniversary of the declaration of Independence, earning him the nickname of "Centennial President". He is the 2nd Army General who became the President of the Republic after Gen. Aguinaldo but he was the first & only career military officer to hold a rank of five-star general/admiral de jure rising from second lieutenant up to commander-in-chief of the armed forces.)	February 25, 1986	January 25, 1988	1 year, 334 days	Philippine Constabulary	
19	Renato de Villa	General; Renato de Villa (1935–2006) (Note: Prior to becoming chief of staff, in 1986, de Villa was named to be the chief of the Philippine Constabulary (now defunct), then an AFP major service acting as the country's police force while he was also named to be AFP vice-chief of staff with the rank of three-star general. Upon retirement, de Villa served as Secretary of National Defense when he retired in 1991 and ran for president but lost to Joseph Estrada and Executive Secretary under President Gloria Macapagal Arroyo.)	January 25, 1988	January 23, 1991	2 years, 363 days	Philippine Constabulary	
20	Rodolfo Biazon	General; Rodolfo Biazon (1935–2023) (Note: Biazon served in the Philippine Senate and the House of Representatives after his retirement as AFP chief of staff in 1991. He is the first and only Chief of Staff from the PMC. Prior to that, he served as the commander of the AFP NCR Defense Command in 1988 and Commandant of the Philippine Marine Corps in 1987. He had also served as the superintendent of the Philippine Military Academy in 1986.)	January 24, 1991	April 12, 1991	78 days	Philippine Marine Corps	
21	Lisandro Abadia	General; Lisandro Abadia (1938–2022)	April 12, 1991	April 12, 1994	3 years, 0 days	Philippine Army	
22	Arturo Enrile	General; Arturo Enrile (1940–1998) (Note: Enrile later served as Secretary of the DOTC under President Fidel Ramos.)	April 12, 1994	November 28, 1996	2 years, 230 days	Philippine Army	
23	Arnulfo Acedera Jr.	General; Arnulfo Acedera Jr. (1941–2020)	November 28, 1996	December 31, 1997	1 year, 33 days	Philippine Air Force	
24	Clemente Mariano	General; Clemente Mariano	January 1, 1998	July 1, 1998	181 days	Philippine Army	
25	Joselin Nazareno	General; Joselin Nazareno (Note: Later served as Ambassador to Pakistan.)	July 1, 1998	July 8, 1999	1 year, 7 days	Philippine Army	
26	Angelo Reyes	General; Angelo Reyes (1945–2011) (Note: Reyes later served as Secretary of National Defense, Secretary of DILG, Secretary of DENR, and Secretary of DOE under President Gloria Macapagal Arroyo.)	July 8, 1999	March 17, 2001	1 year, 252 days	Philippine Army	
27	Diomedio Villanueva	General; Diomedio Villanueva (1945–2023)	March 17, 2001	May 18, 2002	1 year, 62 days	Philippine Army	
28	Roy Cimatu	General; Roy Cimatu (born 1946) (Note: Cimatu later served as Special Envoy to the Middle East. Cimatu served as the Secretary of the DENR under President Rodrigo Duterte.)	May 18, 2002	September 10, 2002	115 days	Philippine Army	
29	Benjamin Defensor Jr.	General; Benjamin Defensor Jr.	September 10, 2002	November 28, 2002	79 days	Philippine Air Force	
30	Dionisio Santiago	General; Dionisio Santiago (Note: Later served as the director-general of the Philippine Drug Enforcement Agency.)	November 28, 2002	April 8, 2003	131 days	Philippine Army	
31	Narciso Abaya	General; Narciso Abaya (born 1950)	April 8, 2003	October 29, 2004	1 year, 204 days	Philippine Army	
32	Efren Abu	General; Efren Abu	October 29, 2004	August 15, 2005	290 days	Philippine Army	
33	Generoso Senga	General; Generoso Senga (born 1950)	August 15, 2005	July 22, 2006	341 days	Philippine Army	
34	Hermogenes Esperon Jr.	General; Hermogenes Esperon Jr. (born 1952) (Note: Esperon later served as Presidential Adviser on Peace Process under President Gloria Macapagal Arroyo & later served as National Security Adviser under President Rodrigo Duterte.)	July 22, 2006	May 12, 2008	1 year, 295 days	Philippine Army	
35	Alexander Yano	General; Alexander Yano (Note: Yano later served as our country's Ambassador to Brunei.)	May 12, 2008	May 1, 2009	354 days	Philippine Army	
36	Victor Ibrado	General; Victor Ibrado	May 1, 2009	March 10, 2010	313 days	Philippine Army	
37	Delfin Bangit	General; Delfin Bangit (1955–2013)	March 10, 2010	June 22, 2010	104 days	Philippine Army	
–	Nestor Ochoa	Lieutenant General; Nestor Ochoa; Acting	June 22, 2010	June 30, 2010	8 days	Philippine Army	
38	Ricardo David	General; Ricardo David (born 1955) (Note: David later served as Bureau of Immigration Commissioner under President Benigno Aquino III.)	July 2, 2010	March 7, 2011	248 days	Philippine Army	
39	Eduardo Oban Jr.	General; Eduardo Oban Jr. (born 1955)	March 7, 2011	December 12, 2011	280 days	Philippine Air Force	
40	Jessie Dellosa	General; Jessie Dellosa (born 1957)	December 12, 2011	January 20, 2013	1 year, 39 days	Philippine Army	
41	Emmanuel Bautista	General; Emmanuel Bautista (born 1958)	January 20, 2013	July 18, 2014	1 year, 179 days	Philippine Army	
42	Gregorio Pio Catapang	General; Gregorio Pio Catapang (born 1959) (Note: Later served as Bases Conversion Development Agency Board Member and as Officer-In-Charge Director-general of the Bureau of Corrections under President Bongbong Marcos.)	July 18, 2014	July 10, 2015	357 days	Philippine Army	
43	Hernando Iriberri	General; Hernando Iriberri (born 1960)	July 10, 2015	April 22, 2016	287 days	Philippine Army	
–	Glorioso Miranda	Lieutenant General; Glorioso Miranda (born 1961); Acting	April 22, 2016	June 30, 2016	69 days	Philippine Army	
44	Ricardo Visaya	General; Ricardo Visaya (born 1960) (Note: Later served as the Administrator of the National Irrigation Administration (NIA) under President Rodrigo Duterte.)	July 1, 2016	December 7, 2016	159 days	Philippine Army	
45	Eduardo Año	General; Eduardo Año (born 1961) (Note: Later served as the Secretary of the Department of the Interior and Local Government (DILG) under President Rodrigo Duterte.)	December 7, 2016	October 26, 2017	323 days	Philippine Army	
46	Rey Leonardo Guerrero	General; Rey Leonardo Guerrero (born 1961) (Note: Later served as the Administrator of the Maritime Industry Authority (MARINA) and later as Commissioner of the Bureau of Customs under President Rodrigo Duterte)	October 26, 2017	April 18, 2018	174 days	Philippine Army	
47	Carlito Galvez Jr.	General; Carlito Galvez Jr. (born 1962) (Note: Later served as the Presidential Adviser on the Peace Process & later as the Vaccine Czar during the COVID-19 pandemic in the Philippines)	April 18, 2018	December 11, 2018	237 days	Philippine Army	
48	Benjamin Madrigal Jr.	General; Benjamin Madrigal Jr. (born 1963) (Note: Madrigal later served as a member of the governing board of the Philippine Coconut Authority.)	December 11, 2018	September 24, 2019	287 days	Philippine Army	
49	Noel Clement	General; Noel Clement (born 1964)	September 24, 2019	January 4, 2020	102 days	Philippine Army	
50	Felimon Santos Jr.	General; Felimon Santos Jr. (born 1964)	January 4, 2020	August 3, 2020	212 days	Philippine Army	
51	Gilbert Gapay	General; Gilbert Gapay (1965–2026)	August 3, 2020	February 4, 2021	185 days	Philippine Army	
52	Cirilito Sobejana	General; Cirilito Sobejana (born 1965)	February 4, 2021	July 31, 2021	177 days	Philippine Army	
53	Jose Faustino Jr.	General; Jose Faustino Jr. (born 1965) (Note: later served as the Officer-In-Charge Secretary of the Department of National Defense under President Bongbong Marcos)	July 31, 2021	November 12, 2021	104 days	Philippine Army	
54	Andres Centino	General; Andres Centino (born 1967)	November 12, 2021	August 8, 2022	269 days	Philippine Army	
55	Bartolome Vicente Bacarro	Lieutenant General; Bartolome Vicente Bacarro (born 1966)	August 8, 2022	January 6, 2023	151 days	Philippine Army	
56	Andres Centino	General; Andres Centino (born 1967)	January 6, 2023	July 21, 2023	196 days	Philippine Army	
57	Romeo Brawner Jr.	General; Romeo Brawner Jr. (born 1968)	July 21, 2023	July 21, 2026	3 years, 0 days	Philippine Army	
58	Antonio Nafarrete	General; Antonio Nafarrete (born 1969)	July 21, 2026		105 days	Philippine Army	

== See also ==
- Chairman of the Joint Chiefs of Staff (Jordan)
- Chairman Joint Chiefs of Staff Committee (Pakistan)
- Chairman of the Joint Chiefs of Staff (United States)
