= Pelagio Cruz =

Former Filipino general

Pelagio A. Cruz
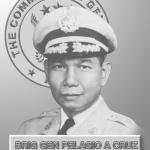
- Pelagio Cruz as Chief of Staff

Chief of Staff of the Armed Forces of the Philippines
- In office December 31, 1961 – August 1962
- President: Diosdado Macapagal
- Preceded by: Manuel Cabal
- Succeeded by: Alfredo M. Santos

Vice-Chief of Staff of the Armed Forces of the Philippines
- In office January 1, 1959 – December 28, 1961
- President: Diosdado Macapagal; Carlos P. Garcia
- Preceded by: Manuel Cabal

Deputy Chief of Staff of the Armed Forces of the Philippines
- In office December 30, 1958 – January 1, 1959
- President: Carlos P. Garcia
- Succeeded by: Alfredo Santos

Chief of Philippine Constabulary
- In office June 2, 1958 – December 30, 1958
- President: Carlos P. Garcia
- Preceded by: Manuel Cabal
- Succeeded by: Isagani Villoria Campo

Director of National Intelligence Security Authority
- In office 1956 – June 2, 1958

Commanding General of the Philippine Air Force
- In office November 3, 1953 – December 17, 1956
- President: Elpidio Quirino; Ramon Magsaysay
- Preceded by: Benito R. Ebuen
- Succeeded by: Benito R. Ebuen
- In office June 9, 1947 – March 16, 1951
- President: Manuel Roxas; Elpidio Quirino
- Preceded by: Edwin Andrews
- Succeeded by: Eustacio D. Orobia

Personal details
- Born: Pelagio Almazar Cruz; June 16, 1912 Baliuag, Bulacan, Philippine Islands
- Died: October 21, 1986 (aged 74) Quezon City, Philippines
- Education: Philippine Constabulary Academy
- Profession: Constable; Pilot; Soldier
- Awards: Silver Star; Gold Cross; Distinguished Unit Badge w/Two Oakleaf Clusters; Philippine Defense Medal with Two Bronze Victory Ribbon; Philippine Liberation Ribbon; Distinguished Service Star

Military service
- Allegiance: Philippines
- Branch/service: Philippine Air Force; Philippine Army; Philippine Constabulary
- Years of service: 1932–1962
- Rank: Lieutenant General
- Unit: Provisional PAAC Regiment
- Commands: Armed Forces of the Philippines; Philippine Constabulary; Philippine Air Force; Philippine Army; Philippine Army Air Corps
- Battles/wars: Battle of Bataan; Liberation of the Philippines

Pelagio Almazar Cruz (June 16, 1912 – October 21, 1986) was the first Armed Forces of the Philippines Chief-of-Staff from the Philippine Air Force. He was the Commanding General of the Philippine Air Force in two occasions from its transition from Philippine Army Air Corps in 1947 to 1951 and again in 1953 to 1956. He is considered as the father of Philippine Air Force.

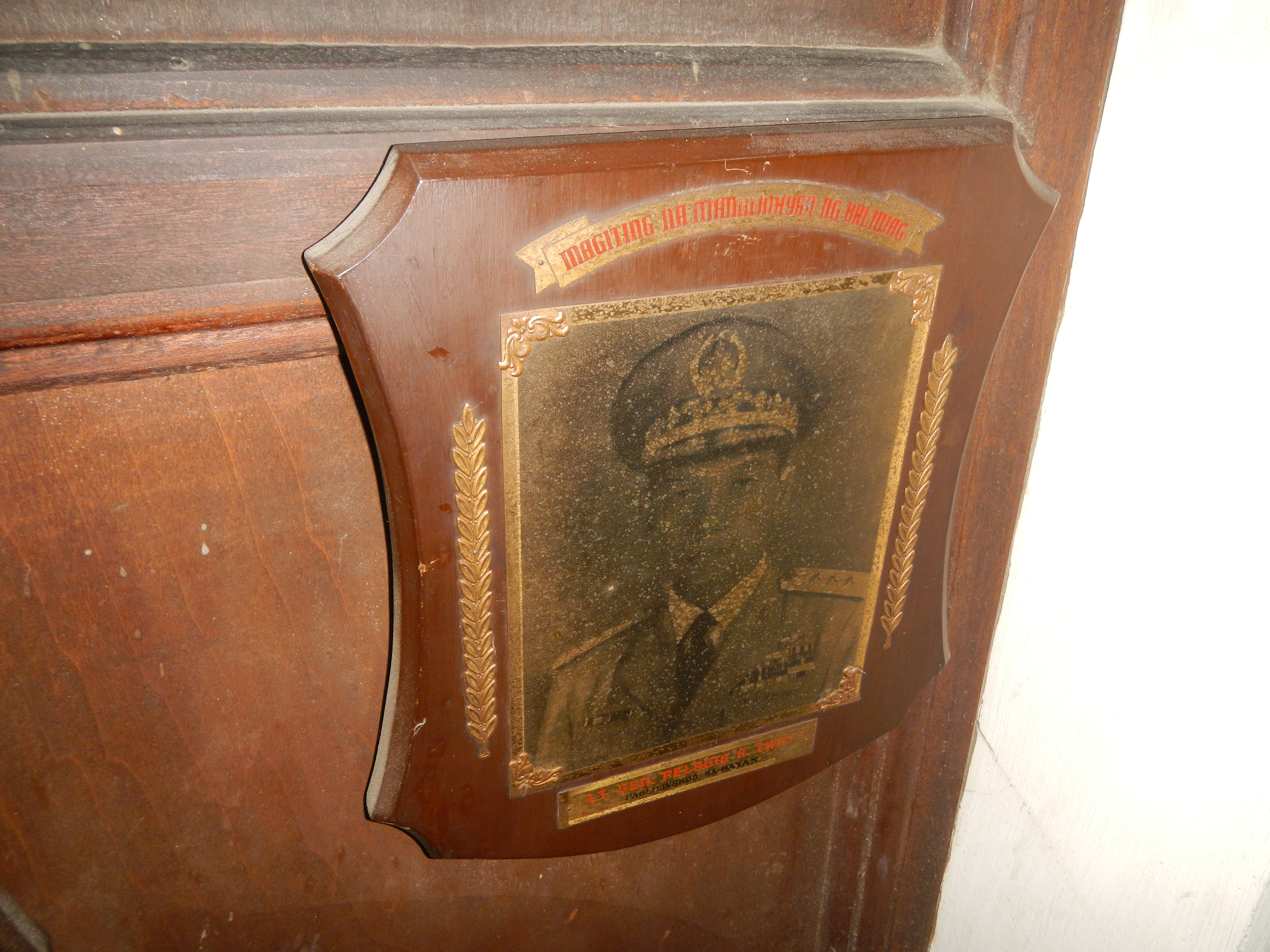
Pelagio Cruz

== Later years ==
=== Military retirement ===
He retired from the active military service on 1 September 1962.

=== Death ===
He died on October 21, 1986, at Quezon City, Philippines at the age of 74.

== See also ==
- Philippine Air Force
