= Alfredo Santos =

Filipino general (1905–1990)

- GEN Alfredo M. Santos AFP

Chief of Staff of the Armed Forces of the Philippines
- In office September 1, 1962 – July 12, 1965
- President: Diosdado Macapagal
- Preceded by: Pelagio A. Cruz
- Succeeded by: Rigoberto Atienza

Commanding General, Philippine Army
- In office August 1, 1960 – September 16, 1962
- Preceded by: Tirso Fajardo
- Succeeded by: Dominador Garcia

Chief of War Plans Division G5
- In office 1957–1959

Personal details
- Born: Alfredo Manapat Santos; July 13, 1905 Santa Cruz, Manila, Philippine Islands
- Died: February 7, 1990 (aged 84) Manila, Philippines
- Nickname(s): Hammer, Hero of the Pockets, First Four-star General

Military service
- Allegiance: Republic of the Philippines
- Branch/service: Philippine Army
- Years of service: 1929–1965
- Rank: General
- Commands: Armed Forces of the Philippines Philippine Army; Panay Task Force 1st Infantry Regiment
- Battles/wars: World War II; Battle of Bataan; Battle of Luzon; Battle of Manila (1945)

Alfredo Manapat Santos (July 13, 1905 – February 7, 1990) was Chief of Staff of the Armed Forces of the Philippines in 1962 to 1965, making him the first four-star general of the Philippines' armed forces.

== Early life ==
Santos was born in Santa Cruz, Manila, Philippines, on July 13, 1905, to Fructoso L. Santos and Agatona J. Manapat, and was seventh among fourteen children. His secondary education was acquired in Manila North High school (now Arellano). He graduated at Mapúa Institute of Technology with a degree in Bachelor of Science in civil engineering in 1931. In the same year, he passed the board examination. He showed interest in the military when he graduated on the top of his ROTC class at the University of the Philippines as a cadet colonel and corps commander in 1929. He continued this interest after schooling.

== Military career ==
=== The hero of the pockets ===
General Santos' military career started when he was appointed probationary third lieutenant on June 8, 1936, after five years of civil engineering practice. He entered the Reserve Officer Service School (ROSS) at Camp Henry T. Allen in Baguio City, where he was made the battalion commander. He graduated at the top of his class, and twenty years after, he was honored as its Most Distinguished Alumnus.

Then Captain Santos was the most decorated unit commander of the 1st Regular Division during the Bataan campaign, even dubbed by commanding general, Brigadier General Fidel V. Segundo, as the "Hammer of the Division" when he brilliantly outmaneuvered and outsmarted the enemy during their attempt to pocket their area. In both attempts, his unit successfully broke through the Gogo-Cotar and Tuol Pockets, thus earning for himself the moniker "hero of the pockets".

For his heroic feat in battle, he was promoted to major in the field. Two days after, he was decorated with the United States Army's Distinguished Service Cross for "extraordinary heroism in combat in Bataan" and the Silver Star for "gallantry in action". Later, the Philippine Government awarded him the equivalent Distinguished Conduct Star and Gold Cross for the same combat action.

=== During World War II ===
On January 25, 1942, a superior Japanese Army force launched an attack southward from a general line along Pilar-Bagac Road. The attack swept the outpost line in resistance, and penetrated the Main Line of Resistance (MLR) of the 1st Regular Division on the Gogo-Cotar River area, Bataan, creating a 500-yard gap through which the enemy rushed. For four days, hundreds of Japanese troops tried to break through lines.

Santos was given the hazardous mission of closing the gaps and annihilating the enemy troops who had infiltrated the lines as the gap posed a serious threat to the positions and the security of the division. He led a counter-attack against the strong and numerically superior Japanese forces positioned between the MLR and the Regimental Reserve Line (RRL). The fighting began at dawn of January 29, 1942. With dogged determination, the defenders fought assiduously and without pause against all odds to restore the defensive sector assigned to the 1st Regular Division.

Major Santos was ordered to surrender his unit to the Imperial Japanese Forces, which he reluctantly did on April 12, 1942. He became a prisoner of war and was one of the captives in the "Death March" to Camp O'Donnell at Capas, Tarlac. He was released from the concentration camp on August 10, 1942.

During the Japanese occupation from December 1942 to January 1945, he joined the Filipino-American Irregular Troops (FAIT) under Col. Hugh I. Straughn as chief of the Intelligence Division of the North Section in Manila, with the rank of colonel. He fought with the American and Filipino soldiers in the liberation of Manila from February to March 1945.

He returned to military control at the end of the liberation campaign that year and was assigned at Camp Murphy as camp inspector of the 2nd Camp Complement. Later, he held other positions, including executive officer and S-3 of the 1st Camp Complement; acting district commander at Camp Olivas, San Fernando, Pampanga; commanding officer of the 4th MP Battalion, Mandaluyong, Rizal, in April 1946; and executive officer of the Presidential Guard Battalion in Malacañan Palace, Manila.

=== Military career after the war ===
In July 1946, he was sent to the United States as a student officer at the Command and General Staff College at Fort Leavenworth, Kansas, US, where he finished the regular Command and Staff course a year later on July 3, 1947.

When Congressman Datu Mangelen and Senator Salipada Pendatun offered him the provincial governorship of Cotabato in 1951, through then Secretary of National Defense Ramon Magsaysay, he declined. It was a personal decision which was very difficult to make. At that time, the position was appointive, rather than elective.

The province of Cotabato then was in turmoil. Violent clashes occurred, resulting in the death of many political followers of contending parties. But he contended that the problem was essentially political in nature, and that he had charted his course for a military career. His negative reply was honored. Santos knew what he wanted in his career and to him a diversion like that of the appointive offer would adversely affect his plan to attain the highest position in the military hierarchy.

=== Santos and the Huk ===
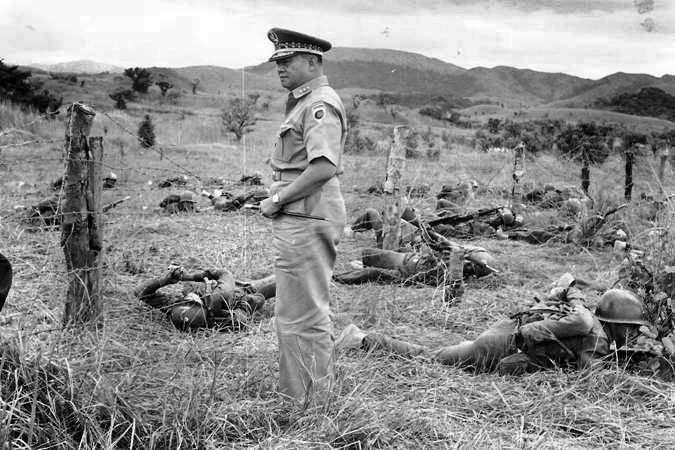
General Santos with his soldiers

Subsequently, Colonel Santos was given command of the Panay Task Force, composed of the 15th Battalion Combat Team (BCT) with some elements of the 9th BCT and the PC commands of Iloilo, Capiz and Antique. Reporting to his new command on March 1, 1951, he once more showed his incontestable ability and grit in military tactics. As proof of this, he earned the distinction of having accounted for the fall of two of the highest-ranking dissidents at the height of the Huk campaign.

This position gave him the opportunity to put his military prowess in full play. He made history when Guillermo Capadocia, erstwhile secretary general and one of the founders of the Communist Party of the Philippines (CPP), was captured at Barrio Yubog in San Remigio, Antique. During the hectic campaign to capture Capadocia and destroy the leftist band in 1951 and 1952 on Panay Island, Colonel Santos made one crucial decision which ensured the success of the operations. He organized a civilian commando unit headed by Pedro Valentin, a mountain leader who knew the people and the terrain very well.

Part of his command decision was the designation of the civilian commando unit as the attacking force, while elements of the 15th BCT served as the holding or covering forces. Had it been otherwise, the wily Capadocia would have had the government forces running around at circles as they were handicapped in the rough terrain. Capadocia's death was the consummation of Santos' bold plan.

The incessant military operations aimed primarily at the capture, whether dead or alive, of dissident leaders resulted in the surrender of hundreds of their men. In addition, the capture of the rebels' arms, supplies and equipment as well as important documents which were of great value to the entire campaign for peace and order throughout the country was crucial in breaking up the backbone of the dissidents' depredations in Visayas and Mindanao.

=== A crucial campaign, a smart decision and sweet victory ===
In the crucial campaign to capture Huk leader Mariano P. Balgos and destroy his group in the Bicol region, Colonel Santos made a decision to pull out all army troops from the provinces of Sorsogon, Camarines Norte and Camarines Sur after an on-the-spot study and estimate of the situation in the field. Operations then concentrated in the Manito area where the Huk leader was reportedly holed up. It was a risky decision, as it left those other area at the mercy of Balgos and his marauders, headed by the murderous Commander "Tagle". But the weather proved to be an unexpected ally in Colonel Santos' operation.

A strong typhoon that was raging at the time, and the possibility that Balgos could have slipped out due to the thinness of the cordon surrounding him was very evident. Balgos loved sardines. The sardine manufacturer cooperated in putting botulism in the sardines distributed in the stores surrounding his hideout. Under cover of the typhoon, a scout ranger team (Rafael Ileto's) positioned itself at the latrine area of his camp and caught him in their sights literally with his pants down. Refusing to surrender, he jumped with both pistols drawn. His death compensated for the great risk taken. It virtually broke the expansion phase of the HMB and CPP in the Bicol region.

Colonel Santos' deep understanding and full knowledge of the nature of the dissident underground movement enabled him to effect the intelligent deployment of his troops as well as secure the cooperation and support of the civilian population and weakening the Huk organization. Six days after his second achievement, Colonel Santos was appointed ad interim brigadier general by President Ramon Magsaysay, a well-deserved appointment which was confirmed by the Commission of Appointments on May 4, 1955.

His successful effort in the Huk campaigns spread abroad and inspired other military leaders in Southeast Asia who were locked in similar fierce battle aimed at stopping the spread of Communism in their own similar countries. As a result, he was awarded Philippine Legion of Honor (Degree of Commander) and later another Legion of Honor (Degree of Officer) from the United States Government.

=== Position in the SEATO ===
In 1956, he was assigned back at Camp Murphy as chief of the War Plans Division. Santos later was nominated and subsequently installed as the first chief of SEATO Military Planning Office with headquarters in Bangkok, Thailand on March 1, 1957.

=== Army Career Management Program ===
General Santos with President Diosdado Macapagal

On August 1, 1960, he was designated commanding general of the Philippine Army.

After having served for more than two years as commanding general of the Philippine Army, he was appointed by President Diosdado Macapagal as chief of staff of the AFP on September 1, 1962, thus becoming the first military man from the ranks of the ROTC and "citizen army" to be named to the highest military post. With his ascendance to this top position, he also set precedent of being the first one-star general to be elevated directly to a three-star rank, that of lieutenant general.

=== Election to the Allied Officers Hall of Fame ===
The latest honor bestowed upon General Santos was his election into the Allied Officers Hall of Fame at the United States Army Command and General Staff at Fort Leavenworth, Kansas, US. He received the Certificate of Honor from US Ambassador Henry A. Byroade in simple ceremonies held at the US Embassy, Roxas Boulevard, Manila, on April 14, 1973.

== Awards and decorations ==
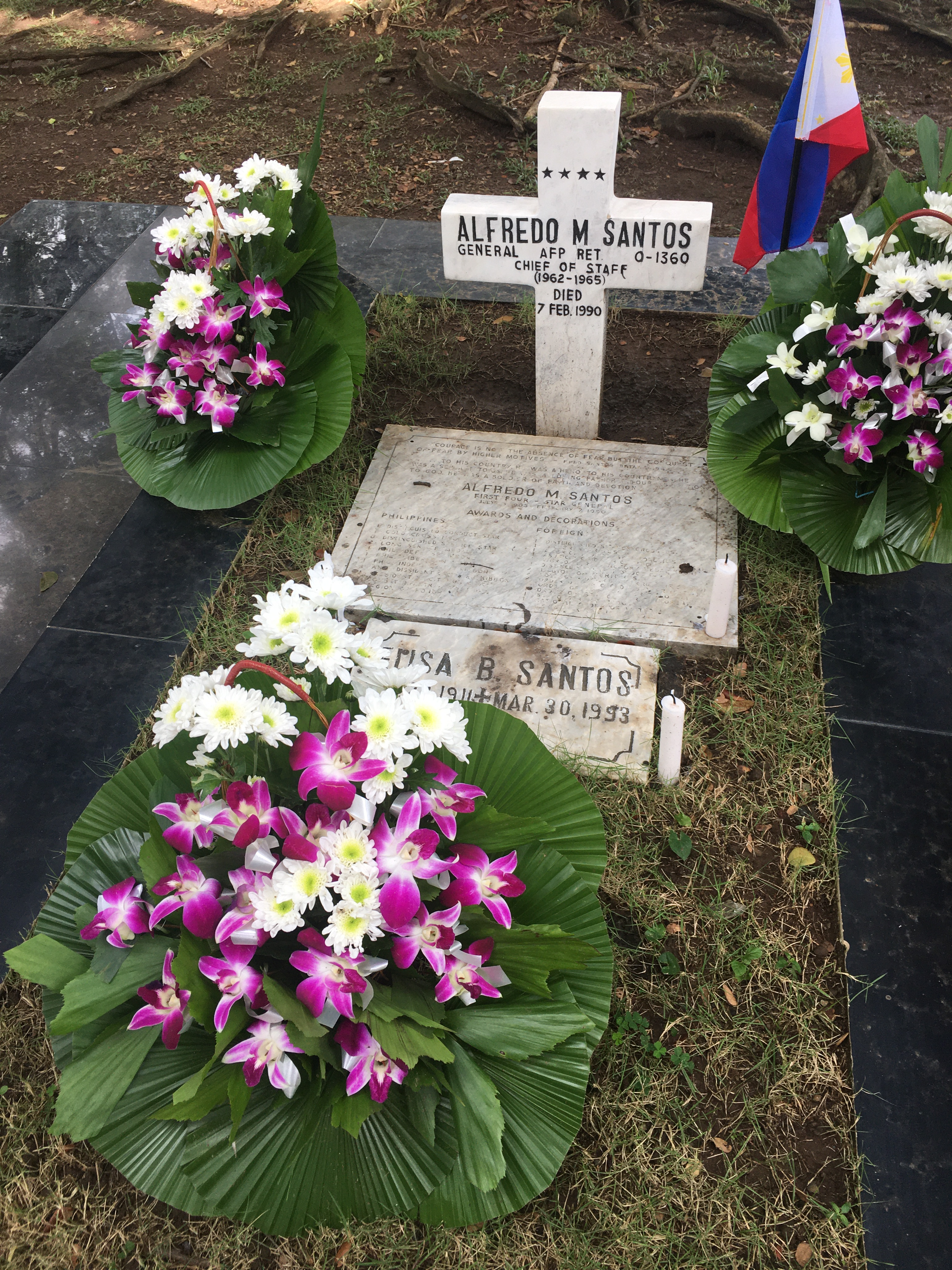
General Santos is interred at the Libingan ng mga Bayani with his wife, Elisa B. Santos.

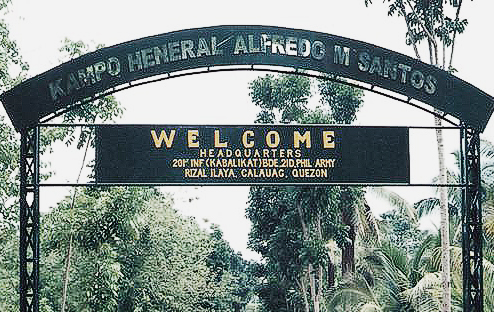
Camp Gen. Alfredo M. Santos in Calauag, Quezon

=== National honours ===
- Legion of Honor, Class Unknown
- Distinguished Conduct Star
- Distinguished Service Star (7)
- Gold Cross Medal
- Long Service Medal (2)
- Philippine Defense Medal
- Anti-Dissidence Campaign Medal
- Philippine Independence Medal
- Philippine Liberation Medal

=== Foreign honour ===
- USA :
  - Army Distinguished Service Cross
  - Silver Star Medal
  - Officer of the Legion of Merit
  - Asia-Pacific Theater Campaign Medal
  - American Defense Medal
  - World War II Victory Medal
- South Vietnam :
  - National Order of Vietnam, Class Unknown
  - Kim Khanh Decoration, First Class
- Thailand :
  - Knight Grand Cordon of the Order of the Crown of Thailand
- South Korea :
  - Order of Military Merit, Eulji Medal
- Taiwan :
  - Order of the Cloud and Banner (2)

=== Unit Citation ===
- Presidential Unit Citation
- Presidential Unit Citation (Army)

=== Badge ===
- Combat Infantryman Badge
- SEATO Service Badge

== Milestones ==
1. Corps Commander, Manila North High School Cadet Corps 1924-1925
2. Corps Commander, University of the Philippines R.O.T.C. 1928-1929, and Honor Graduate, ROTC Advanced Course.
3. Honor Graduate and Topnotcher - First Reserve Officers Service School, Camp Henry T. Allen, Baguio 1936; Most Outstanding Graduate 1956
4. First Chief SEATO Military Planning Office, Bangkok, Thailand 1957-1958
5. First ROTC graduate to become commanding general of the Philippine Army 1960-1962
6. First ROTC graduate to become chief of staff of the Armed Forces of the Philippines (1962–1965)
7. First Filipino four-star general 1963
8. First Filipino General with the degree of Doctor of Laws (Honoris Causa) 1965
9. First Filipino General to address the Imperial Defense College (highest British military institution) in London, England, 1965
10. During the Bataan Campaign, he was dubbed "Hammer of the 1st Regular Division" when Gen. Santos brilliantly outmaneuvered the Japanese in their attempt to outflank and envelop the Division.
11. Also during the Bataan campaign, twice the Japanese Imperial Forces attempted to pocket the 1st Regular Division and twice Gen. Santos' unit broke through and destroyed these pockets (Gogo-Cotar and Tulo Pockets) thus earning himself the honor "Hero of the Pockets".
12. Participated in the infamous "Death March", and was concentrated in the Capas, Tarlac Prisoners of War Concentration Camp.
13. Gen. Santos has the distinct honor of having accounted for two original organizers of the Communist Party of the Philippines and Regional Huk Field Commanders in the capture and death of Guillermo Capadoica in 1951 and Mariano P. Balgos in 1954, both former Secretary General of the Communist Party and the capture of Dr. Jesus M. Lava in 1964, Head, Politburo and Chairman, Communist Party of the Philippines.
14. Selected by the Military Historical Division, AFP in December 1951 as one of the 22 Outstanding Soldier in Philippine History.
15. Inducted by US Army Command and General Staff College, Fort Leavenworth, in the Allied Officer Hall of Fame for Outstanding Military Achievements as Chief of Staff, AFP.

== See also ==
- University of the Philippines ROTC Unit
- Armed Forces of the Philippines
- Libingan ng mga Bayani
- Battle of Manila (1945)
- Battle of Luzon
- Labanan sa Maynila (1945)
- Labanan sa Luzon

Military offices
| Preceded by Pelagio Cruz | Chief of Staff of the Armed Forces of the Philippines; 1962 to 1965 | Succeeded by Rigoberto Atienza |
