= Alfonso Arellano =

Filipino army officer

Chief of Staff of the Armed Forces of the Philippines
- In office December 29, 1956 – July 1, 1957
- Appointed by: President Ramon Magsaysay
- President: Carlos P. Garcia; Ramon Magsaysay
- Deputy: Manuel Cabal
- Preceded by: Jesus Vargas
- Succeeded by: Manuel Cabal

Vice Chief of Staff, Armed Forces of the Philippines
- In office July 1, 1956 – December 29, 1956
- President: Ramon Magsaysay
- Preceded by: Eulogio Balao
- Succeeded by: Manuel Cabal

Commanding General, Philippine Army
- In office December 29, 1954 – July 1, 1956
- President: Ramon Magsaysay
- Preceded by: Jesus Vargas
- Succeeded by: Leoncio S. Tan

Personal details
- Born: Alfonso Viterbo Arellano; March 12, 1905 Talavera, Nueva Ecija, Philippine Islands
- Died: June 1, 1957 (aged 52)
- Spouse: Josephine Arzabal
- Parent: Silvino Viterbo Arellano Saturnina Viloria Viterbo
- Education: Philippine Constabulary Academy (1929)
- Occupation: Soldier
- Profession: Soldier
- Awards: Legion of Merit

Military service
- Allegiance: Philippines; United States of America
- Branch/service: Philippine Army; Philippine Constabulary
- Years of service: 1929 - 1957
- Rank: Lieutenant General
- Battles/wars: World War II; Hukbalahap Campaign

Alfonso Viterbo Arellano (March 12, 1905 – June 1, 1957) was a Filipino army officer who served as AFP Chief of Staff from 1956 to 1957. He was a World War II veteran and decorated soldier. He was appointed by President Ramon Magsaysay a fellow World War II hero.

== Early years and education ==
Arellano was born on March 12, 1905, in Talavera, Nueva Ecija to father Silvino Viterbo Arellano and mother Saturnina Viloria Viterbo. He was admitted to the Philippine Constabulary Academy in 1927 and graduated in 1929.

== World War II and after ==
Arellano, then Captain, commanded 41st Field Artillery Battalion under 41st Infantry Division of General Vicente Lim during battle of Bataan. He was a POW after Bataan force was surrendered by General King in April 1942 and was in the Bataan Death March. He was released within the year and subsequently a joined guerilla unit to harass Japanese forces until General MacArthur returned.

After the war he resumed his military career with Philippine Army and became its commanding general in 1954 and subsequently appointed as Armed Forces Vice Chief of Staff in 1956 Chief of Staff 1957. He worked in reorganizing, recruitment, and making the Armed Forces of the Philippines professional soldiers but died in July 1957 while still in office. The road in gate 6 of Fort Bonifacio was named after him for his honor.

== See also ==
- Chief of Staff of the Armed Forces of the Philippines
- Commanding General Philippine Army
- 41st Infantry Division (Philippines)
- PMA Top Graduates
- PMA Class in AFP Position

Military offices
Preceded by Jesus Vargas	Chief of Staff of the Armed Forces of the Philippines; 1956 to 1957	Succeeded by Manuel Cabal
Preceded by Jesus Vargas	Commanding General Philippine Army; 1956 to 1957	Succeeded by Leoncio S. Tan
