= Antonio Parlade Jr. =

Former Filipino general

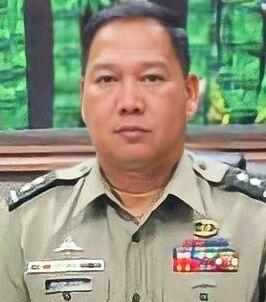
- Parlade Jr. in 2019

Spokesperson for the National Task Force to End Local Communist Armed Conflict
- In office 2018 – June 2021
- President: Rodrigo Duterte

Personal details
- Born: Antonio Gumba Parlade Jr. July 26, 1965 (age 61) Ligao, Albay, Philippines
- Party: Katipunan ng Demokratikong Pilipino
- Education: Philippine Military Academy; United States Army Command and General Staff College (M.M.A.S); Deakin University (M.A.S.S)
- Occupation: Soldier, politician
- Military career
- Allegiance: Philippines
- Branch: Philippine Army
- Service years: 1987–2021
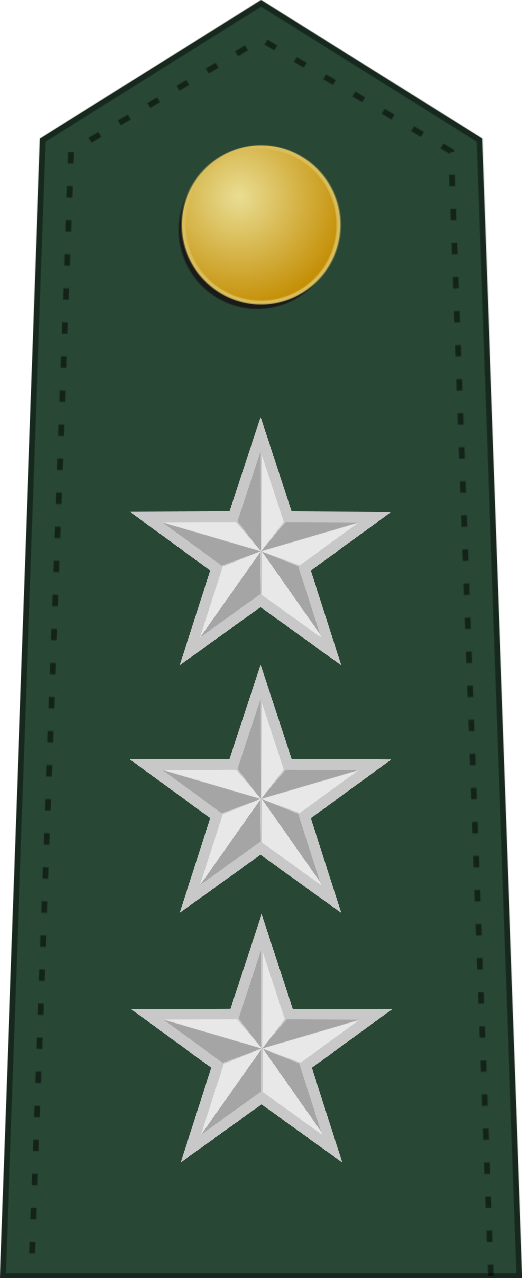
- Rank: Lieutenant general
- Units: AFP Southern Luzon Command; Deputy Chief of Staff for Civil-Military Operations, J7; 203rd Infantry Brigade, 2 ID; Chief of Public Affairs Office, Philippine Army
- Conflicts: Communist rebellion in the Philippines; Moro conflict

Antonio Gumba Parlade Jr. is a former Filipino military officer who retired as commander of the Armed Forces of the Philippines Southern Luzon Command in 2021, and was best known for his combative terms as spokesman for the Philippine Army before he was removed from that post in 2011, and later, as spokesperson of the National Task Force to End Local Communist Armed Conflict (NTF-ELCAC).

== Early life and education ==
Antonio Parlade Jr. was born on July 26, 1965, in Ligao, Albay but grew up in Daraga. His father Antonio Sr. was a farmer while her mother Manuela was a school teacher. He is the second eldest among four brothers. Under an agreement he was supposed to pursue priesthood while his elder brother was to enter the military. His brother failed to resolve issues on his dental health which was a prerequisite for him to get admitted to the Philippine Military Academy (PMA). Antonio Jr. entered the PMA in his brother's stead graduating, due to the experiences he witnessed in his hometown, as abuses from the CPP/New People's Army (NPA) were rampant, and the NPA once held the Bicol Region as one of its hotspots. These experiences prompted Parlade Jr.'s the Philippine Military Academy (PMA) in 1983.

Parlade was in the PMA during the waning days of the Marcos administration, and was still a cadet when the People Power Revolution resulted in the ouster and exile of Ferdinand Marcos and his family. Parlade Jr graduated from the academy as the Class Bawaw (Adjutant) of the "Hinirang" Class of 1987 - one of two batches of PMA cadets to graduate under the revolutionary government set up by Corazon Aquino before the promulgation of the 1987 Philippine constitution.

Parlade later also completed the Special Forces Operations Course, the Command and General Staff Course at the United States Army Command and General Staff College at Fort Leavenworth, Leavenworth County, Kansas, and the Executive Course on Defense Decision Making at Naval Postgraduate School, in Monterey, California. Parlade returned to Fort Leavenworth to hold his a Master's degree in Military Arts and Science, and also received his Master of Arts for Strategic Studies at the Deakin University in Melbourne, Australia.

== Military career ==
Through his career in the Armed Forces, Parlade became commander of various posts in the army, such as the Chief of Public Affairs Office and Spokesman for the Philippine Army, the Chief of Staff for Headquarters and Headquarters Support Group, and as Chief for Information Operations Division.

=== 6th Infantry Division and Reform the Armed Forces Movement ===
Upon first being accepted into the Armed Forces, Parlade Jr volunteered to be assigned to the 6th Infantry "Kampilan" Division of the Philippine Army (6ID PA) in Mindanao, which was active in counterinsurgency combat operations against the Moro National Liberation Front. After obtaining some combat experience, Parlade Jr received training AFP Special Forces Regiment (Philippines) and then returned to combat operations with the 6ID. During this time, Parlade was decorated with the Distinguished Conduct Star.

According to Parlade's account in his family's published memoirs, he experienced frustrations with corrupt superiors in the 6ID, which led him to join the Reform the Armed Forces Movement Young Officers Union, a faction of officers which had withdrawn its support from the administration of Corazon Aquino and called, among other things, for an "overhaul of the AFP and a hard line communist stand."

=== 1st Infantry Division ===
As a result of his involvement in RAM, Parlade was among a number of officers transferred from the 6ID to the 1st Infantry "Tabak" Division (1ID) based in Zamboanga, which Parlade says was engaged counterinsurgency combat operations against "CPP NPAs, or communist terrorists" at that time.

At the 1ID, he again noted corrupt practices by his battalion commander. This time, Parlade Jr. opted to go over the head of his commanding officer and report the infractions directly to their brigade division commander, the Chief of the Philippine Army, and the AFP Chief of Staff. The Battalion Commander was relieved, and Parlade was given an opportunity to train further at the US Infantry School in Fort Benning, Georgia.

=== Special Forces Regiment ===
Upon his return, Parlade Jr. was assigned to the Special Forces Regiment (Philippines), which focused on unconventional warfare and on "training, organizing, equipping, and controlling para-military forces." Within the PA Airborne, Parlade Jr.'s moved up the ladder from team leader, company commander, regimental staff, commandant of the Special Forces School, and battalion commander.

By the time Parlade Jr was promoted to Lt. Colonel, he was chosen to take his Master of Military Science at the US Army Command and General Staff course in Fort Leavenworth, Kansas. By 2006, he completed his Master of Military Science thesis, "An Analysis of the Communist Insurgency in the Philippines," which called for "the systematic eradication of the causes of unrest through good governance, sound economic policies, effective legislation, aggressive policing, and a little bit of calculated military presence to make the people feel secure."

=== Assignment and removal as PA Spokesman ===
Parlade Jr. was later promoted to a full Colonel, at which time he was assigned as Spokesman for the Philippine Army.

Parlade was sacked from that post in 2011 when he went on television to question the government's policy in the wake of the October 18, 2011, Al-Barka MILF-military encounter. The incident, which began when elements of the 13th Special Forces Company and 4th Special Forces Battalion were sent to Al Barka, Basilan to hunt down an MILF commander. Because the troops sent to Al Barka were mostly trainees, the resulting encounter saw the deaths of 6 MILF personnel and 19 government personnel, with the soldiers’ bodies found to have been mutilated by the time they were recovered by the military.

The Philippine government decided to pursue the mechanisms of the Bangsamoro peace process after the encounter, which the media called “one of the Army’s worst operational blunders in recent history.” But Parlade stated on television that the government should suspend the ceasefire it had with the MILF in Basilan at the time, and let the army pursue the MILF forces involved in the encounter.

Parlade was eventually assigned as commander of the 203rd Infantry Brigade of the 2nd Infantry Division.

=== AFP Deputy Chief of Staff for Civil-Military Operations ===
After his tour of duty as brigade commander, Parlade became the Assistant Deputy Chief of Staff for Operations, and following his position, Parlade was named as the Deputy Chief of Staff for Civil-Military Operations, J7, in March 2019, where he launched programs towards civic engagements, partnerships, and discussions with various stakeholders and partners of the AFP, from both the public and private sectors.

=== Southern Luzon Command ===
On 17 January 2020, Parlade took his post as the commander of the AFP Southern Luzon Command (SolCom), based in Camp Guillermo Nakar, Lucena City, where earned his third star and was promoted to Lieutenant general. As commander of SolCom, he launched intensified operations against the CPP/New People's Army (NPA) fronts in the SolCom's area of responsibility, and implemented measures in accordance with Executive Order No. 70, which also crafted a nation-building approach towards ending the communist insurgency. Parlade also subsequently serves as the spokesman of National Task Force to End Local Communist Armed Conflict (NTF-ELCAC), and continued his hard line approach against the CPP/NPA.

=== Retirement ===
Parlade retired from military service on July 25, 2021, and served a total of 38 years in the Philippine Army, and in the Armed Forces of the Philippines.

Among Parlade's military decorations include the Distinghished Conduct Star which was awarded to him in 1999, and he has twice been awarded Distinguished Service Star recipient, in 2007 and 2017.

== NTF-ELCAC spokesperson ==
As one of the key crafters and as the spokesperson of the National Task Force to End Local Communist Armed Conflict (NTF-ELCAC), Parlade has made public accusations that certain figures and institutions are linked to Communist rebels in the Philippines and consequentially has been criticized for "red-tagging" people and groups. He had also claimed in different instances that the Jabidah massacre in 1968 was a hoax spread by anti-government organizations despite the government acknowledging its reality in 2013.

=== "Red-tagging" incidents ===
In October 2018, Parlade was heavily criticized by De La Salle University, the University of Santo Tomas, and other higher education institutions when he identified 18 universities and colleges in Metro Manila as venues for recruitment for an alleged plot to oust President Rodrigo Duterte, called "Red October".

In October 2020, he accused of Manila Mayor Isko Moreno of "welcoming … terrorist[s]" to the city after the Moreno ordered the taking down of unauthorized tarpaulins that declared Communist Party of the Philippines (CPP) members, New People's Army (NPA) fighters and national democrats as personae non gratae in the city.

In the same month, he made similar allegations against a number of high-profile celebrities who criticized the government, including Angel Locsin, Liza Soberano, and Catriona Gray by associating their advocacy and rights activism work with the New People's Army. Soberano's camp denounced the "red tagging" of the actress. Gabriela Women’s Partylist Representative Arlene Brosas, senators Risa Hontiveros, and Francis Pangilinan defended Soberano and criticized Parlade's "red tagging", while the Concerned Artists of the Philippines (CAP) urged the general to retract his statement and apologize to the actress. Senator Panfilo "Ping" Lacson ordered the general summoned to senate hearing. Defense Secretary Delfin Lorenzana had also warned against making baseless accusations, indirectly referring to Parlade's statements and double-downs.

=== Investigation by the Philippine Senate ===
In February 2021, a Committee report from the Philippines' Senate Committee on National Defense criticized his behavior, saying it was bad for the government's anti-insurgency campaign. While the committee report concluded that a law criminalizing red-tagging was not needed, it said that Parlade's actions were "undue public propaganda" that were damaging to the National Task Force to End Local Communist Armed Conflict and the Armed Forces of the Philippine. Representatives France Castro, Carlos Zarate, Ferdinand Gaite, Eufemia Cullamat, Arlene Brosas, and Sarah Elago of the Makabayan bloc in the House of Representatives stated that "Current legal remedies are insufficient, defective and lacking. Human rights violators have largely escaped accountability. Experience has shown that even with the protective writs (habeas corpus, amparo, data), victims remain vulnerable to harassment and fail to deter attacks".

In that same month, the Armed Forces of the Philippines launched an investigation on Parlade's alleged "red-tagging" after he called journalist Tech Torres-Tupaz a "communist propagandist".

His role as a spokesperson was put into dispute, when Senator Lacson questioned the legality of Parlade's appointment believing it to be a violation of Article 16, Section 5 of the Constitution, barring active members of the military from holding civilian positions. National Security Adviser Hermogenes Esperon Jr. reasoned that the prohibition only applies to Career Executive Service (CES) positions defined under Executive Order 371 issued by President Corazon Aquino and the role of spokesperson is not considered a CES position. Parlade resigned from his position as spokesperson for the NTF-ELCAC sometime in June 2021, though he vowed to continue his campaign against communist revolutionaries.

Human Rights Watch said the Senate investigation of Parlade should lead to more efforts to hold accountable government officials whose red-tagging indirectly supports extrajudicial killings in the Philippines.

During a panel interview, he had once clarified that, "Communism per se … if it's just belief in communism and that belief isn't paired with violence, I think everyone would get along. … In fact, in Europe … there are still many communist parties, but that's okay since they don't maintain armed wings. Their societies have come to accept them. But over here, it's different: [the CPP] has an armed wing. And that's why we're having this problem." Likewise, in a later interview, he said that, "It's the same with the right: if you're far right, and you [cross the line] by taking up arms and trying to overthrow the [government], that's a whole other story."

=== Criminal and administrative complaints ===
Human rights group Karapatan filed before the Office of the Ombudsman criminal and administrative complaints against Parlade for allegedly violating the Philippine Act on Crimes Against International Humanitarian Law, Genocide, and Other Crimes Against Humanity. According to Karapatan, red-tagging by Parlade and other government officials fall under crimes against humanity of persecution. Parlade was also accused of violating the Anti-Graft and Corrupt Practices Act.

In September 2023, the Office of the Ombudsman found Parlade and former undersecretary Lorraine Badoy guilty of conduct prejudicial to the best interest of the service for red-tagging activists.

== Political career ==
=== 2022 disallowed presidential run ===
Parlade submitted his candidacy for president in the 2022 presidential elections under the Katipunan ng Demokratikong Pilipino party (KDP), but his substitution for independent candidate Antonio Valdez was disallowed by the Commission on Elections.

== Personal life ==
Parlade is married to Cecile Ortega since 1995 with whom he had four daughters and a son.
