= Guillermo Nakar =

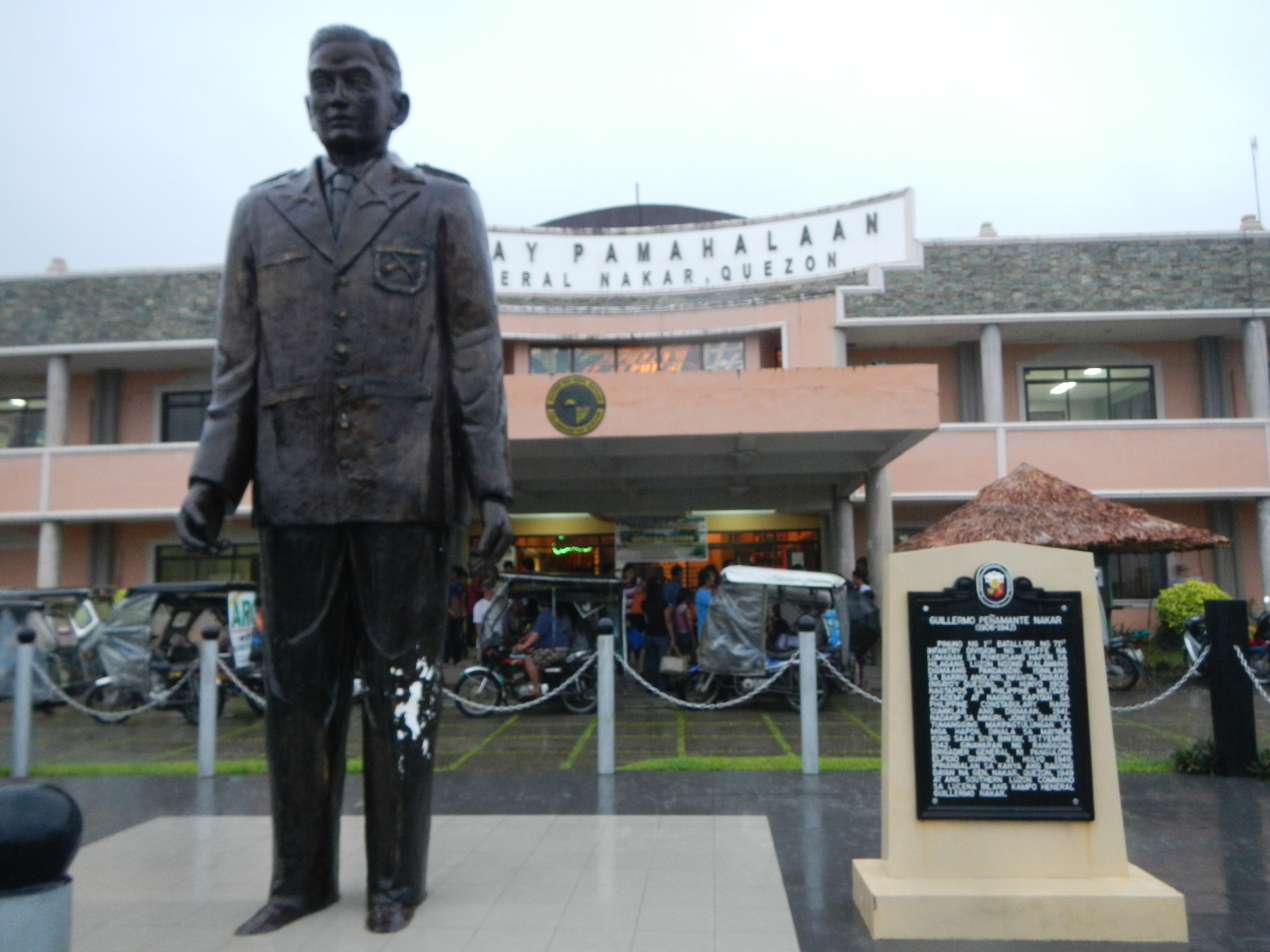
- Guillermo Peñamante Nakar Monument in General Nakar, Quezon
- Born: Guillermo Peñamante Nakar; June 10, 1906; Infanta, Tayabas, Philippine Islands
- Died: October 2, 1943 (aged 37); City of Greater Manila, Philippines
- Education: Philippine Constabulary Academy
- Military career
- Allegiance: Philippines; United States
- Branch: Philippine Army; Philippine Constabulary; USAFFE
- Service years: 1932–1943
- Rank: Lieutenant colonel
- Units: 14th Infantry 1st Guerilla Regiment 1st Battalion, 71st Infantry (Philippine Army)
- Conflicts: World War II
- Awards: Distinguished Conduct Star

Guillermo Peñamante Nakar (June 10, 1906 – October 2, 1943) was a Filipino soldier who became one of the first commanders of the guerrilla movement against the Japanese occupation of the Philippines before he was captured and executed by the Japanese in 1943.

== Early life and education ==
Nakar was born on June 10, 1906, in Infanta, Tayabas. He graduated from the Philippine Constabulary Academy, the forerunner of the Philippine Military Academy, in Baguio in 1932.

== Wartime service ==
When the Pacific War broke out in 1941, Nakar was then a captain in the 71st Infantry Regiment of the United States Army Forces in the Far East (USAFFE). Stationed in Bauang, La Union, he was unable to join the Allied forces' war plan to retreat to Bataan or Baguio due to the speedy arrival of Japanese forces in the area. Instead, he moved his unit to Aritao, Nueva Vizcaya after a 17-day journey and established an 800-person unit that participated in guerrilla warfare against the occupiers, with his unit being renamed the First Guerrilla Regiment and later the 14th Infantry Regiment. His theater of operations included Cagayan, Isabela, Nueva Vizcaya and Pangasinan, where his unit managed to launch a raid on Dagupan. On January 28, 1942, he relocated to Jones, Isabela before transferring again in May to the barrio of Domabato in Pinappagan (now Maddela, Quirino), by which time he had 1,065 personnel under his command.

Among his exploits was his attack on the Japanese garrison and airfield in Tuguegarao, Cagayan on January 13, 1942, while the Battle of Bataan was in its early stages, which led to 100 Japanese killed and three warplanes destroyed on the ground. On February 14, 1942, Nakar's forces briefly retook Bayombong, the provincial capital of Nueva Vizcaya, and executed the province's Japanese military administrator. After communications with the Philippines were lost following the Fall of Bataan in April and that of Corregidor in May, Nakar was able to transmit a radio message to General Douglas MacArthur's headquarters in Australia in June 1942 that confirmed the formation of an armed resistance movement in the country. Nakar was ultimately recognized by MacArthur as "the most prominent USAFFE officer in the northern Luzon area" and was promoted to lieutenant colonel. Nakar also published one of the first publications issued by the guerrilla movement, Matang Lawin (Hawk's Eye), which came out in mimeograph form from June to September 1942. On July 14, Nakar's unit was officially recognized by the US Army and renamed as the 14th Infantry.

== Capture and execution ==
Nakar was captured by the Japanese at his hideout in Sitio Minuri in Jones, Isabela, on September 29, 1942, after being betrayed. This followed threats by the Japanese to massacre the area's residents. He was taken to the main Japanese garrison in Manila at Fort Santiago and was tortured there for several months in an effort to convince him to change his allegiance to Japan. Surviving inmates testified that he continued to defy the Japanese before his execution on October 2, 1943 at the Manila North Cemetery.

Douglas MacArthur considered his capture as "the first serious blow to the coordinated command" of the guerrilla movement in Northern Luzon.

Other accounts place his execution among a group of American and Filipino guerrilla commanders taken from Bilibid Prison to the Chinese Cemetery in Manila in October 1943. Chris Schaefer, in Bataan Diary, places the executions on October 8, based principally on the postwar affidavits of cemetery caretaker Ignacio Santos and former Japanese-American interpreter Richard W. Sakakida, together with accounts of the prisoners' removal from Bilibid. Schaefer acknowledged that the eyewitness accounts were brief and contradictory and that the bodies were never recovered. U.S. Army investigators likewise could not establish the precise dates of death. The Army Graves Registration Service subsequently designated November 1, 1943, as the official date of death as recorded by American Battle Monument Commission (ABMC).

== Legacy ==
After the war, Nakar was posthumously awarded the Distinguished Conduct Star by the Philippine Army, with his widow receiving it on his behalf in 1946.

The headquarters of the Southern Luzon Command of the Armed Forces of the Philippines located in Lucena was renamed in his honor in 1978.

The municipality of General Nakar, Quezon was created and named in his honor in 1949. It includes Nakar's home village of Anoling and other villages carved out from its parent town of Infanta. The Alumni Hall of the Philippine Military Academy is also named after him.

== Personal life ==
Nakar was married to Angelina Coronel and had three children.
