= St. Vincent's College =

St. Vincent's College may refer to:

- St Vincent's College, Potts Point, New South Wales
- St. Vincent's College, Bridgeport, Connecticut - former college that merged with Sacred Heart University in 2017
- DePaul University, Chicago, Illinois; founded as St. Vincent's College in 1898, renamed in 1907

== See also ==
- Saint Vincent College, Latrobe, Pennsylvania
- Saint Vincent's College, Zamboanga del Norte, Philippines
- St Vincent College, Gosport, Hampshire, England
- St Vincent's College Ashfield, New South Wales
- Loyola Marymount University, Los Angeles, California, founded as St. Vincent's College
