= Bartolome Vicente Bacarro =

Chief of Staff of the Armed Forces of the Philippines

Lieutenant General Bartolome Bacarro
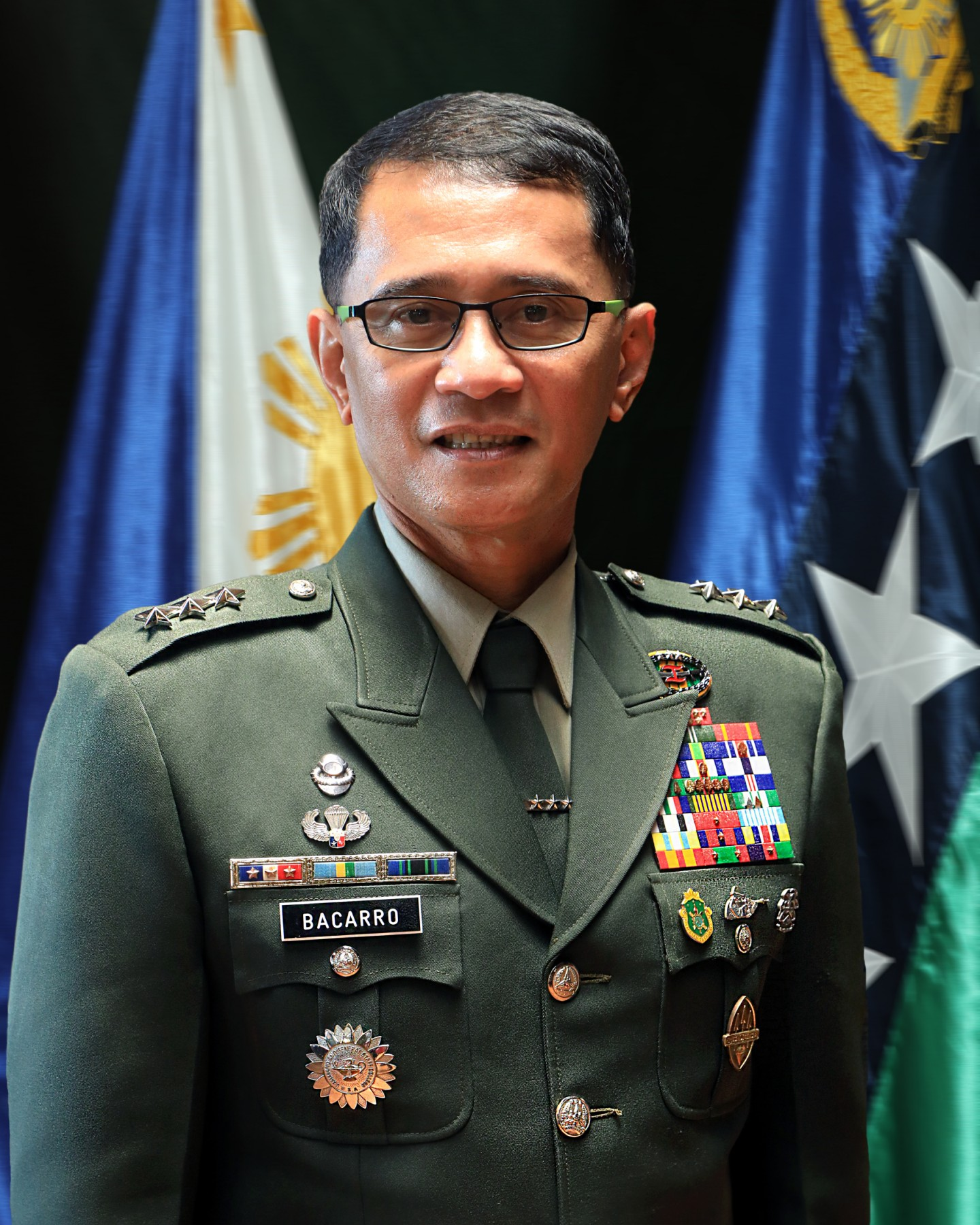
- Official portrait, 2022

58th Chief of Staff of the Armed Forces of the Philippines
- In office August 8, 2022 – January 6, 2023
- President: Bongbong Marcos
- Preceded by: Andres Centino
- Succeeded by: Andres Centino

Personal details
- Born: September 18, 1966 (age 60) San Fernando, La Union
- Spouse: Soledad Bonsato
- Children: 3
- Education: Philippine Military Academy (BS)
- Awards: Medal of Valor
- Nickname: "Bob"

Military service
- Allegiance: Philippines
- Branch: Philippine Army
- Years of service: 1988–2023
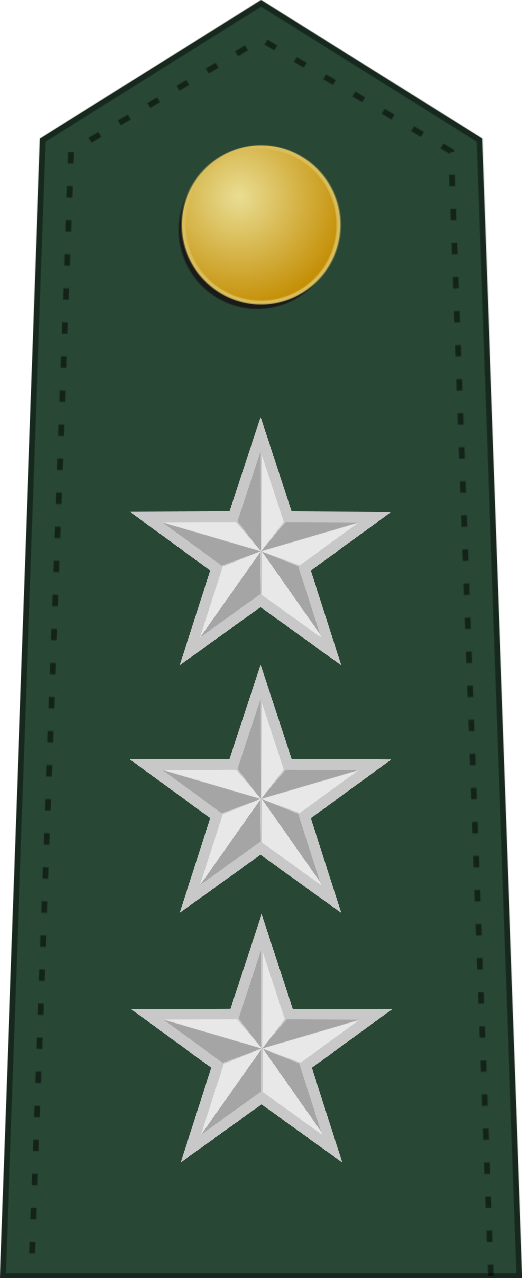
- Rank: Lieutenant general
- Commands: Chief of Staff of the Armed Forces of the Philippines; Southern Luzon Command; 2nd Infantry Division; PMA Commandant of Cadets; 502nd Infantry Brigade; 1st Infantry Battalion
- Battles/wars: Communist armed conflicts in the Philippines; Moro conflict; UNGCI

Bartolome Vicente "Bob" Orpilla Bacarro (born September 18, 1966) is a retired Philippine Army lieutenant general who served as the 58th chief of staff of the Armed Forces of the Philippines from 2022 to 2023. He previously commanded the Southern Luzon Command. In 1991, Bacarro was awarded the Armed Forces of the Philippines Medal of Valor for his actions against the New People's Army in Maconacon, Isabela.

== Early life and education ==
Bartolome Vicente Orpilla Bacarro was born on 18 September 1966 at San Fernando, La Union. Bacarro later graduated the Philippine Military Academy (PMA) as part of Maringal Class of 1988 earning his commission as a Philippine Army second lieutenant. Bacarro completed his Command and General Staff Course at the United States Army Command and General Staff College at Fort Leavenworth in Leavenworth, Kansas, USA. He also completed various courses locally such as the Basic and Advanced Infantry Officer Courses, the Basic Airborne Course and the Special Forces Combat Qualification Course. Bacarro also took courses overseas, such as the Combined Strategic Intelligence Training Program in Washington, D.C. and the Public Affairs Orientation Course in Hawaii.

== Military career ==
Throughout his military career in the Philippine Army, Bacarro first served his junior years in units under the command of the 5th Infantry Division in Isabela, where he was deployed amidst the rising incursions between the Army and the New People's Army in the province from 1988 to 1995. He also later served as an administrative commander, intelligence commander and operations commander of various units in the Army, and later served at the Civil-Military Operations Office and as a Secretary of the Army Staff. Bacarro also served under the Filipino Contingent on the UNGCI before being named as the spokesperson of the Philippine Army in November 2004, and was later named as the Chief of the Public Affairs Office. Bacarro later served as the Internal Auditor of the Armed Forces of the Philippines and Chief of Staff of the 4th Infantry Division in 2014 before serving as the Army Chief of Staff for Operations, OG3. Bacarro also assumed command of the 502nd Infantry Brigade, of the 2nd Infantry Division, and of the Cadet Corps of the Philippine Military Academy.

=== Commandant of Cadets ===
On September 18, 2019, Philippine Military Academy plebe Darwin Dormitorio was declared dead on arrival at the Fort del Pilar Hospital in Baguio due to injuries sustained from hazing at the academy. Separate investigations by the inspector general of the Armed Forces of the Philippines and by the secretary of justice Menardo Guevarra and National Bureau of Investigation ensued. Bacarro, together with the Philippine Military Academy superintendent, Lieutenant General Ronnie Evangelista, tendered his resignation "in the military tradition of command responsibility". Charges were filed against the two generals, but were cleared by Baguio Prosecutors for lack of probable cause.

=== Southern Luzon Command ===
On July 25, 2021, Bacarro replaced retiring Lieutenant General Antonio Parlade Jr. as commander of the Southern Luzon Command.

Representative Rufus Rodriguez of the 2nd District of Cagayan de Oro, the hometown of Cadet Darwin Dormitorio, appealed to recall the appointment of Bacarro and urged the Department of Justice to review the general's exoneration, specifically against the Anti-Hazing Act of 1995 that holds responsible those who could have prevented hazing activities but have not done so.

=== AFP Chief ===
In August 2022, President Bongbong Marcos appointed Bacarro as the chief of staff of the Armed Forces of the Philippines and replaced General Andres Centino. During his assumption speech, Bacarro emphasized his command thrust as UNITY, which stands for Unparalleled Professionalism, Noble utilization of resources, Invigorating capability development, Tenacity in sustaining gains, and Yearning for service excellence. Bacarro also mentioned the importance of time as a "highly valuable commodity" and also vowed to continue the AFP Modernization plans while creating careful monitoring measures due to the changes of warfare and the effects of the COVID-19 pandemic, and the Self Reliance Posture.

Bacarro's appointment was also the first under the appointment of President Bongbong Marcos under a fixed term of three years. A few months after his appointment, his term later came with controversy, as Bacarro's term, despite being the first officer to be under the fixed three year term, was junior to his predecessor General Centino. The controversy first made noise after the editorial made by then-AFP Spokesman retired Major General Edgard Arevalo in The Manila Times named "The fates of two AFP chiefs of staff", and later caused Centino's position as a four-star officer to be more senior compared to Bacarro, barring the latter to be promoted, and later caused a rumbling in the AFP hierarchy. Months later, Republic Act No. 11939 was made into law and prevented fixed the problems occurred under Republic Act No. 11709. On January 7, 2023, Bacarro was eventually replaced by his predecessor General Andres Centino, and retired from military service, a move aimed to fix the seniority issue under his appointment.

== Awards ==
=== Medal of Valor ===
In January 1991, then 2nd Lieutenant Bacarro was the commander of the 6th Citizen Armed Force Geographical Unit Active Auxiliary Company of the 5th Infantry Division's 21st Infantry Battalion. In Maconacon, Isabela, his unit figured in a 10-hour firefight against approximately 150 New People's Army rebels. Despite being wounded in his left thigh, he scaled a 9-foot fence surrounding the compound where his unit was pinned down by enemy fire. He then commandeered a truck and rammed the wall, providing his unit an exit point. He then had his wounded men evacuated, along with a wounded civilian. His 50-man force suffered three killed in action casualties and the communist rebels, sixteen.

He was subsequently awarded the Armed Forces of the Philippines Medal of Valor by President Corazon Cojuangco Aquino on July 1, 1991, for his actions.

==== Citation ====
"By direction of the President, pursuant to paragraph 1-6a, Section II, Chapter 1, AFP Regulations G131-053, General Headquarters, Armed Forces of the Philippines, dated 1 July 1991, the MEDAL FOR VALOR is hereby awarded to:

FIRST LIEUTENANT BARTOLOME VICENTE O. BACARRO 0-9864
PHILIPPINE ARMY

For acts of conspicuous courage, gallantry and intrepidity at the risk of life above and beyond the call of duty during a ten-hour encounter with about 150 fully armed communist terrorists that attacked the town of Maconacon, Isabela on 26 to 27 January 1991, while serving as Commanding Officer, 6th CAFGU Active Auxiliary Company, 21st Infantry Battalion, 5th Infantry Division, Philippine Army.

In spite of the overwhelming number of the armed insurgents and aware of the lack of air and artillery fire support and without any possible troop reinforcement due to time, location and weather constraints, then SECOND LIEUTENANT BACARRO courageously closed-in and engaged the enemy in a fierce firefight. Despite being wounded, he executed a systematic attack through proper maneuvers and strict adherence to fire discipline by firing only at sure enemy targets to conserve their ammunition and spare the civilians from being caught in the crossfire. He successful [sic] led his team in inflicting maximum casualty on the enemy. His display of unflinching and indomitable courage inspired and motivated his men to fight courageously.

Disregarding the pain and oozing blood due to the wound in his left thigh, he climbed a nine-foot high fence of the ACME compound even under heavy enemy fire, commandeered one dump truck, and rammed the fence that provided an entry point to his men outside, thereby releasing enemy pressure to the members of the Civilian Armed Forces Geographical Unit who were pinned down by the enemy inside the compound. He also extricated one wounded civilian, along with his men, for immediate treatment.

Under his leadership, his men fought ferociously, denying the enemy to overrun the town. His gallant efforts resulted in the killing of 16 terrorists, wounding of several others, recovery of 1 Caliber 7.62 mm M14 rifle, one Caliber .30 M1 Garand rifle, one claymore mine and one home-made land mine. By these outstanding deeds, FIRST LIEUTENANT BACARRO exemplified himself in combat in keeping with the finest tradition of Filipino soldiery."

=== Awards from military service ===
Throughout his military career, Bacarro has received the following awards and decorations:

- Medal of Valor
- Legionnaire, Philippine Legion of Honor
- Distinguished Service Star with one silver and one bronze anahaw leaf, 6 total medals
- 1 Silver Cross Medal
- Meritorious Achievement Medal with one silver anahaw leaf
- Distinguished Service Medal with one silver anahaw leaf
- Chief of Staff, AFP Commendation Medal
- Gawad sa Kaunlaran Medal
- Bronze Cross Medals with one bronze anahaw leaf, 2 total medals
- Silver Wing Medal with one bronze anahaw leaf, 2 total medals
- Wounded Personnel Medal
- Sagisag ng Ulirang Kawal Medal
- Military Merit Medal with one bronze spearhead device
- Military Merit Medal with one gold and four bronze anahaw leaves
- Military Civic Action Medal
- 1 Parangal sa Kapanalig ng Sandatahang Lakas ng Pilipinas Medal
- Military Commendation Medal with one silver and two bronze equilateral triangles
- Presidential Security Service Ribbon
- Long Service Medal with three service stars
- United Nations Service Medal
- United Nations UNGCI Ribbon
- Anti-dissidence Campaign Medal with one service star
- Luzon Anti-dissidence Campaign Medal
- Visayas Anti-Dissidence Campaign Medal
- Mindanao Anti-dissidence Campaign Medal with two service stars
- Disaster Relief and Rehabilitation Operations Ribbon

=== Unit decorations ===
- Presidential Unit Citation Badge
- February 1986 Revolution Unit Citation Badge
- Presidential Streamer Award
- People Power II Revolution Unit Citation Badge

=== Badges ===
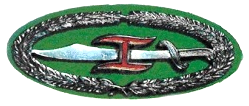
- Combat Commander's Kagitingan Badge
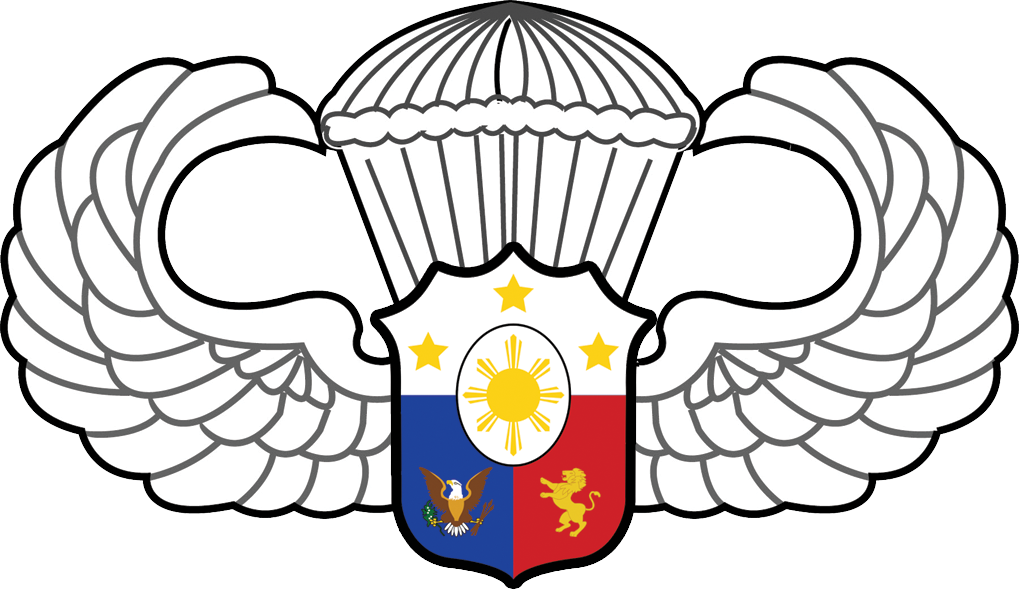
- AFP Parachutist Badge
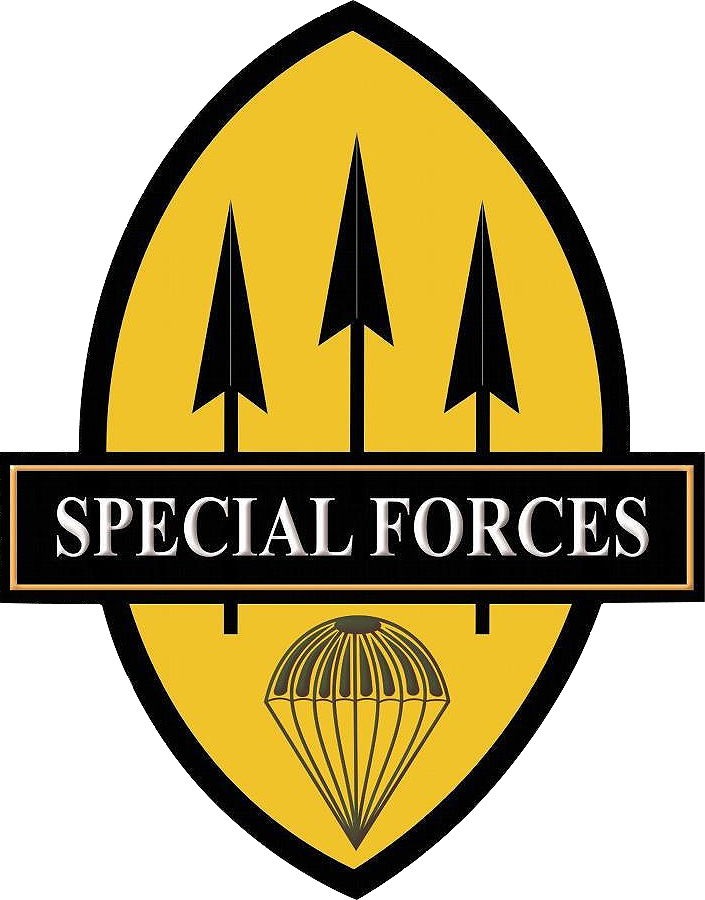
- Special Forces Qualification Badge
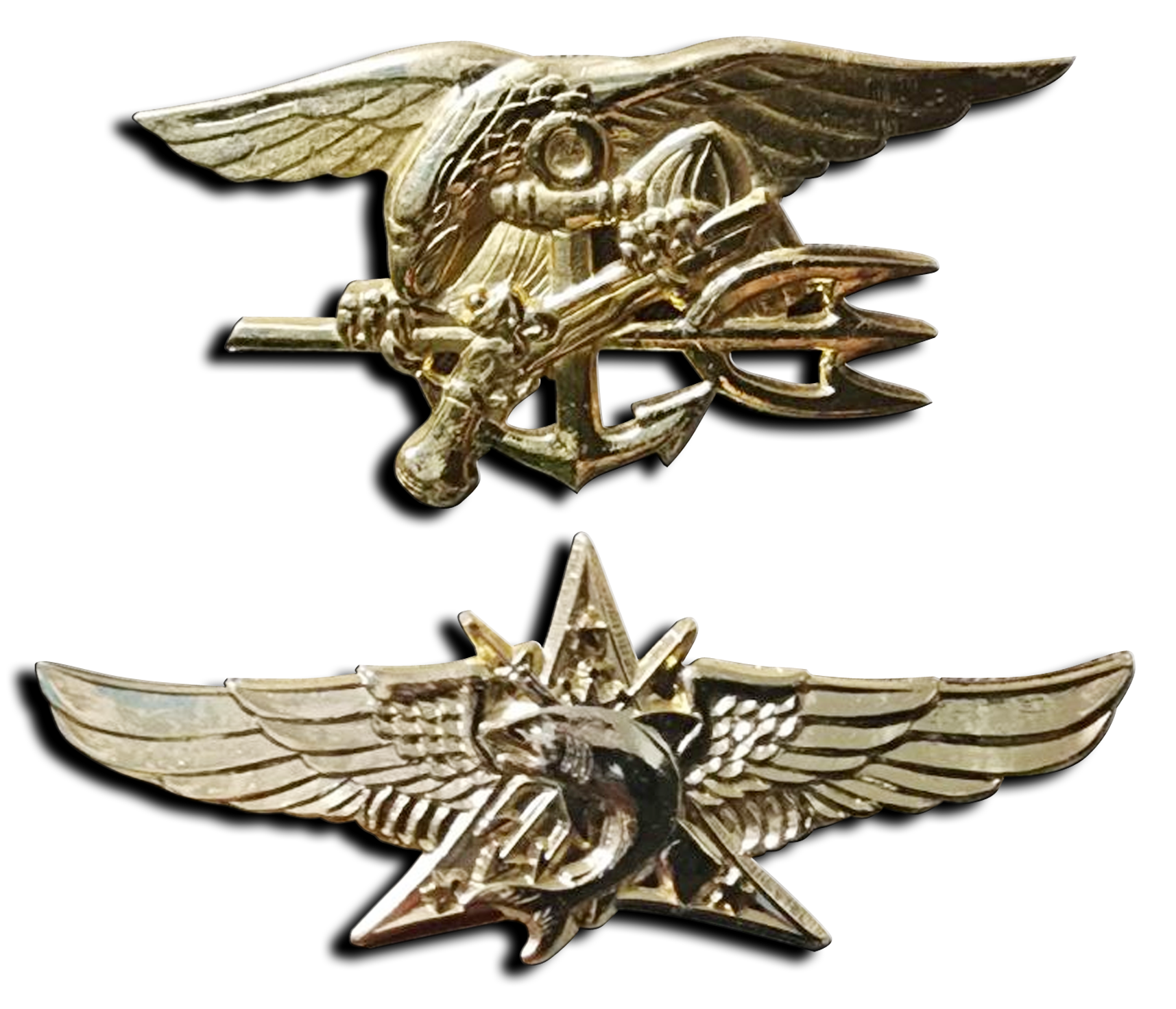
- Philippine Navy SEAL Team Badge
- 2nd Infantry Division Unit Badge
- United States Army Command and General Staff College International Graduate Badge

== Personal life ==
Bacarro is known by his peers and workmates as "Bob". He is married to Soledad Bonsato from Baguio with whom he has three children. During his stint as commander of the AFP Southern Luzon Command up till his term as AFP Chief, Bacarro is known for his Ketogenic diet as part of his lifestyle. Bacarro is also known for his "friendly personality" and his "close ties with the media".

Military offices
| Preceded by Greg T. Almerol | Commanding General of the 2nd Infantry Division; 2021 | Succeeded by Rowen S. Tolentino |
| Preceded by Antonio Parlade Jr. | Commanding General of the Southern Luzon Command; 2021–2022 | Succeeded by Armand M. Arevalo; Acting |
| Preceded by Andres Centino | Chief of Staff of the Armed Forces of the Philippines; 2022–2023 | Succeeded by Andres Centino |
