= Camp Guillermo Nakar =

Philippine military base in Lucena, Quezon

- Lucena, Quezon
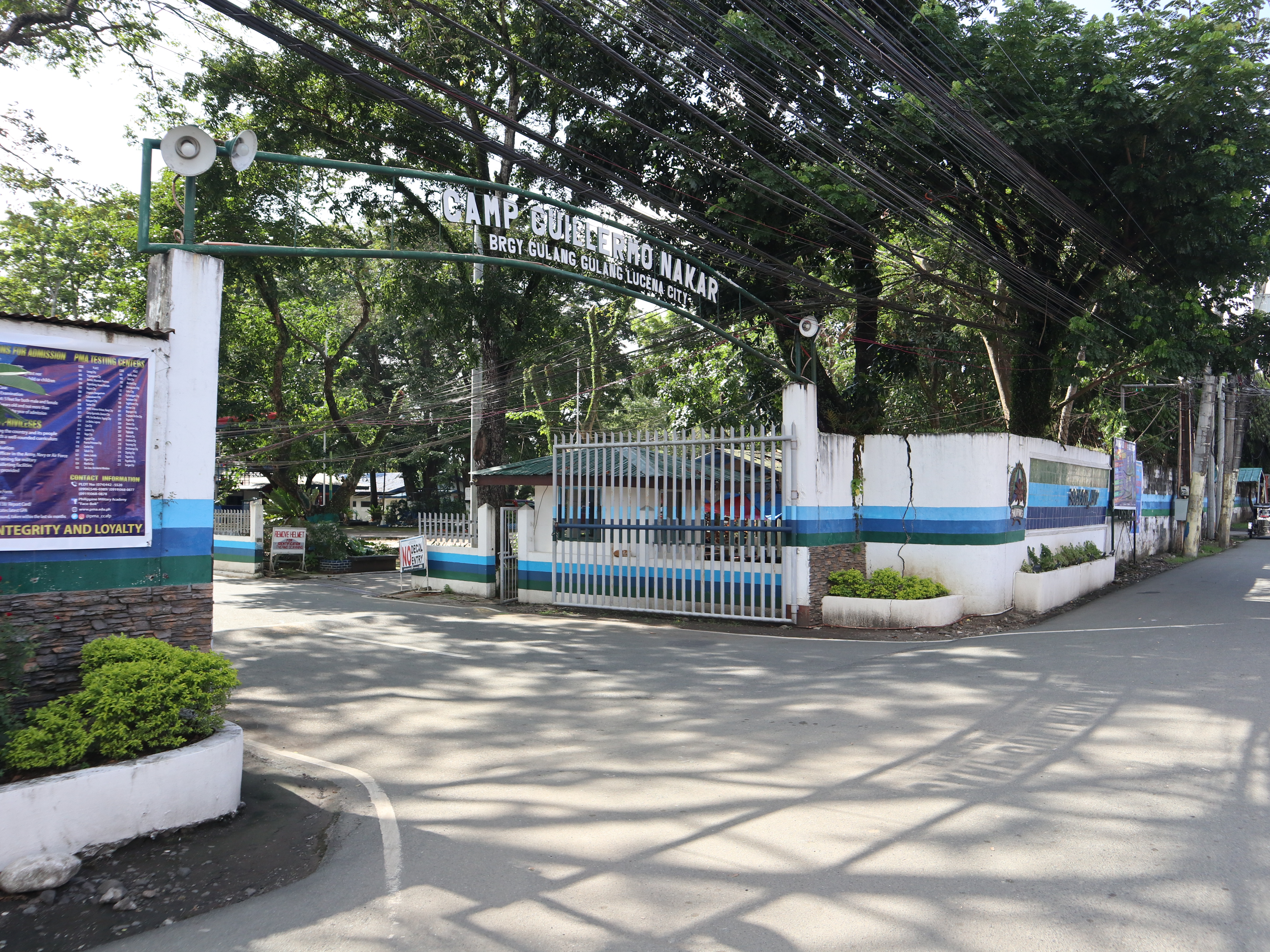

Site information
- Type: Military base
- Controlled by: Philippines

Location
- Location within Luzon Location within Philippines
- Coordinates: 13°57′17″N 121°36′33″E

Camp Guillermo Nakar is a military camp used by the Armed Forces of the Philippines in Lucena, Quezon. Formerly called Camp Wilhelm, it was renamed to its present name by AFP General Orders No. 266 issued on March 30, 1978 in honor of Guillermo Nakar, one of the first guerrilla leaders of the Philippine resistance against Japan during the Second World War. It is currently the headquarters of the AFP Southern Luzon Command. It contains an air field, a forensics and criminology office, and a basketball court near the front gate. It also has a few small apartment and duplexes which house both military personnel and civilians.
