= The truth will set you free =

Biblical adage

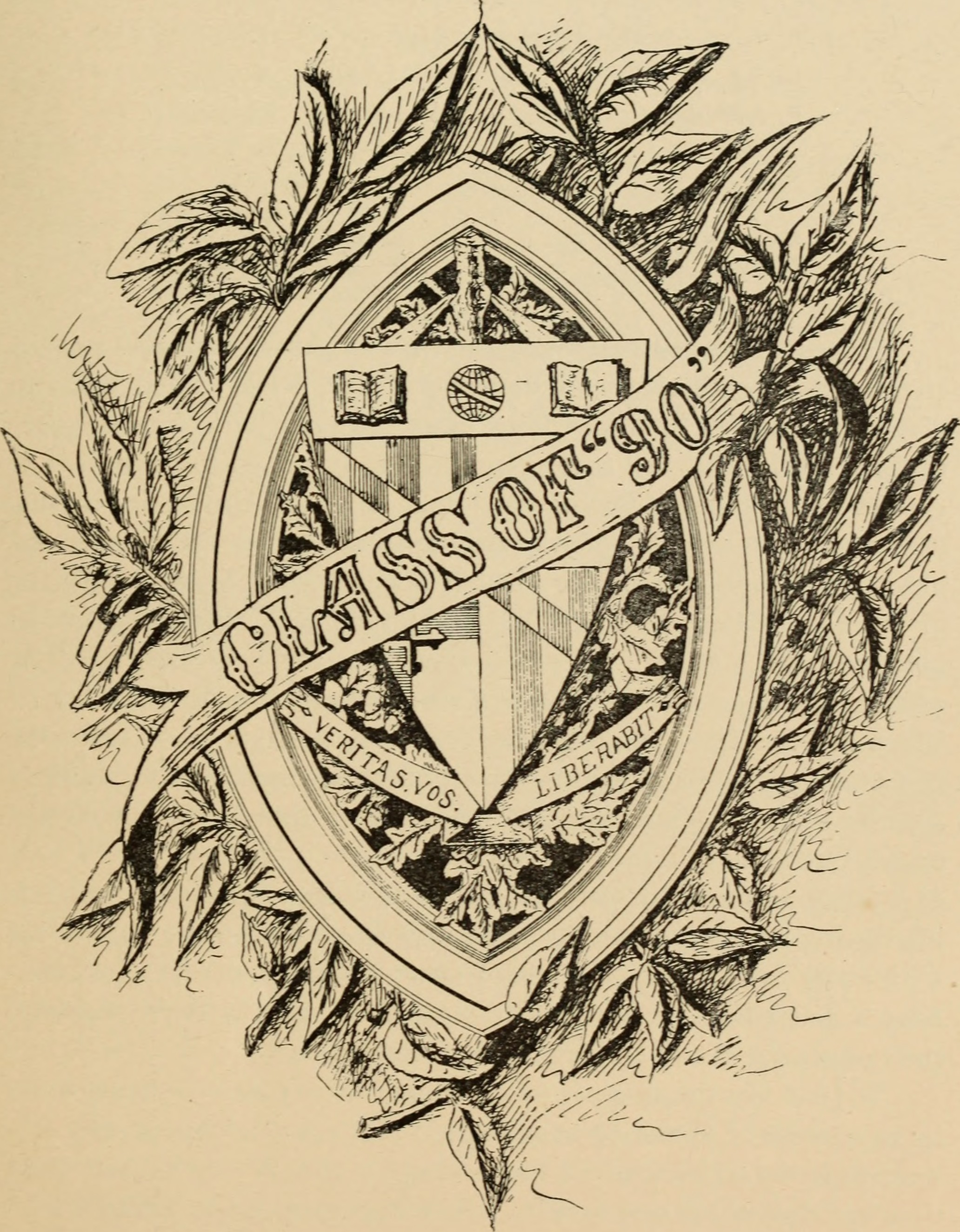
"Veritas vos liberabit" in the 1890 graduation book of Johns Hopkins University

"The truth will set you free" (Latin: Vēritās līberābit vōs (biblical) or Vēritās vōs līberābit (common), Greek: ἡ ἀλήθεια ἐλευθερώσει ὑμᾶς, transl. hē alḗtheia eleutherṓsei hūmâs) is a statement found in John 8:32—"And ye shall know the truth and the truth shall make you free" (KJV)—in which Jesus Christ addressed a group of Jews who believed that he was the messiah.

== Usage ==
=== Higher education ===
The phrase, in English or Latin, is used as the motto of many universities, colleges, and schools: Saint Vincent's College, Yonsei University, Caltech, Johns Hopkins University, University of Freiburg, Our Lady Seat of Wisdom College, Canterbury Christ Church University, Adelphi University, University of Portland, Idaho State University, Ottawa University, St. Augustine's University, Southern Methodist University, University of Tennessee, Lafayette College, Lutheran University of Brazil, St Thomas College, Thrissur, Mar Ivanios College, Andhra Christian College, Catholic University of Uruguay, Catholic University of Cordoba, University of San Martín de Porres, Doshisha University, Victoria University, City College of San Francisco, and the University of Guanajuato.

As examples, the verse itself, "Ye shall know the truth and the truth shall make you free", is inscribed on the Main Building at the University of Texas at Austin, on the Parks Library at Iowa State University and split into two sections above the entrances to the Knight Library at the University of Oregon. "The truth shall make you free" is also inscribed on "Old Vic", the Victoria College building at Victoria University in the University of Toronto as well as the main hall of McCain Library at Agnes Scott College.

The phrase in Greek is the official motto of Lenoir-Rhyne University.

The phrase in German, Die Wahrheit wird euch frei machen (lit. "The truth will make you free"), is the motto of the Albert Ludwig University of Freiburg.

=== Politics ===
The verse from the King James Version is carved in stone in the Original Headquarters Building (OHB) of the Central Intelligence Agency.

The phrase is in the Bible on the coat of arms of the Dominican Republic used since 1913.

The former president of Brazil, Jair Bolsonaro, commonly uses the phrase, which was his motto at the 2018 presidential election. After the Johnny Depp v. Amber Heard verdict on June 1, 2022, Bolsonaro tweeted the verse.
