= AFP Southern Luzon Command =

Philippine Military's unified branch command for Southern Luzon

Coordinates: 13°57′18.04″N 121°36′32.22″E

Southern Luzon Command
- Coat of Arms of the AFP Southern Luzon Command
- Active: 1 January 1987 – 15 January 2001; 27 March 2001 – Present
- Country: Philippines
- Role: Conventional and Unconventional Warfare, Anti-Guerrilla Operations
- Part of: Armed Forces of the Philippines
- Garrison/HQ: Camp Guillermo Nakar, Lucena City
- Nickname: SOLCOM
- Motto: Katapangan (Valor)
- Mascot: Dagger
- Anniversaries: January 1
- Engagements: Anti-guerilla operations against the NPA and local criminal elements
- Decorations: Philippine Republic Presidential Unit Citation Badge

Commanders
- Current commander: Lt.Gen. Cerilo C. Balaoro Jr.
- Notable commanders: LtGen. Ricardo Visaya, AFP; LtGen. Delfin Bangit, AFP; LtGen. Alexander Yano, AFP; LtGen. Pedro R. Cabuay, AFP; MGen. Roy Kyamko, AFP; MGen. Ernesto Carolina; MGen. Narciso Abaya, AFP; MGen. Diomedio Villanueva, AFP; MGen. Voltaire Gazmin, AFP; MGen. Clemente Mariano, AFP; BGen. Raymundo Jarque, AFP; MGen. Restituto Padilla, AFP; BGen. Alejandro A. Galido, AFP; MGen. Antonio R. Samonte, AFP

Insignia
- Unit Patch: Southern Luzon Command Emblem

The Southern Luzon Command (abbrv. as SOLCOM) is the Armed Forces of the Philippines' unified command in charge of the Calabarzon, Mimaropa and the Bicol region but excludes the Palawan Islands. It is responsible for the defense of these areas against external aggression, as well as combating terrorism and insurgency.

== History ==
=== Mission ===
Their mission is to conduct sustained Internal Security Operations (ISO) in Southern Luzon to neutralize the Communist-Terrorist Movement (CTM) and reduce their operational capabilities. One of their missions is to support local Law Enforcement as well as the Philippine National Police in containing the NPA while supporting the peace process; and destroy the JI network operating in their AOR. This is needed to establish a secured backdoor to mainland Luzon and maintain a physically & psychologically sound environment conducive to growth and development in this southernmost part of the island.

=== Lineage of Commanding Generals ===
- MGen. Restituto G. Padilla, AFP – (01 January 1987 – 30 June 1987)
- MGen. Antonio R. Samonte, AFP – (01 July 1987 – 25 March 1988)
- BGen. Alejandro A. Galido, AFP – (26 March 1988 – 26 January 1990)
- BGen. Evaristo G. Carino, AFP – (27 January 1990 – 18 March 1990)
- BGen. Federico F. Ruiz, AFP – (19 March 1990 – 22 March 1992)
- MGen. Cesar F. Fortuno, AFP – (23 March 1992 – 31 March 1993)
- BGen. Raymundo T. Jarque, AFP – (31 March 1993 – 30 January 1994)
- MGen. Oswaldo P. Villanueva, AFP – (08 March 1994 – 20 July 1995)
- MGen. Clemente P. Mariano, AFP – (23 July 1995 – 19 March 1996)
- MGen. Jose Maria G. Solquillo, AFP – (15 March 1996 – 22 April 1997)
- MGen. Samuel T. Dunque, AFP – (22 June 1997 – 27 August 1998)
- MGen. Voltaire T. Gazmin, AFP – (21 September 1998 – 16 July 1999)
- MGen. Diomedio P. Villanueva, AFP – (16 July 1999 – 01 March 2000)
- MGen. Jose S. Lachica, AFP – (01 March 2000 – 16 March 2001)
- MGen. Narciso L. Abaya, AFP – (28 March 2001 – 12 December 2001)
- MGen. Ernesto G. Carolina, AFP – (13 December 2001 – 21 May 2002)
- MGen. Roy V. Kyamko, AFP – (23 May 2002 – 11 May 2003)
- LtGen. Alfonso P. Dagudag, AFP – (12 May 2003 – 26 October 2004)
- LtGen. Pedro R. Cabuay, AFP – (26 October 2004 – 30 July 2006)
- LtGen. Alexander B. Yano, AFP – (31 July 2006 – 24 August 2007)
- LtGen. Rodolfo S. Obaniana, AFP – (25 August 2007 – 06 May 2008 )
- LtGen. Delfin N. Bangit, AFP – (06 May 2008 – 01 May 2009)
- LtGen. Roland M. Detabali, AFP – (01 May 2009 – 16 July 2012)
- MGen. Eduardo D. del Rosario, AFP – (16 July 2012 – 28 September 2012) (acting)
- MGen. Alan R. Luga, AFP – (28 September 2012 – 04 March 2013)
- LtGen. Caesar Ronnie F. Ordoyo, AFP – (04 March 2013 – 08 September 2014)
- LtGen. Ricardo R. Visaya, AFP – (08 September 2014 – 01 July 2016)
- MGen. Romeo G. Gan, AFP – (01 July 2016 – 15 August 2016) (acting)
- LtGen. Ferdinand F. Quidilla, AFP – (15 August 2016 – 18 August 2017)
- LtGen. Benjamin R. Madrigal Jr., AFP – (18 August 2017 – 14 December 2017)
- LtGen. Danilo G. Pamonag, AFP – (14 December 2017 – 15 January 2019)
- LtGen. Gilbert I. Gapay, AFP – (15 January 2019 – 06 December 2019)
- MGen. Arnulfo Marcelo B. Burgos Jr., AFP – (06 December 2019 – 17 January 2020) (acting)
- LtGen. Antonio G. Parlade Jr., AFP – (17 January 2020 – 24 July 2021)
- LtGen. Bartolome Vicente O. Bacarro, AFP – (24 July 2021 – 08 August 2022)
- BGen. Armand M. Arevalo, AFP – (08 August 2022 – 25 November 2022) (acting)
- LtGen. Efren P. Baluyot, AFP – (25 November 2022 – 02 March 2024)
- LtGen. Facundo O. Palafox IV, AFP - (02 March 2024 - 01 May 2025)
- BGen. Aldwine I Almase, AFP - (01 May 2025 - 07 July 2025) (acting)
- LtGen. Cerilo C. Balaoro Jr., AFP (07 July 2025 - Present)

== Organization ==
The following are the units that are under the Southern Luzon Command.

- 2nd Infantry (Jungle Fighter) Division, PA
- 9th Infantry (SPEAR) Division, PA
- Naval Forces Southern Luzon, PN
- Tactical Operations Wing Southern Luzon, PAF

== Operations ==
- Anti-guerrilla operations against the New People's Army
- Anti-terrorist operations against known terror groups operating in their AOR.

== Awards and decorations ==
=== Campaign streamers ===
Award Streamer	Streamer Name	Operation	Date Awarded	Reference
	Presidential Unit Citation Badge	SAR/DRR Ops, TS Ketsana	4 February 2010	General Orders No. 112, GHQ-AFP, dtd 04 Feb '10
	Presidential Unit Citation Badge	General Elections, Philippines	1 July 2010	General Orders No. 641, GHQ-AFP, dtd 1 July '10

=== Badges ===
Military Badge	Badge Name	Operation	Date Awarded	Reference
	AFP Election Duty Badge	General Elections, Philippines	21 May 2010	General Orders No. 513, GHQ-AFP, dtd 21 May '10
