= Alexander Yano =

Philippine Army general

Ambassador, General, PLH Alexander Badong Yano
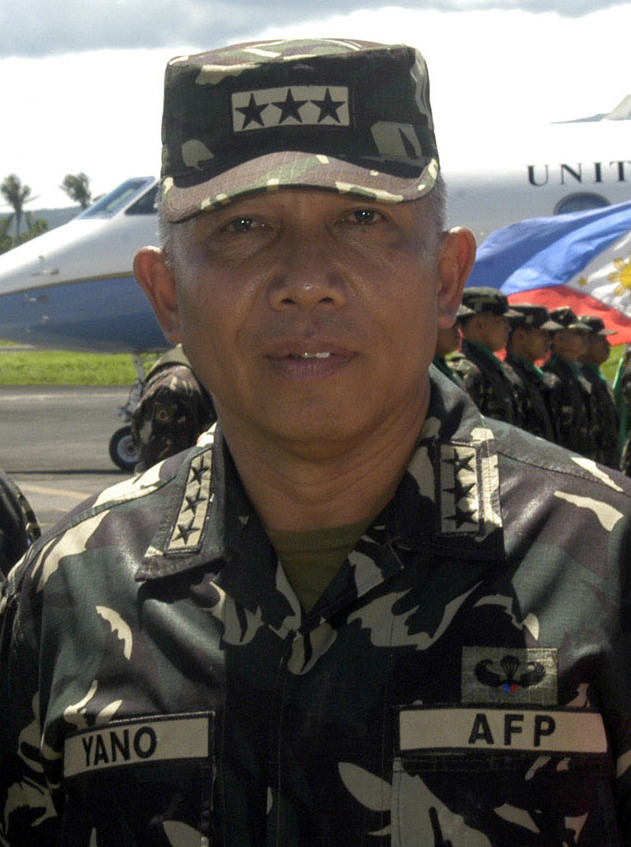
- General Alexander B. Yano

37th Chief of Staff of the Armed Forces of the Philippines
- In office May 12, 2008 – May 1, 2009
- President: Gloria Macapagal Arroyo
- Preceded by: Gen. Hermogenes Esperon
- Succeeded by: Gen. Victor Ibrado

Personal details
- Born: Sindangan, Zamboanga del Norte, Philippines
- Spouse: Estela Aragon
- Children: 1
- Education: Saint Vincent's College; Cebu Institute of Technology; Philippine Military Academy (Class of 1976)

Military service
- Allegiance: Philippine
- Branch/service: Armed Forces of the Philippines; Philippine Army
- Years of service: 1976-2009
- Rank: General
- Commands: Armed Forces of the Philippines; Commanding General, Philippine Army; Commander, AFP Southern Luzon Command; Commanding General, 2nd Infantry Division, PA; 601st Infantry Brigade, 6ID, PA

Alexander Badong Yano is a retired Philippine Army general who served as the 38th Chief of Staff of the Armed Forces of the Philippines, the highest position in the AFP hierarchy. His Vice Chief of Staff was Lt. Gen. Cardozo M. Luna and his Deputy Chief of Staff was Lt. Gen. Rodrigo F. Maclang. Alexander Yano also served as the commander of the Philippine Army and Southern Luzon Command. He is also the first general born from Mindanao

== Background ==
Alexander Yano was born to the late Iñigo Yano and Gloria Badong, who were public school teachers. He is married to the former Estela Aragon from La Union, a retired military nurse. They have a son, Ervin Andrew.

Yano is the eldest of five siblings, including Philippine Defense and Armed Forces Attache Brigadier General Cesar B. Yano, a diplomat in Washington, D.C., and also a Philippine Military Academy Class 1980 graduate.

== Education ==
He graduated from the public elementary school of said town in 1965 as Salutatorian and later studied in high school in Saint Vincent's College in Dipolog and graduated with honors in 1969. He initially took up 3 years of Civil Engineering studies in Cebu Institute of Technology before taking the entrance examinations of the Philippine Military Academy. He entered the prestigious military institution in 1972 and graduated in 1976. As a PMA cadet, he excelled more in athletics and extra-curricular activities. Among others, he established two (2) PMA athletic records, in high jump and 400-meter low hurdles. The hurdles record remains unbroken up to this day. As a graduating cadet, he was also the regimental adjutant of the PMA Cadet Corps, a coveted position that aptly recognized his early leadership potentials.

He later on completed and topped in all his military trainings in the Philippines and abroad. Among these courses are the following: Special Forces Operations Course; Field Artillery Officers Course; Pre-Command Course for Battalion Commanders and the Command and General Staff Course. He also finished the Infantry Officers Advance Course in the US Army Infantry School, Fort Benning, and Georgia, United States and landed in the Commandant's List as an Honor Graduate.

== Military career ==
Upon graduation from PMA, Yano was commissioned and called to active duty with the Philippine Army. He spent his early years in the military service mostly in combat assignments in Northern and Central Luzon and the provinces of Samar during the height of the CPP/NPA rebellion in the 1970s and 1980s. Yano hugged the limelight when, as Task Force Zamboanga Chief, he acted as overall ground tactical commander during the infamous Cabatangan crisis in 2001 that led to the successful release of over a hundred civilian hostages and eventually liberated the Cabatangan Complex in Zamboanga City from over 300 fully armed MNLF Breakaway Group elements. This crucial battle earned him the moniker “Liberator of Cabatangan” from the late City Mayor – Maria Clara Lobregat.

After his duty tour in Zamboanga City, he was personally handpicked by then SOUTHCOM Chief Gen Roy Cimatu to command the 601st Army Brigade in Socsargen at the height of terrorist bombings that rocked General Santos in 2002. During his over two-year stint as Brigade Comdr, no single terrorist bombing occurred in General Santos. He earned his 1st star-rank as Brigade Commander in 2003, the first in his PMA batch to become a general. He was also declared as "adopted son" of General Santos in recognition of his invaluable contributions to that city.

He later served as Assistant Division Comdr of the 9th Infantry Division in Bicol and concurrently as Chairperson of the Government Coordinating Committee on the Cessation of Hostilities with the MILF for his proven competence and abilities especially in understanding the intricacies of the Mindanao conflict. He then, briefly served as Chief of the AFP's Civil Relations Service and concurrent AFP Spokesperson where he ably articulated the AFP's position on various defence and security issues. With Gen. Generoso Senga as then Army Chief, Yano was personally plucked from Camp Aguinaldo to assume as Chief of Staff of the Philippine Army where he earned his Second Star (MAJ General) in April 2005, again, the 1st to earn said rank in his class.

As a testament to his exemplary achievements, he received various military awards, including: 4 Distinguished Service Stars; Philippine Legion of Honor (Degree of Officer); 4 Outstanding Achievement Medals; Gold Cross Medal for gallantry in combat; Bronze Cross Medal and 27 Military Merit Medals. He had also been twice awarded as “Most Outstanding Zamboanga del Norte Citizen” in 2003 and in 2005. He received the “Outstanding Alumnus Award” from Saint Vincent's College in Dipolog in December 2005. Likewise, he was conferred the “PMA Achievement Award” by PMA in Baguio in November 2005.

The Commission on Appointments (CA) finally confirmed on June 11, 2008, en masse several top government officials, including Yano amid walk outs by Senators Jamby Madrigal and Panfilo Lacson.

On May 1, 2009, he retired one-month earlier and he was succeeded by Lt. Gen. Victor Ibrado of Philippine Army as the chief of staff. He's been appointed by President Gloria Macapagal Arroyo as ambassador to Brunei Darrussalam. The reason for his early retirement is to prepare himself for the confirmation of his appointment by the Commission of Appointments by June 2009.

== Awards ==
- Philippine Republic Presidential Unit Citation
- – Long Service Medal
- – Visayas Anti-Dissidence Campaign Medal
- – Mindanao Anti-Dissidence Campaign Medal
- Anti-Dissidence Campaign Medal
- – Gold Cross (Philippines)
- – Philippine Legion of Honor (Officer)
- – Distinguished Service Star
- – Military Merit Medal (Philippines)
- – Bronze Cross Medal
- – Military Civic Action Medal
- Gawad sa Kaunlaran
- Military Commendation Medal
- Disaster Relief and Rehabilitation Operations Ribbon
- Honorary Airborne Wings from the Royal Thai Army
- AFP Parachutist Badge
- Combat Commander's Badge (Philippines)
- Scout Ranger Qualification Badge
- Special Forces Qualification Badge

Military offices
Preceded by Lt. Gen. Samuel Bagasin	AFP Southern Luzon - Commander; 31 July 2006 - 24 August 07	Succeeded by Lt. Gen. Rodolfo Obaniana
Preceded by Lt. Gen. Romeo Tolentino	Philippine Army - Commander; 24 August 07–12 May 08	Succeeded by Lt. Gen. Victor Ibrado
Preceded by Gen. Hermogenes Esperon	Armed Forces of The Philippines - Chief of Staff; 12 May 2008 - 1 May 2009	Succeeded by Gen. Victor Ibrado

== Political career ==
Yano ran for Mayor of the Municipality of Sindangan, Zamboanga del Norte for the 2019 Philippine general election, but was defeated by former Congressman Rosendo Labadlabad.

== Electoral history ==
2019 Sindangan Mayoralty Election
Party	Candidate	Votes	%
PDP–Laban	Rosendo "Dodoy" Labadlabad	27,767	
APP	Alexander Yano	17,413	
NPC	Ritche "Bong" Macias	2,788	
Independent	Lourdes Ranas	98	
Total votes			
