= Rowen Tolentino =

Rowen Tolentino LLH
- Alma mater: Philippine Military Academy (BS)
- Military career
- Allegiance: Philippines
- Branch: Philippine Army
- Service years: 1989 - 2024: Superintendent, Philippine Military Academy; 2nd Infantry Division; Chief of Staff, Philippine Army; 703rd Infantry Brigade; 2nd Mechanized Battalion; 4th Mechanized Battalion
- Conflicts: Moro conflict CPP-NPA-NDF conflict

Rowen S. Tolentino is a retired Filipino military general who previously served as the Superintendent, Philippine Military Academy. Tolentino is a graduate of the PMA Makatao Class of 1989 also served as commander of the 2nd Infantry Division, the 703rd Infantry Brigade, the 2nd Mechanized Battalion, and the 4th Mechanized Battalion.

== Background ==
Tolentino became a graduate of the PMA Makatao Class of 1989 and later enrolled in various courses at home and abroad, such as the AFP Command & General Staff Course, the Basic Airborne Course, and the Special Forces Combat Qualification Course in 2008. He also completed the Project Planning, Development and Management course in 2004, and later earned a Master of Business Administration in 2007, before completing the Senior Executive Course on National Security in 2015. Tolentino finished the Armor Captain's Career Course in the United States Army Armor School at Fort Benning, Columbus, Georgia in 2001.

Tolentino's first assignment as a second lieutenant was his deployment at Negros Occidental, where he served under the command of the 3rd Infantry Division. Tolentino later served as a Platoon Leader and as Company Executive Officer of the 61st Infantry Battalion, before being named as Chief of Management Branch of the Management and Fiscal Office and the Fiscal Operations Branch at Fort Bonifacio.

Tolentino later served as a battalion commander of the 4th Mechanized Battalion and the 2nd Mechanized Battalion, before serving as the Assistant Chief of Staff for Civil Military Operations, G7 and as Assistant Chief of Staff for Operations, G3, under the Armor "Pambato" Division. Tolentino was named as the 18th brigade commander of the 703rd Infantry Brigade and in 2019, Tolentino was named as the Chief of Staff of the Philippine Army. On 2020, Tolentino was named as Deputy Commander of the AFP Training and Doctrine Command before becoming the division commander of the 2nd Infantry Division on 27 July 2021, where he replaced then-Major General Bartolome Vicente Bacarro.

On 12 August 2022, Tolentino was named as the Superintendent, Philippine Military Academy, where he replaced then Acting Superintendent of the PMA Brigadier General Julius Tomines. During his term as PMA Superintendent, Tolentino initiated measures to train future PMA officers on external defense and joint operations, after decades of prioritizing internal defense and counterinsurgency operations. Tolentino was also the first superintendent to serve under a fixed term, where his term was originally intended for four years. His fixed term was later cut short into 2 years after various changes were made under the creation of the Republic Act No. 11939. Tolentino's term as PMA superintendent ended on 20 July 2024, upon the expiration of his 2-year fixed term and was replaced by Rear Admiral Caesar Valencia.
