= Andres Centino =

57th and 59th chief of staff of the Armed Forces of the Philippines

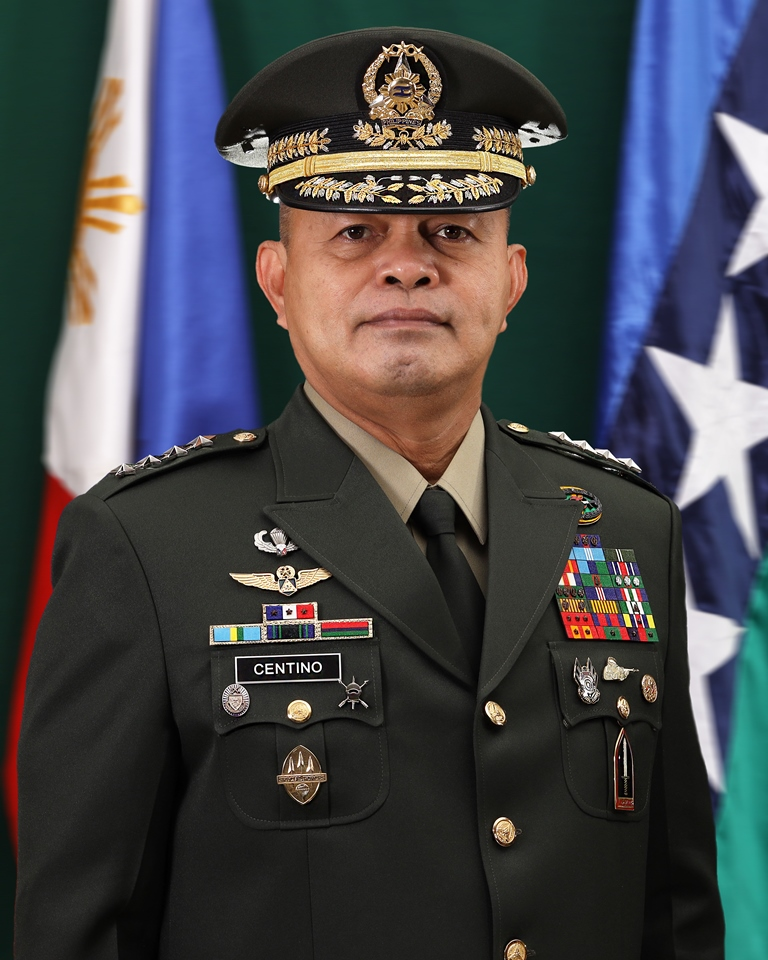
- Official portrait, 2023

Presidential Assistant for Maritime Concerns
- Incumbent
- Assumed office September 28, 2023
- President: Bongbong Marcos

57th and 59th Chief of Staff of the Armed Forces of the Philippines
- In office January 6, 2023 – July 21, 2023
- President: Bongbong Marcos
- Preceded by: Bartolome Bacarro
- Succeeded by: Romeo Brawner
- In office November 12, 2021 – August 8, 2022
- President: Rodrigo Duterte; Bongbong Marcos
- Preceded by: Jose Faustino
- Succeeded by: Bartolome Bacarro

63rd Commanding General of the Philippine Army
- In office May 14, 2021 – December 10, 2021
- President: Rodrigo Duterte
- Preceded by: Jose Faustino
- Succeeded by: Romeo Brawner

Personal details
- Born: Andres Castor Centino; February 4, 1967 (age 59) Tacloban, Leyte, Philippines
- Spouse: Sheila Sucalit
- Children: 4
- Education: Philippine Military Academy (BS); University of the Philippines Cebu (MBA); National Defense University (MSc)
- Awards: Philippine Legion of Honor

Military service
- Branch: Philippine Army
- Years of service: 1988–2023
- Rank: General
- Commands: Chief of Staff of the Armed Forces of the Philippines; Commanding General of the Philippine Army; 4th Infantry Division; 401st Infantry Brigade; 26th Infantry Battalion

Andres Castor Centino (born February 4, 1967) is a retired Philippine Army general who currently serves as Presidential Assistant for Maritime Concerns to President Bongbong Marcos since September 28, 2023.

Centino last served as the 57th and 59th Chief of Staff of the Armed Forces of the Philippines from November 2021 to August 2022 and from January to July 2023. He also previously served as the 63rd Commanding General of the Philippine Army from May to December 2021.

== Early life and education ==
Centino was born on February 4, 1967, in Tacloban, Leyte, and grew up in Cebu City, Cebu. There, he attended the University of the Philippines High School Cebu. His mother, Araceli (née Castor), was a school teacher and probation officer in the Parole and Probation Administration, and his father, Flaviano Centino, was a lawyer who served in the Armed Forces of the Philippines' Judge Advocate General Service Reserve Unit.

In 1984, at the encouragement of his father, Centino entered the Philippine Military Academy. He graduated with a Bachelor of Science degree cum laude as part of the 1988 Maringal Class and earned his commission as a second lieutenant of the Philippine Army.

Throughout his military career, Centino attended various military leadership and intelligence courses, including the 1st Scout Ranger Regiment course, infantry officer courses, counterintelligence operations courses, and the Command and General Staff Course at the Armed Forces of the Philippines Command and General Staff College, where he finished as part of the top ten of his class.

Centino also holds a Master of Business Administration from the School of Management of the University of the Philippines Cebu, and a Master of Science in National Resource Strategy from the Eisenhower School of the National Defense University in Washington, D.C.

== Military career ==
Following his commission, Centino's assignments included Army General Staff Secretary in Fort Bonifacio, 4th Infantry Division chief of staff, 26th Infantry Battalion commander, 401st Infantry Brigade commander, and Deputy Chief of Staff for Operations, Organization, and Training, J3 at Camp Aguinaldo.

=== 4th Infantry Division ===
Centino assumed command of the 4th Infantry Division based in Camp Evangelista, Cagayan de Oro on May 28, 2020, and subsequently served as commander of Joint Task Force Diamond.

Infantry operations against the New People's Army intensified within Centino's area of command even amidst the effects COVID-19 pandemic in the Philippines. He implemented the whole-of-nation approach in ending communist armed conflicts in the Philippines outlined in President Rodrigo Duterte's Executive Order No. 70, s. 2018. During his tenure, the 4th Infantry Division was lauded as a unit for its offensive operations against the New People's Army.

=== Commanding General of the Philippine Army ===
Centino was appointed Commanding General of the Philippine Army on May 18, 2021. In his initial message to the Philippine Army at Fort Bonifacio, Centino laid out his priorities on the continued modernization of the army, meritocracy based promotion among its officers, and the recruitment of qualified aspirants to the uniformed service.

The appointment came after the removal of then-acting Commanding General, Jose Faustino after having served for only 87 days. Faustino's appointment drew criticisms from Senator Panfilo Lacson during a Commission on Appointments confirmation hearing due to his ineligibility to the position even in an acting capacity based on Section 4 of Republic Act No. 8186.

=== Chief of Staff of the Armed Forces of the Philippines ===
On November 12, 2021, Centino was appointed Chief of Staff of the Armed Forces of the Philippines by President Rodrigo Duterte. Centino's appointment was confirmed by the Commission on Appointments with the concurrent rank of general on January 26, 2022.

The 2022 Philippine presidential election coincided with Centino's tenure, and he directed the Armed Forces to ensure proper observance electoral procedure throughout the country and provide additional security during the campaign period and election day. The Armed Forces also worked to ensure a peaceful transition of power from the Duterte administration to the Marcos Jr. administration.

Centino continued to serve under President Bongbong Marcos until August 8, 2022. Lieutenant General Bartolome Bacarro was appointed to the position to succeed him.

Due to Centino's first appointment having taken effect prior to Republic Act No. 11709, his relinquishment of the Chief of Staff office did not retire him from military service. In line with previous legal precedent, his mandatory age of retirement was at 56 and he would continue to hold the rank of general until then. Consequently, because there can only be one 4-star general in active military duty at any given moment by law, Bacarro was prevented from promotion to 4-star general albeit occupying the concurrent Chief of Staff office.

==== Reappointment under the Marcos Jr. administration ====
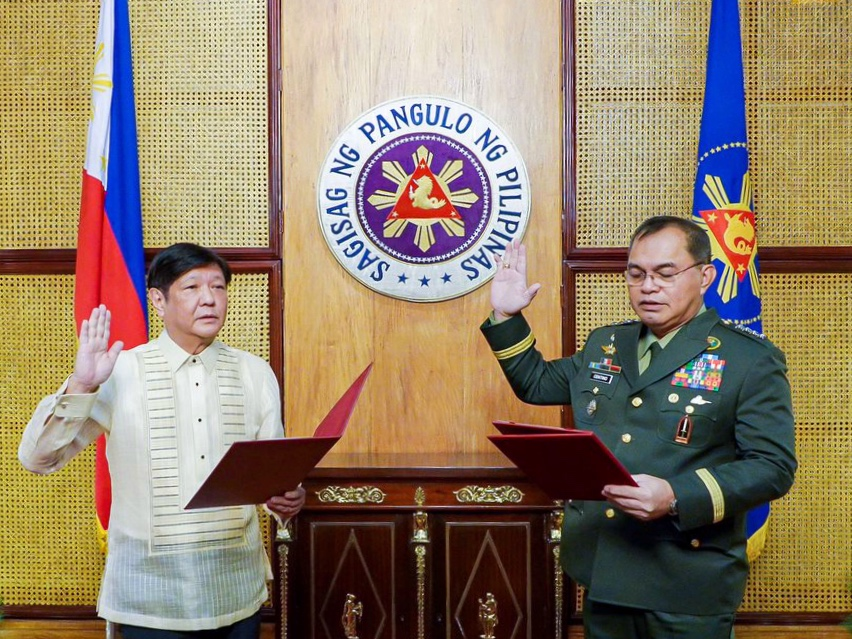
President Marcos Jr. swears in General Centino as Chief of Staff in Malacañang on January 6, 2023.

On January 6, 2023, Centino was reappointed as the Chief of Staff of the Armed Forces of the Philippines by President Bongbong Marcos His reappointment under Republic Act No. 11709 granted him tenure past the previous mandatory age of 56.

Centino served as Chief of Staff under President Marcos Jr. until July 21, 2023, and retired from military service.

== Presidential Assistant on Maritime Concerns ==
Centino was appointed as Presidential Assistant on Maritime Concerns by President Ferdinand Marcos Jr. on September 28, 2023.

The position holds the rank of secretary and is under the Office of the President.

== Personal life ==
Centino is married to Sheila Sy Sucalit, and together they have three sons and a daughter.

== Awards and decorations ==
Centino has received the following awards and decorations:

=== National awards ===
- August 8, 2022: Philippine Legion of Honor, Rank of Chief Commander
- July 21, 2023: Philippine Legion of Honor, Rank of Chief Commander

=== Military decorations ===
- Distinguished Service Star with four bronze anahaw leaves
- Gawad sa Kapayapaan Medal
- Gold Cross Medal
- Silver Cross Medal
- Meritorious Achievement Medal
- Chief of Staff, AFP Commendation Medal
- Bronze Cross Medal
- Silver Wing Medal
- Military Merit Medal with four silver and one bronze anahaw leaves
- Sagisag ng Ulirang Kawal Medal
- Military Civic Action Medal
- Parangal sa Kapanalig ng Sandatahang Lakas ng Pilipinas Medal with two bronze anahaw leaves
- Military Commendation Medal with one bronze equilateral triangle

==== Campaign and service medals ====
- Long Service Medal with three bronze service stars
- Anti-Dissidence Campaign Medal
- Luzon Anti-Dissidence Campaign Medal with two bronze service stars
- Visayas Anti-Dissidence Campaign Medal with two bronze service stars
- Mindanao Anti-Dissidence Campaign Medal with one bronze service star
- Disaster Relief & Rehabilitation Operation Ribbon with two bronze service stars
- Kalayaan Island Group Campaign Medal
- Northern Maritime Frontier Campaign Medal

==== Unit decorations ====
- Presidential Unit Citation Badge
- February 1986 Revolution Unit Citation Badge
- People Power II Revolution Unit Citation Badge
- Martial Law Unit Citation Badge

==== Badges ====
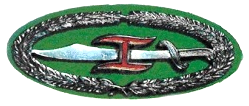
- Combat Commander's Kagitingan Badge
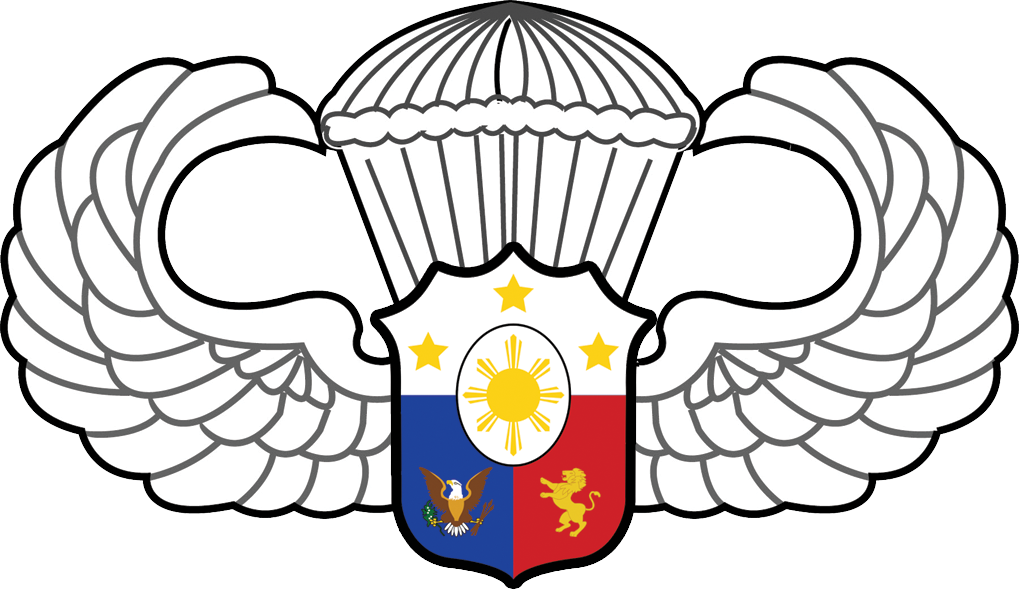
- AFP Parachutist Badge
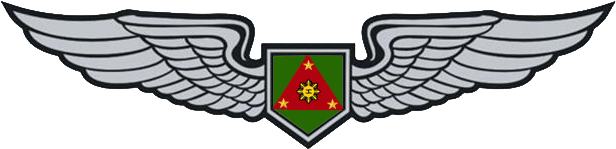
- Army Aviation Service Badge
- Presidential Security Command Badge
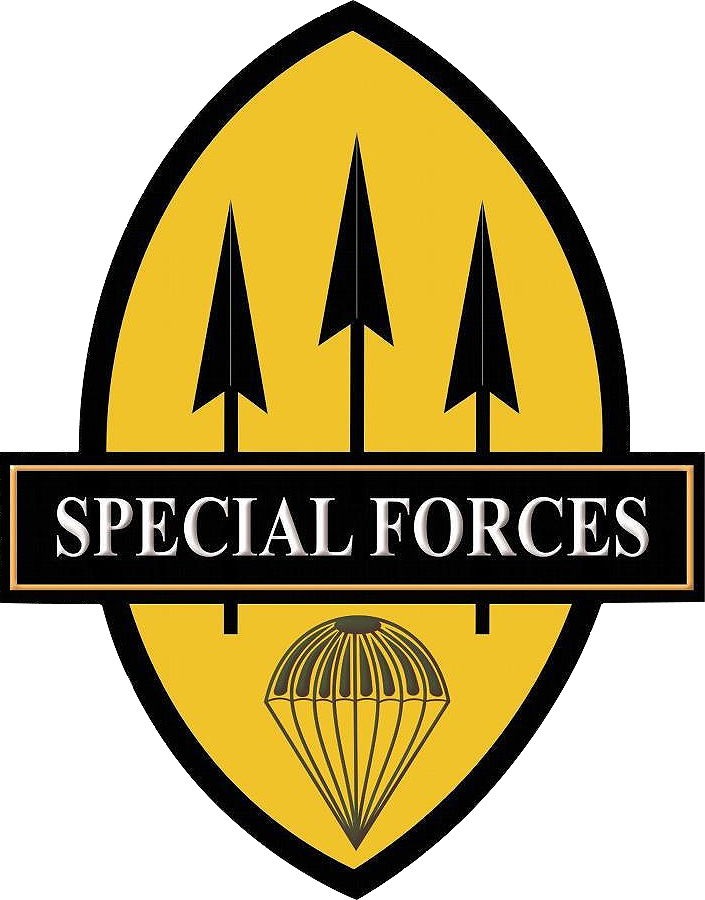
- Special Forces Qualification Badge
- Scout Ranger Qualification Badge

Military offices
| Preceded by Franco Nemesio Gacal | Commander of the 4th Infantry Division; 2020–2021 | Succeeded by Romeo Brawner Jr. |
| Preceded by Jose Faustino Jr. Acting | Commanding General of the Philippine Army; 2021 | Succeeded by Romeo Brawner Jr. |
| Preceded by Jose Faustino Jr. | Chief of Staff of the Armed Forces of the Philippines; 2021–2022 | Succeeded by Bartolome Vicente Bacarro |
| Preceded by Bartolome Vicente Bacarro | Chief of Staff of the Armed Forces of the Philippines; 2023 | Succeeded by Romeo Brawner Jr. |
Political offices
| New office | Presidential Assistant for Maritime Concerns; 2023–present | Incumbent |
