= Delfin Bangit =

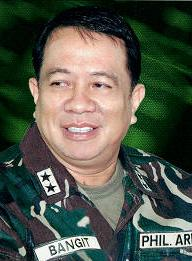
- Gen. Delfin N. Bangit

39th Chief of Staff of the Armed Forces of the Philippines
- In office March 2010 – June 2010
- President: Gloria Macapagal Arroyo
- Preceded by: Victor Ibrado
- Succeeded by: Nestor Ochoa (acting)

Personal details
- Born: Delfin N. Bangit; 1955
- Died: December 2013 (aged 57–58) Quezon City, Metro Manila, Philippines
- Education: Philippine Military Academy
- Profession: Military

Military service
- Allegiance: Republic of the Philippines
- Branch/service: Philippine Army
- Years of service: 1978–2010
- Rank: General
- Commands: Chief of Staff, Armed Forces of the Philippines; Commanding General of the Philippine Army; Commander, AFP Southern Luzon Command; Commanding General, 2nd Infantry Division, PA; Commander, Presidential Security Group; Commander, Intelligence Service of the Armed Forces of the Philippines

Delfin N. Bangit was a retired Philippine Army general who served as the 39th Chief of Staff, Armed Forces of the Philippines for four months in 2010. He is a graduate of the Philippine Military Academy.

== Military career ==
General Bangit who hails from San Mateo, Rizal is a graduate of the Philippine Military Academy Makatarungan Class 1978, the former Chief of Staff, Armed Forces of the Philippines, Camp General Emilio Aguinaldo, Quezon City, and the 51st Commanding General, Philippine Army.

General Bangit's professional attributes and personal character led him in handling various commands as head of the AFP and Army Units. Among which was his primacy to commandership and emphasis on obedience and discipline in achieving command and unit goals. He also adopted the operational framework of development as both a goal and a tool in attaining peace, unity and better governance. His emphasis on good governance as the military's contribution in society was achieved through a responsive government while at the same time insuring the participation and collectiveness of the society, all directed to address the root and social causes of insurgency. This paradigm led him and his command to receive significant praises and recognitions.

=== Command assignments ===
Prior retirement, General Bangit served as the 39th Chief of Staff of the Armed Forces of the Philippines. Shortest stint CG of the AFP. He also led the whole Philippine Army as its 51st Commanding General from 1 May 2009 to 10 March 2010. His other command positions were: Commander of the Southern Luzon Command (SOLCOM), AFP from 6 May 2008 to 5 May 2009; Commanding General of the 2nd Infantry ("Jungle Fighter") Division, Philippine Army based at Tanay Rizal from 11 September 2007 to 6 May 2008; the Chief of the Intelligence Service, AFP from 16 August 2006 to 5 September 2007; the Group Commander of the Presidential Security Group from 12 February 2003 to 11 September 2007; the Commanding Officer of the Presidential Escort Battalion from 15 February 2001 to 12 February 2003; the Battalion Commander of 2nd Infantry ("Second to None") Battalion, 2nd Infantry Division, Philippine Army from 10 April 1996 to 1 May 1997; and Company Commander, Alpha Company, 2nd Infantry Battalion, 2nd Infantry Division, Philippine Army.

=== Staff duties ===
He also served staff duties which include: the Chief of Staff, Intelligence and Security Group, Philippine Army from 16 May 1997 to 16 August 1998; the Assistant Chief of Staff for Intelligence (G2), 4th Infantry Division, Philippine Army; and Area Command Staff for Intelligence, SOLCOM, AFP.

=== Trainings ===
General Bangit's command experience and staff assignments honed his military skills while his leadership and management skills were shaped by actual experiences in the battlefield as well as from various courses and trainings. He was a graduate of the Command and Staff Course at the Australian Army Command and Staff College; Pre-Commander Course for Battalion Commander and Infantry Officer Advance Course, both taken at the Combat Arms School, Training Command, Philippine Army; Anti-Urban Terrorist Patrol Training at the Louisiana State Police Academy; and the Foreign Officer Tactical Intelligence Course at the School for Military Intel in Australia. He finished his Master of Defense Studies from the University of Canberra, Australia in 2000.

=== Awards ===
Throughout his military career, his service and sacrifices were rewarded with the following honors and awards:

- The United States of America Legion of Merit (Degree of Commander)
- Philippine Legion of Honor (Degree of Chief Commander, and Commander)
- Five (5) Distinguished Service Stars
- Anti-Dissidence Campaign Medal
- Luzon Anti Dissidence Campaign Medal
- Visayas Anti-Dissidence Campaign Medal
- Mindanao Anti-dissidence Campaign Medal
- Long Service Medal
- Gawad sa Kaunlaran
- Three Bronze Cross Medals;
- Silver Wing Medal;
- Twenty (20) Military Merit Medals
- Military Commendation Medal
- Military Civic Action Medal
- Philippine Republic Presidential Unit Citation
- Special Forces Qualification Badge
- Combat Commander's Badge (Philippines)
- Scout Ranger Qualification Badge
- Combat Commander "K" Badge;
- U.S. Military Commendation Medal, among others.

Military offices
Preceded by Lt. Gen. Rodolfo Obaniana	AFP Southern Luzon – Commander; 6 May 2008 – 1 May 2009	Succeeded by Lt. Gen. Roland Detabali
Preceded by Lt. Gen. Victor S. Ibrado	Philippine Army – Commander; 4 May 2009 – 12 March 2010	Succeeded by Lt. Gen. Reynaldo B. Mapagu
Preceded by Gen. Victor S. Ibrado	Armed Forces of The Philippines – Chief of Staff; 10 March 2010 – 22 June 2010	Succeeded by Lt. Gen. Nestor Ochoa

== Private life ==
"Del", as he was commonly called, was married to Daisy Magdangal – Bangit and they have three children, namely Harold, Diane, and Hector.

== Death ==
Bangit died due to multiple organ failure at the St. Luke's Medical Center in Quezon City on 13 December 2013.
