= Saint Vincent's College =

Roman Catholic college in Zamboanga del Norte, Philippines

St. Vincent's College Incorporated
- Former names: Dipolog Parochial School; Saint Vincent's School
- Motto: Veritas Liberabit Vos (Latin)
- Motto in English: The truth will set you free.
- Type: Private sectarian (Roman Catholic)
- Established: June 17, 1917 (109 years and 57 days)
- Chairman: Most Rev. Severo C. Caermare, D.D.
- President: Rev. Fr. Nathaniele A. Denlaoso
- Location: Padre Ramon Street, Estaka, Dipolog, Zamboanga del Norte, 7100, Philippines; 8.585278°N 123.345556°E
- Campus: Basic Education Campus (Padre Ramon Street corner Capitol Avenue, Estaka)
- Colors: Blue
- Nickname: SVCI
- Website: svc.edu.ph

Saint Vincent’s College (Spanish: Colegio de San Vicente), officially known as St. Vincent's College Incorporated (SVC or SVCI), is a private Roman Catholic higher educational institution in Dipolog, Zamboanga del Norte, Philippines. Founded as Dipolog Parochial School in 1917, it now offers programs from kindergarten to postgraduate levels.

Alumni and students of the college are referred to as Vincentians.

== History ==
Dipolog Parochial School was founded on June 17, 1917, by a number of Jesuit priests.

In 1947, newly-appointed director Rev. Fr. Engracio S. Rivera, created the school motto, "Induamor Arma Lucis", meaning "Let us clad ourselves with the armor of light". College level education was introduced, followed by the establishment of a girls' department. The school was renamed St Vincent's College on February 28, 1950, in honor of St. Vincent Ferrer, the second patron saint of the town.

== Description ==
St. Vincent's College is a private, sectarian, non-stock and non-profit institution approved and authorized by the Department of Education and the Commission on Higher Education to offer course programs from kindergarten to postgraduate levels. SVC was the first institution in the Province of Zamboanga del Norte to be granted government authority and recognition to offer a doctorate degree.

It is located on Padre Jose Ramon Street, Estaka, Dipolog, Zamboanga del Norte.

Alumni and students of the college are referred to as "Vincentians".

== Notable Vincentians ==
- General Alexander B. Yano (HS, 1969) - 38th Chief of Staff of the Armed Forces of the Philippines, and former ambassador to Brunei Darrussalam
- Lawyer, Samuel G. Dagpin Jr.,RME (HS, 1985)- Chairman of the Governance Commission for Government Owned and Controlled Corporation, GCG (2016 to 2022) with the rank of Secretary- Graduate of Ateneo de Davao University, College of Law, Class of 2001

== See also ==
- Roman Catholic Diocese of Dipolog
