= Roy Kyamko =

Filipino military leader

Lt. Gen. Roy Kyamko (Ret.) was head of the Armed Forces of the Philippines Southern Command (Southcom) during operations against the Abu Sayyaf Group in 2004.

== See also ==
- Military history of the Philippines
- History of the Philippine Army
- List of conflicts in the Philippines
- List of wars involving the Philippines
