= Habeas corpus in the Philippines =

Habeas corpus (/ˈheɪbiəs ˈkɔːrpəs/; Latin for "you [shall] have the body") is a legal action or writ by means of which detainees can seek relief from unlawful imprisonment. In the Bill of Rights of the Philippine constitution, habeas corpus is guaranteed in terms almost identically to those used in the U.S. Constitution. Article 3, Section 15 of the Constitution of the Philippines states that "The privilege of the writ of habeas corpus shall not be suspended except in cases of invasion or rebellion when the public safety requires it".

== History ==
=== American period ===
In response to continuing unrest, the Philippine Commission availed itself of an option in the Philippine Organic Act of 1902, 32 Stat. 692, and on January 31, 1905, requested that Governor-General Luke Edward Wright suspend the writ of habeas corpus. He did so the same day, and habeas corpus was suspended until he revoked his proclamation on October 15, 1905. The suspension gave rise to the United States Supreme Court case Fischer v. Baker, 203 U.S. 174 (1906).

=== Marcos administration ===
In 1971, after the Plaza Miranda bombing, the Marcos administration, under Ferdinand Marcos, suspended habeas corpus in an effort to stifle the oncoming insurgency, having blamed the Filipino Communist Party for the events of August 21. Many considered this to be a prelude to Martial Law. After widespread protests, however, the Marcos administration decided to reintroduce the writ. In December 2009 under Arroyo Administration, habeas corpus was suspended in Maguindanao as the province was placed under martial law. This occurred in response to the Maguindanao massacre.

== Law ==
According to Section 13 of the 1987 Constitution "All persons, except those charged with offenses punishable by reclusion perpetua when evidence of guilt is strong, shall, before conviction, be bailable by sufficient sureties, or be released on recognizance as may be provided by law. The right to bail shall not be impaired even when the privilege of the writ of habeas corpus is suspended. Excessive bail shall not be required."
