= 2nd Infantry Division (Philippines) =

- Active: 1936 - April 09, 1942 (as 2nd Regular Division, PCA); March 19, 1976 – present
- Country: Philippines
- Branch: Philippine Army
- Type: Infantry
- Role: Conventional Warfare, Anti-Guerrilla Operations
- Size: 3 Brigades
- Part of: United States Army (1936–1942); Philippine Army (1976–present)
- Garrison/HQ: Camp General Mateo M. Capinpin, Tanay, Rizal
- Nickname: Jungle Fighter Division
- Motto: Advocates of Peace. Servants of the People. Defenders of Southern Tagalog.
- Mascot: Jungle Popoy
- Anniversaries: March 19
- Engagements: World War II * Philippines campaign (1941–1942) * Battle of Bataan (1942); Anti-guerilla operations against the NPA and local criminal elements
- Decorations: Presidential Streamer Award

Commanders
- Current commander: Major General Cerilo Balaoro Jr., PA
- Notable commanders: MGen Guillermo Francisco, PC; BGen Domingo R Tucay AFP; BGen Teodorico R Almuete AFP; BGen Juan L Razo AFP; BGen Ramon L Cannu AFP; BGen Zoshimo C Carlos AFP; BGen Roland I Pattugalan AFP; BGen Restituto C Padilla AFP; BGen Alejandro A Galido AFP; BGen Raul T Aquino AFP; BGen Javier D Carbonnel AFP; BGen Thelmo Y Cunanan AFP; BGen Cesar F Fortuno AFP; BGen Regino J Lacson AFP; BGen Romeo D Lopez AFP; BGen Samuel T Dungque AFP; BGen Rolando C Bautista AFP; MGen Jose S Lachica AFP; MGen Roberto P Santiago AFP; MGen Jacinto C Ligot AFP; MGen Efren L Abu AFP; MGen Gabriel M Ledesma AFP; MGen Pedro R Cabuay Jr AFP; MGen Efren P Orbon AFP; MGen ALexander B Yano AFP; MGen Fernando L Mesa AFP; MGen Delfin N Bangit AFP; MGen Roland M Detabali AFP; BGen Florante B Martinez AFP; MGen Jorge V Segovia AFP; MGen Jessie D Dellosa AFP; BGen Nestor A Annonuevo AFP; MGen Romulo M Bambao AFP; MGen Eduardo D Del Rosario AFP; MGen Nonato Alfredo T Peralta Jr AFP; MGen Rodelio V Santos AFP; MGen Romeo G Gan AFP; MGen Rhoderick M Parayno AFP; BGen Elias H Escarcha AFP; MGen Arnulfo Marcelo B Burgos Jr AFP; MGen Greg T Almerol AFP; MGen Bartolome Vicente Bacarro AFP

Insignia
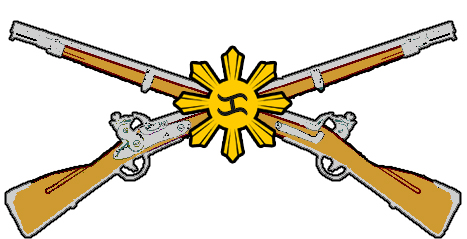
- Armed Forces Occupational Specialty Insignia

The 2nd Infantry Division, Philippine Army nicknamed Jungle Fighter, is the Philippine Army's primary infantry unit specializing in jungle warfare.

== History ==
=== 2nd Regular Division, Philippine Commonwealth Army during World War II under the Japanese Invasion ===
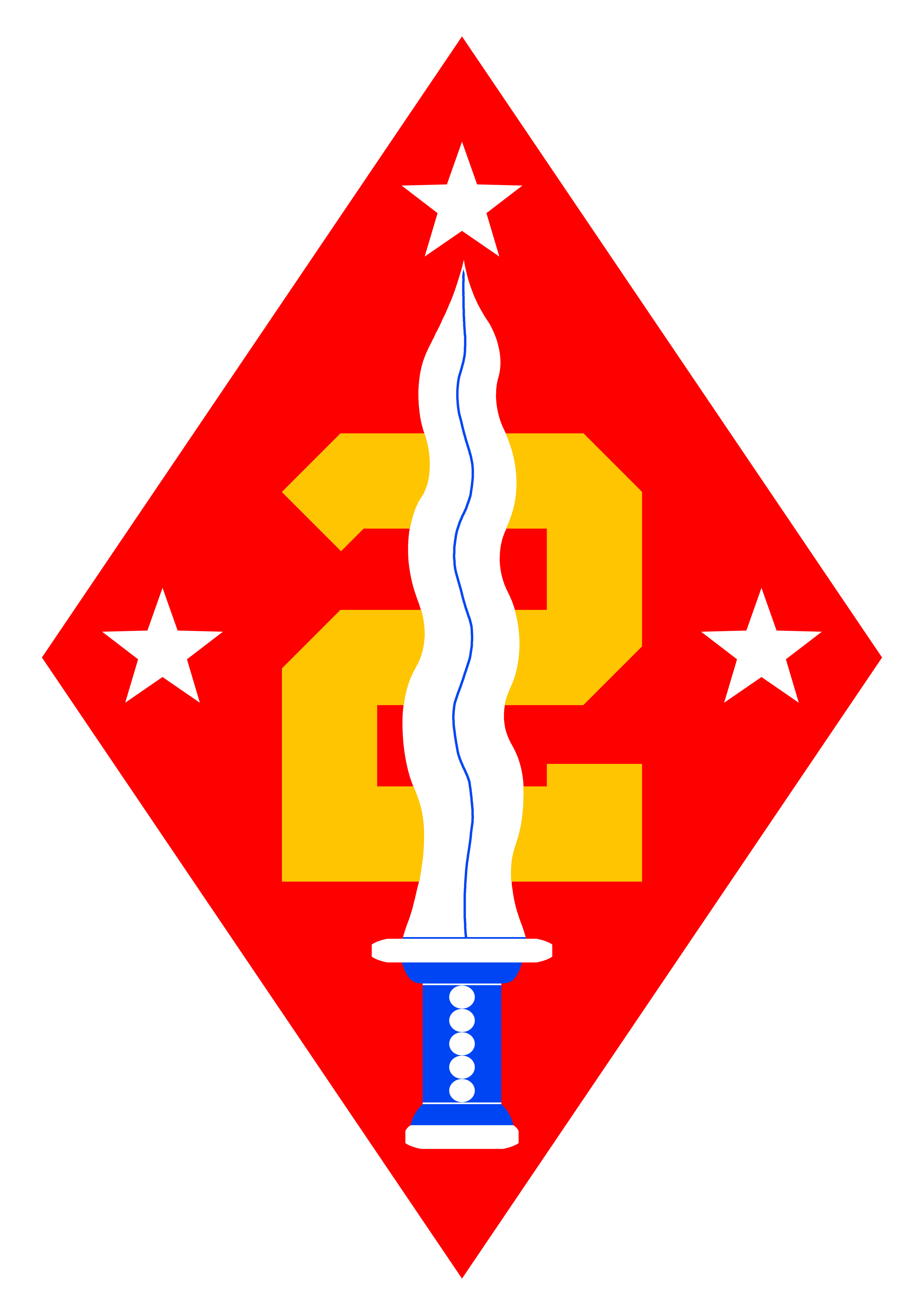
2nd Philippine Division Emblem 1941-42 (gold version)

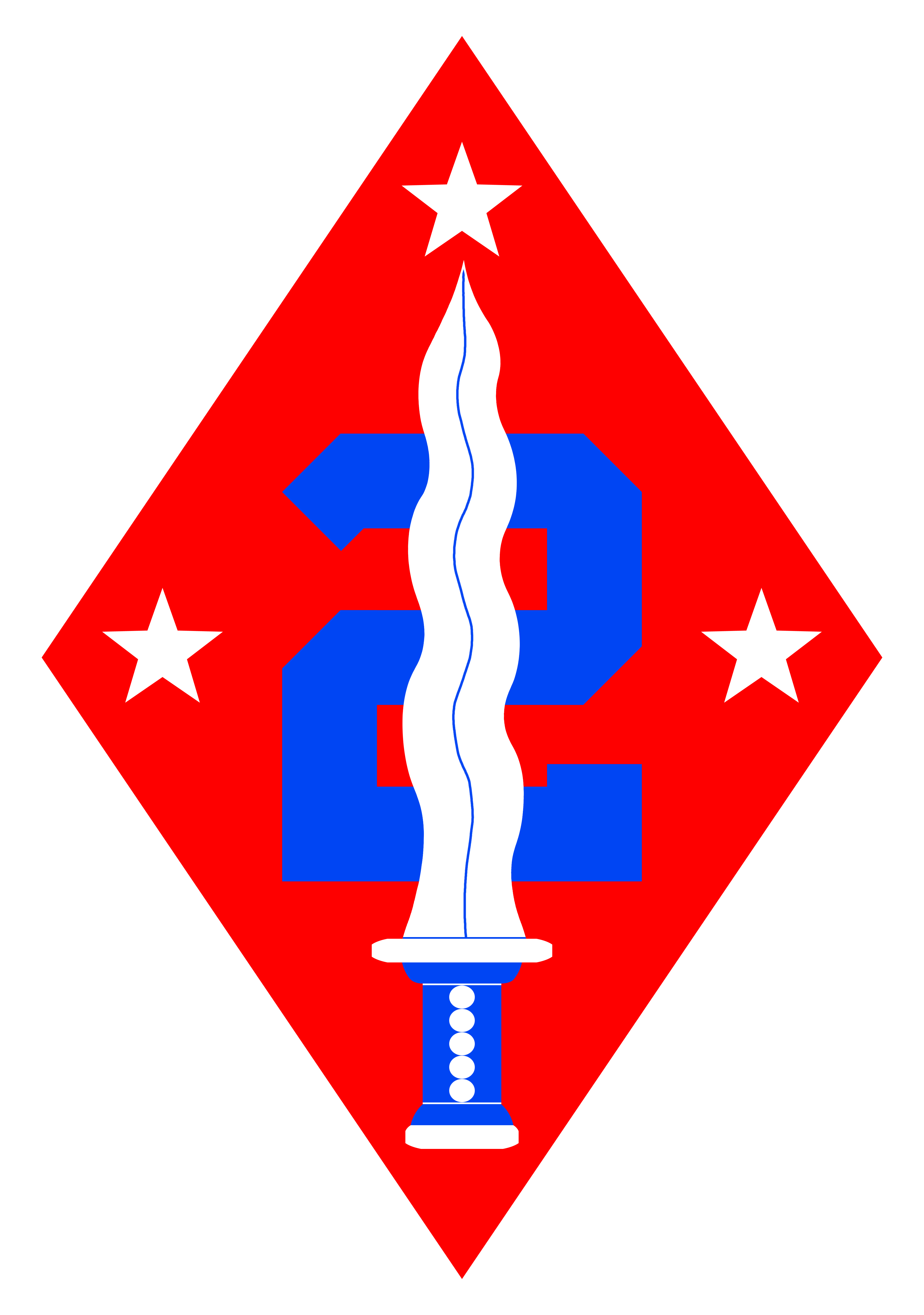
2nd Philippine Division Emblem 1941-42 (blue version)

The 2nd Regular Division, Philippine Commonwealth Army, was activated 6 January 1942, uniting the 4 existing Philippine Constabulary Regiments under one divisional command. Part of these troops were at Camp Murphy (now Camp Emilio Aguinaldo) in Quezon City and part at Fort William McKinley (now Fort Andres Bonifacio) in Taguig, Rizal (now part of Metro Manila). The Armed Forces reorganization acts passed in 1936 led to the decision to militarize Constabulary (Police) officers into organized fighting units. The Constabulary reverted to their original semi-military ("gendarme") structure in 1938. But the need for more armed Filipinos to aid in resisting the rise and possible threat of Japanese military operations in mid-1941 led to the re-establishment of formal military organization of the Constabulary forces. Therefore, the organization of four regiments finally got underway in the early Fall of 1941, and upon activation, each regiment was inducted into the tables of organization and orders of battle for the United States Army Forces in the Far East (USAFFE). The 1st Philippine Constabulary Regiment dates from 15 Oct 1941; the 2nd Regiment from 17 Nov 1941; the 3rd Regiment from 12 Dec 1941; and the 4th Regiment from 29 Dec 1941.

Most of the 1st Regiment and all of the 2nd had been guarding public utilities and other targets of potential sabotage in the Manila metro area. By 31 Dec 1941, the 3rd and newly formed 4th Regiments were on Bataan, or were en route. But after the withdrawal of American troops from Manila (to avoid a battle in the city) the 1st and 2nd Regiments also moved to Bataan. Here they were moved under the umbrella of the new 2nd Division (PC) (Philippine Constabulary) after its activation on 6 January 1942. The 2nd Division commander was BGen. (later MGen.) Guillermo B. Francisco and American Col. Edwin O'Connor as senior instructor of the division.

The 2nd Division was at Bataan from 6 Jan 1942 to the fall of the peninsula on 9 Apr 1942, aiding Gen. Douglas MacArthur's USAFFE military forces, against the Imperial Japanese troops led by General Masaharu Homma during the Battle of Bataan. T12 half-tracks and Bren gun carriers were assigned to the 2nd Division which marks the first time that armor was used by the Philippine Army in war.

Throughout the main battle for the Bataan peninsula, from February to April 1942, Constabulary troops and officers fought side by side with other Philippine Commonwealth and American forces of the USAFFE, attacking and defending against Japanese troops. These battles include the Layac Line, Porac-Guagua Line, Abucay-Mauban Line, Battle of Trail 2, the Battle of the Pockets and the Battle of the Points, before the invasion at Mount Samat on 3 Apr 1942. On that date—Good Friday—Mount Samat fell. On 9 April 1942, the starving defending Fil-American forces, including the 2nd Division, surrendered to the Imperial Japanese Army on Bataan. After the enemy forces organized the surrendered troops into one large group, all Filipinos and Americans began the long walk from Mariveles, Bataan to Camp O'Donnell in Capas, Tarlac. This was the start of the Bataan Death March.

== 1942 Order of Battle ==
=== 2nd Division (PC) ===
- 1st Constabulary Regiment (PC) - Col. Mariano Castañeda Sr., PC
  - Senior Instrucor - LCol. Irwin Alexander, USA
  - HQ Battalion - Maj. Teodorico Apil
  - 1st Battalion - Capt. Jose Tando
  - 2nd Battalion - Capt. Macario Negrosa
  - 3rd Battalion - Capt. Apolinario Fajardo
- 2nd Constabulary Regiment (PC) - Col. Manuel V. Atanacio, PC
  - HQ Battalion - Maj. Daniel Alvarado
  - 1st Battalion - Capt. Jose A. Arambulo
  - 2nd Battalion - Capt. Deogracias V. Tenazas
  - 3rd Battalion - Maj. Eleuterio L. De Leon
- 4th Constabulary Regiment (PC) (Activated 29 Dec 1941) - LCol. Rafael Jalandoni, PC
  - HQ Battalion - Capt. Lino G. Ancheta
  - 1st Battalion - Maj. Manuel Turingan
  - 2nd Battalion - Capt. Godofredo Monsod
  - 3rd Battalion - Maj. Eustaquio Lomuntad
- 2nd Field Artillery Battalion - LCol. Beinvinedo Alba
  - 1st Battalion - Capt. Sixto S. Delos Santos
  - 2nd Battalion - Capt. Pedro S. Vinluan
  - 3rd Battalion - Capt. Estanislao Baltazar
  - 4th Battalion - Capt. Luis Villa-Real
- 2nd Engineer Battalion
- Headquarters, 2nd Regular Division

== Reactivation in 1945 ==
II Military District was activated in 1945 at the height of combined American, Philippine Guerilla Units, and Philippine Commonwealth Army Units. 66th Infantry, 121st Infantry, 15th Infantry, and 14th Infantry, and 122nd Field Artillery Battalion fighting in Bessang Pass came under this command. 2nd Infantry Division was activated under Colonel Russell Volckmann.

=== 2nd Infantry Division, Philippine Army during the Post-War Era ===
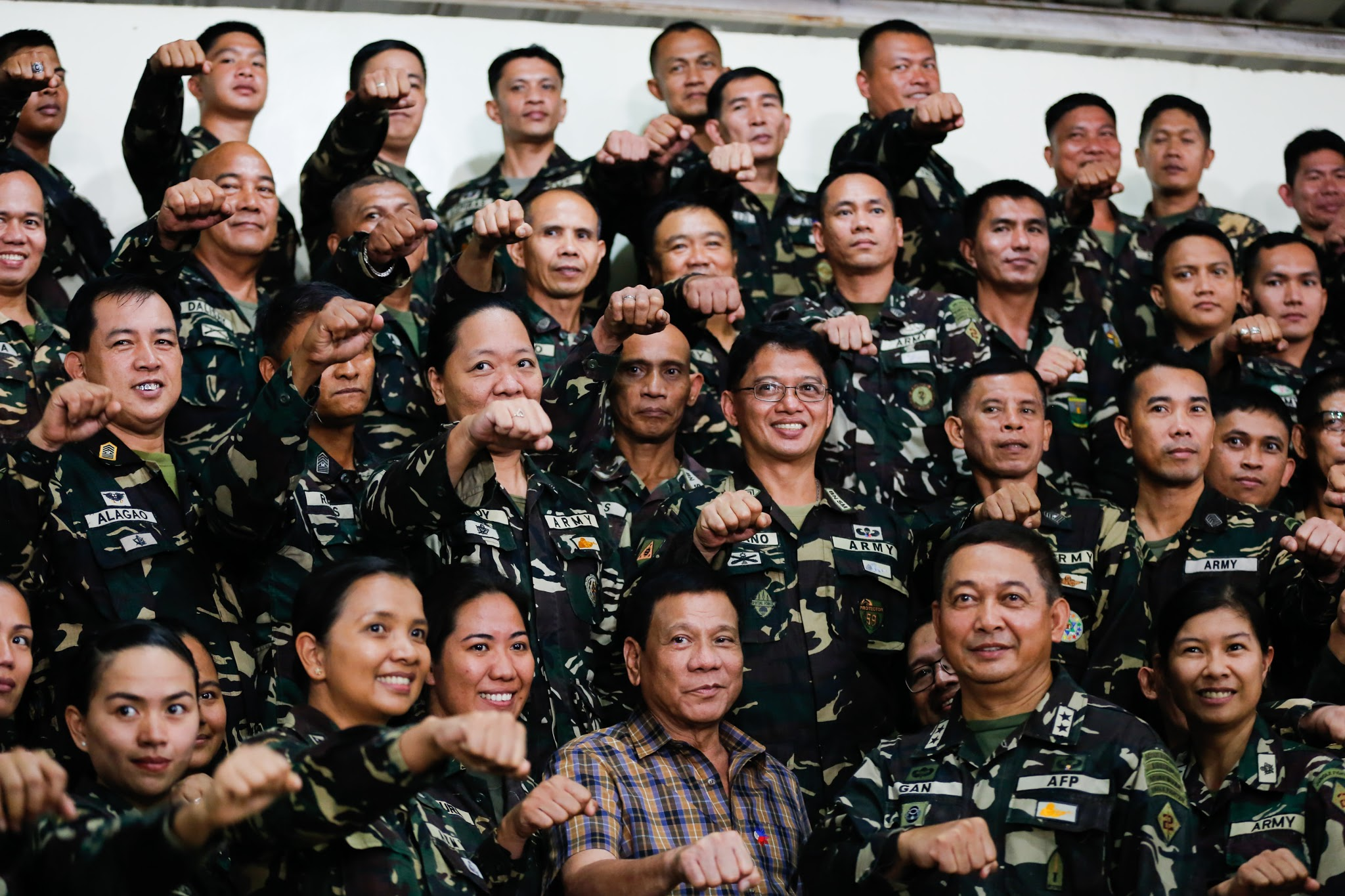
President Rodrigo Duterte with the 2nd Infantry Division army troopers at Camp Capinpin in August 2016

On 1 February 1970, the 2nd Infantry Brigade (Separate) was activated. Its first headquarters was in Camp Vicente Lim in Canlubang, Calamba City and later, was moved to Barangay Sampaloc, Tanay, Rizal. Camp Capinpin, the present camp, was named after Brigadier General Mateo M. Capinpin, the intrepid commander of the 21st Division, Philippine Army, USAFFE, who rose from the ranks during World War I. It is strategically situated 70 kilometers east of Manila at the foothills of the scenic Sierra Madre Mountains, at an elevation of 1,400 feet above sea level.

On 19 March 1976, the 2nd Infantry Brigade was upgraded and reorganized as the 2nd Infantry Division, Philippine Army, at Camp Mateo Capinpin. Since the reorganization, twenty-five successive Commanders have already led the 2nd Infantry Division.

This expansion from a brigade to a full division became necessary as brigade troops were assigned to combat the Communist rebels and local criminal element operations in Southern Luzon and beyond. These combat engagements were carried out over multiple regions and provinces, including the two regions of Calabarzon and Mimaropa, and the nine major provinces of Rizal, Cavite, Laguna, Batangas, Quezon, Occidental Mindoro, Oriental Mindoro, Marinduque and Palawan. The ongoing Communist insurgencies in the Philippines began in 1969 with the Communist rebel fighters of the New People's Army (NPA), and worsened to include the Communist Party of the Philippines (CPP), the National Democratic Front of the Philippines (NDF-P), and other local criminal elements. Battling these destructive elements, with both military and criminal aspects, hearkens back to the Constabulary roots of the 2nd Division.

In August 2016, President Rodrigo Duterte pulled out the 68th and 74th Infantry Battalion from Southern Luzon and reassigned them to Basilan in order to aid against the Abu Sayyaf Group. The pullout of the 74th Infantry Battalion left the province of Marinduque without a regular military contingent, leaving only the Citizen Armed Force Geographical Unit of the 59th Infantry Battalion to secure the province.

== 2ID Seal ==
The 2nd Infantry Division's emblem inscribes the Command's banner. It symbolizes the aspiration for peace and tranquility of the Filipino people within the Divisions area of jurisdiction.

RED-COLORED BACKGROUND – the red colored background of the diamond signifies courage and bravery.

WHITE-COLORED BAND – the white colored band running at its edge marks the unblemished reputation of the die-hard vanguard of freedom.

THREE YELLOW-COLORED STARS – represents the three major islands of the Philippines (Luzon, Visayas and Mindanao).

DIAMOND SHAPE – the diamond shape connotes the extent of the Division's areas of operation.

KRIS – superimposed over the number "2" is the "Kris", a dominant weapon, which represents the unity of the guardian of freedom and independence of the Filipino people. The silver blade implies the dignity of the people.

NUMERICAL FIGURE 2 – the Arabic numerical "2", located at the center of the diamond, distinguishes itself as the "Second-to-None Hard Hitting Division" of the Army for its combat action against internal or external enemies/threats. The blue-colored number `2` signifies patriotism.

== Mission ==
The current mission of the 2nd Infantry Division is to conduct Focused Military Operations while sustaining support to the Regional Task Force to End Local Communist Armed Conflict (RTF-ELCAC), to decisively defeat the Southern Tagalog Regional Party Committee (STRPC) armed groups and deny their manpower, financial, and logistical resources in order to bring them back to the breaking point of their collapse and eventual end of insurgency in Regions 4A and 4B (except Palawan) that will create a safe and sound environment—both physically and psychologically—conducive for development and commerce.

== Lineage of Commanding Officers ==
1. MGen. Guillermo Francisco (January 1942 - March 1942)
2. BGen. Simeon De Jesus (March 1942 - April 1942)
3. BGen. Domingo R. Tucay, PA – (1 February 1970 – 1 April 1970)
4. BGen. Teodorico R. Almuete, PA – (1 April 1970 – 16 January 1970)
5. BGen. Juan L. Razo, PA – (16 January 1970 – 18 February 1972)
6. BGen. Ramon L. Cannu, PA – (19 February 1972 – 17 September 1979)
7. BGen. Zoshimo C. Carlos, PA – (18 September 1979 – 17 January 1982)
8. BGen. Ramon L. Cannu, PA – (17 January 1982 – 16 August 1983)
9. BGen. Roland I. Pattugalan, PA – (16 August 1983 – 4 March 1986)
10. BGen. Restituto C. Padilla, PA – (5 March 1986 – 15 March 1987)
11. BGen. Alejandro A. Galido, PA – (16 March 1987 – 18 March 1988)
12. BGen. Raul T. Aquino, PA – (26 March 1988 – 16 April 1989)
13. BGen. Javier D. Carbonnel, PA – (16 April 1989 – 3 December 1989)
14. BGen. Thelmo Y. Cunanan, PA – (3 December 1989 – 24 January 1991)
15. BGen. Cesar F. Fortuno, PA – (26 January 1991 – 25 March 1992)
16. BGen. Regino J. Lacson, PA – (22 March 1992 – 23 February 1995)
17. BGen. Romeo D. Lopez, PA – (23 February 1995 – 16 August 1996)
18. BGen. Samuel T. Dungque, PA – (16 August 1996 – 8 October 1997)
19. BGen. Rolando C. Bautista, PA – (9 October 1997 – 12 January 1998)
20. MGen. Jose S. Lachica, PA – (12 January 1998 – 1 March 2000)
21. MGen. Roberto P. Santiago, PA – (6 March 2000 – 8 March 2001)
22. MGen. Jacinto C. Ligot, PA – (28 March 2001 – 6 May 2002)
23. MGen. Efren L. Abu, PA – (6 May 2002 – 30 July 2003)
24. MGen. Gabriel M. Ledesma, PA – (30 July 2003 – 21 January 2004)
25. MGen. Pedro R. Cabuay Jr., PA – ( 21 January 2004 – 21 November 2004)
26. MGen. Alexander B. Yano, PA – (20 January 2006 – 3 August 2006)
27. MGen. Fernando L. Mesa, PA – (3 August 2006 – 11 September 2007)
28. MGen. Delfin N. Bangit, PA – (11 September 2007 – 8 May 2008)
29. MGen. Roland M. Detabali, PA – (8 May 2008 – 2 June 2009)
30. BGen. Florante B. Martinez, PA – (2 June 2009 – 23 July 2009)
31. MGen. Jorge V. Segovia, PA – (23 July 2009 – 30 July 2010)
32. MGen. Jessie D. Dellosa, PA – (30 July 2010 – 22 July 2011)
33. BGen. Nestor A. Annonuevo, PA – (22 July 2011 – 23 August 2011)
34. MGen. Romulo M. Bambao, PA – (23 August 2011 – 21 January 2012)
35. MGen. Eduardo D. Del Rosario, PA – (21 January 2012 – 22 November 2012)
36. MGen. Nonato Alfredo T. Peralta Jr., PA – (22 November 2012 – 25 November 2013)
37. MGen. Rodelio V. Santos, PA – (25 November 2013 – 3 February 2015)
38. MGen. Romeo G. Gan, PA – (3 February 2015 – 10 November 2016)
39. MGen. Rhoderick M. Parayno, PA – (10 November 2016 – 3 May 2019)
40. BGen. Elias H. Escarcha, PA – (3 May 2019 – 12 July 2019) (acting)
41. MGen. Arnulfo Marcelo B. Burgos Jr., PA – (12 July 19 – 8 September 2020)
42. MGen. Greg T. Almerol, PA – (11 September 2020 – 12 March 2021)
43. MGen. Bartolome Vicente O. Bacarro, PA (21 April 2021 – 27 July 2021)
44. MGen. Rowen S. Tolentino, PA – (27 July 2021 – 12 August 2022)
45. BGen. Rommel K. Tello, PA – (12 August 2022 – 20 October 2022) (acting)
46. MGen. Roberto S. Capulong, PA – (20 October 2022 – Present)
47. MGen. Cerilo Balaoro Jr., PA- (18 September 2024 – Present)

== Current Units ==
The following are the Brigade units that are under the 2nd Infantry Division.

- 201st Infantry (Kabalikat) Brigade
- 202nd Infantry (Unifier) Brigade
- 203rd Infantry (Bantáy Kapayapaan) Brigade

The following are the Battalion units that are under the 2nd Infantry Division

- 1st Infantry (Always First) Battalion
- 2nd CMO Battalion/Task Force Ugnay
- 4th Infantry (Scorpion) Battalion
- 16th Infantry (Maglilingkód) Battalion
- 59th Infantry (Protector) Battalion
- 68th Infantry (Kaagapay) Battalion
- 74th Infantry (Unbeatable) Battalion
- 76th Infantry (Victrix) Battalion
- 80th Infantry (Steadfast) Battalion
- 85th Infantry (Sandiwà) Battalion
- 92nd Infantry (Tanglaw Diwa) Battalion

== Operations ==
- The engagements of the military operations against the Imperial Japanese Armed Forces from January 3, 1942, to September 2, 1945, during World War II under the Japanese Occupation.
- Anti-guerrilla operations against the New People's Army.
- Anti-terrorist operations against the Abu Sayyaf operating in their AOR.
- The 2nd Infantry Division was among the forerunners of what is now the 1st Scout Ranger Regiment.
- MGen Delfin Bangit was previously assigned as the Presidents Most Senior Aide-de-camp and is the commanding officer of the Presidential Security Group.
- MGen Pedro Cabouay was former commander of the Intelligence Service AFP and Light Armor Brigade (now Armor "Pambato" Division) was an alumnus of the University of Santo Tomas College of Commerce and is a product of the Philippine ROTC System.
- LtGen Alexander Yano, former commander of the 2ID, was previously assigned as Commanding General of the Philippine Army and later on as Chief of Staff of the Armed Forces of the Philippines.
- MGen Fernando Mesa is currently serving as the AFP NCR Command's commanding general. Overseeing security measures for the National Capital Region and is also responsible in securing the seat of power of the Philippine Government.
