= Cirilito Sobejana =

Filipino Army General (born 1965)

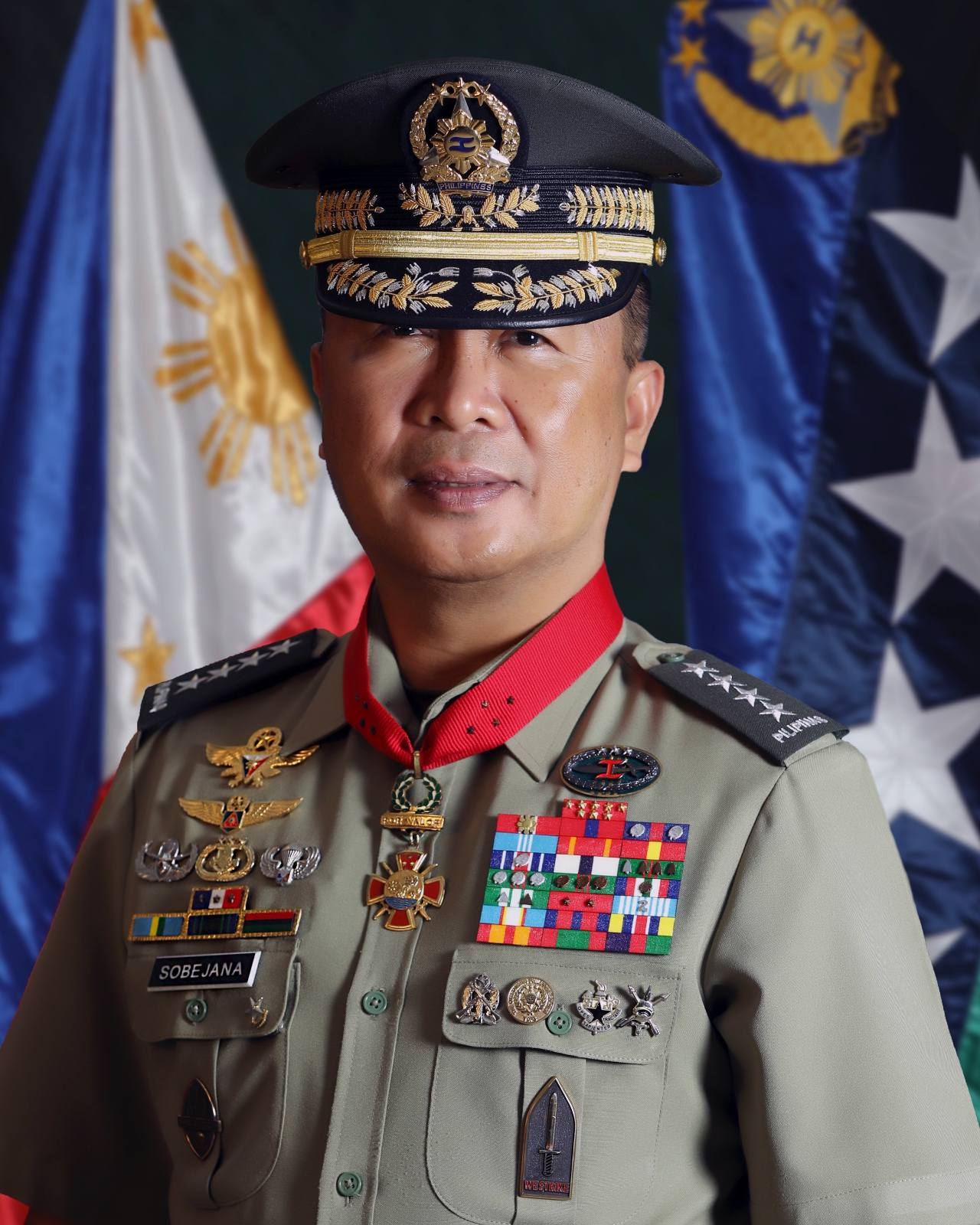
- 55th Chief of Staff of the Armed Forces of the Philippines
- Born: Cirilito Elola Sobejana; July 31, 1965 (age 61); Zamboanguita, Negros Oriental, Philippines
- Allegiance: Philippines
- Branch: Philippine Army
- Service years: 1987–2021
- Rank: General
- Commands: Chief of Staff of the Armed Forces of the Philippines; Commanding General of the Philippine Army; Western Mindanao Command; 6th Infantry Division; Joint Task Force Sulu; 601st Infantry Brigade; 3rd Scout Ranger Battalion, FSSR; 1st Scout Ranger Company, FSRR
- Awards: Medal of Valor; Philippine Legion of Honor
- Education: Philippine Military Academy (BS)
- Spouse: Edna Iturriaga
- Children: 5

Cirilito Elola Sobejana (born July 31, 1965) is a retired Philippine Army general who served as the 55th Chief of Staff of the Armed Forces of the Philippines under President Rodrigo Duterte. He is also known for having been awarded the Armed Forces of the Philippines Medal of Valor in 1995 for his valiant actions in Basilan against the extremist guerrilla group Abu Sayyaf.

Sobejana was also appointed the Commanding General of the Philippine Army from August 2020 to February 2021. Prior to that, he served as commander of the Western Mindanao Command from June 2019 to August 2020, of the 6th Infantry Division in 2018, and of the Joint Task Force Sulu in 2017.

== Education ==
Sobejana graduated from the Philippine Military Academy as part of the Hinirang Class of 1987. He finished his Command and General Staff Course at the Armed Forces of the Philippines Command and General Staff College and underwent the Executive Course on National Security Administration at the National Defense College of the Philippines. The general underwent the Scout Ranger Regiment Course and was a qualified member of the Special Forces. He has also trained as a paratrooper and a scuba diver.

Internationally, Sobejana trained in chemical, biological, radiological and nuclear defense (CBRN defense) in Sweden and in operations research systems analysis at the US Army Logistics Management College in the United States. He also completed the Advance Security Cooperation course at Asia-Pacific Center for Security Studies in Honolulu, Hawaii.

== Military career ==
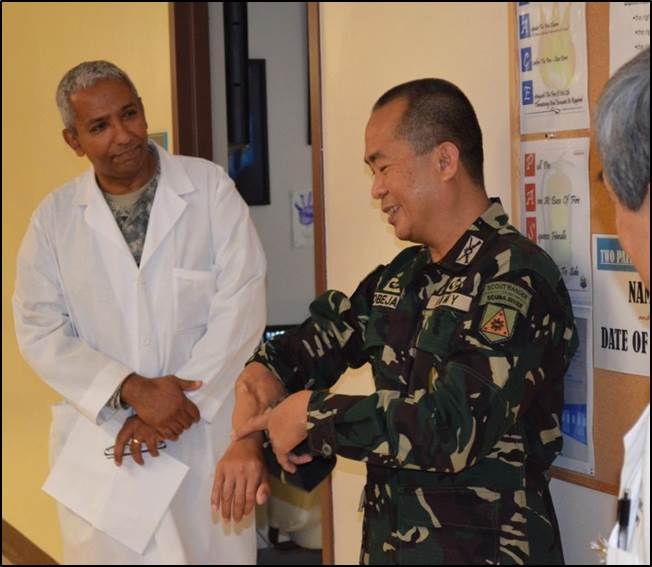
Then-Colonel Sobejana points at his reconstructed right arm while visiting Tripler Army Medical Center in 2015

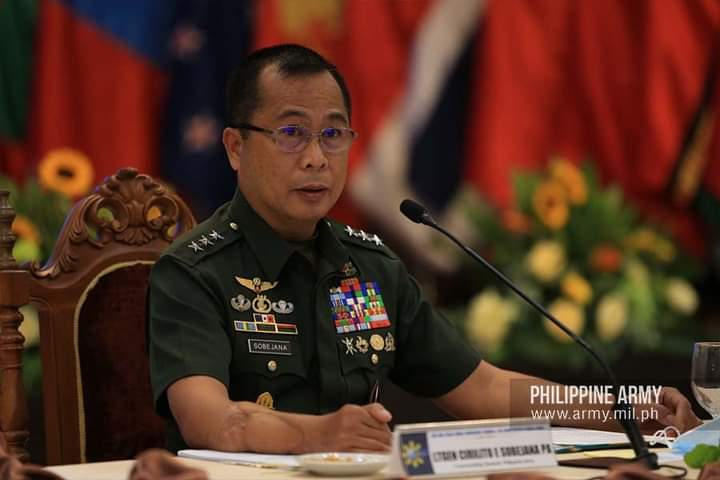
Lieutenant General Sobejana speaking at the 44th Indo-Pacific Armies Management Seminar (IPAMS) Virtual Conference

Sobejana undertook various positions throughout his military career including Commandant of the Scout Ranger School and Commander of the Civil-Military Operations Group, Deputy Operations and Training Officer of the 1st Scout Ranger Regiment, Head of the Plans, Policies and Materiel Development Division of the Army Support Command, Chief of the Firepower Division at the Office of the Deputy Chief of Staff for Logistics J4, Executive Officer of the Army Resource Management Office, and Deputy Chief to the Assistant Chief of Staff for Civil-Military Operations G7. From 2003 to 2004, he was deployed to the United Nations Mission in East Timor as a military observer.

Rising through the ranks, Sobejana eventually served as commander of the 602nd Infantry Brigade, the Joint Task Force Sulu, the 6th Infantry Division, and then the Western Mindanao Command.

Under his leadership, his units earned recognition: the 1st Scout Ranger Company was named Best Company in 1994, the 3rd Scout Ranger Battalion the Best Battalion in 2009, the 601st Infantry Brigade the Best Brigade in 2016, and 6th Infantry Division the Best Division in 2018. He attributes the successes of his troops to his personal mantra "Ang taong masaya [ay] maraming magagawa (A happy man does many things)."

=== Western Mindanao Command ===
As commander of the Western Mindanao Command, Sobejana notably led the search and rescue operations of British businessman Allan Hyrons and his Filipino wife, Wilma in October 2019. The couple was abducted by the Abu Sayyaf in Zamboanga del Sur and was rescued in November of that year in Sulu. British special forces provided support during the operation.

Sobejana was accorded the rank of Pinuno (Officer) of the Philippine Legion of Honor for his leadership and meritorious conduct and service. The Bangsamoro Transition Authority Parliament also commended the general for his overwhelming support in the peace process and overall peace developments in the Bangsamoro Region

=== Commanding General of the Philippine Army ===
On August 4, 2020, Sobejana was appointed Commanding General of the Philippine Army by President Rodrigo Duterte. He took over from then Lieutenant General Gilbert Gapay, as the later was promoted to Chief of Staff of the Armed Forces of the Philippines.

=== Chief of Staff of the Armed Forces of the Philippines ===
On January 27, 2021, Sobejana again succeeded General Gilbert Gapay as Chief of Staff of the Armed Forces of the Philippines. His concurrent promotion to General was confirmed by the Commission on Appointments on March 24, 2021.

As chief of staff, Sobejana vowed to modernize the Armed Forces of the Philippines, secure the country's interests, and protect the country's sovereignty of its claimed features in the South China Sea (portions of which are designated as "West Philippine Sea") amidst the heightened tensions in the area. The deployment of three Type 22 missile boats near the Second Thomas Shoal in April 2021 by Chinese forces was met with the deployment of Philippine military assets by the general, particularly ships and aircraft, along with the Philippine Coast Guard and Bureau of Fisheries and Aquatic Resources, to the South China Sea. He protested against the proposed Coast Guard Law from China, enabling them to open fire on any ship that enter the disputed waters.

In March 2021, the attention of General Sobejana was called by the Commission on Appointments regarding the questionable appointment of then Lieutenant General Jose Faustino Jr as Acting Commanding General of the Philippine Army. Senator Panfilo Lacson cited Section 4 of Republic Act No. 8186 to challenge the appointment, even in an acting capacity. Upholding the precedence of the law, General Sobejana relieved Lieutenant General Faustino from his post.

Sobejana retired from military service in July 2021. He was succeeded in his post as chief of staff by Lieutenant General Jose Faustino Jr.

== Awards and decorations ==
=== Armed Forces of the Philippines Medal of Valor ===
In 1995, then Captain Sobejana led his platoon in engaging a group of 20 Abu Sayyaf guerrillas in Isabela, Basilan. Abu Sayyaf reinforcements arrived until Sobejana's unit was facing approximately 150 combatants. After two hours spent trading fire, Sobejana sustained two bullet wounds to his right forearm and a third bullet wrecked his rifle. His arm was almost severed and he had to bite his right thumb to keep the arm from falling off. Sobejana then began to fire using his left hand while still directing his men. The firefight ended after four hours with Sobejana being wounded thrice more.

Sobejana refused to have his arm amputated and underwent several surgical procedures in the United States. He underwent initial surgery at Tripler Army Medical Center in Hawaii and would ultimately spend 10 months there undergoing further operations and reconstructive surgery. He was transferred to Brooke Army Medical Center in Texas for rehabilitation. He eventually recovered the partial use of his right hand and arm and remained in active service. For his valiant actions, he was conferred the Armed Forces of the Philippines Medal of Valor by President Fidel Ramos in 1996.

==== Medal of Valor citation ====
CAPTAIN CIRILITO E SOBEJANA O-9786 PA
Isabela, Basilan – 13 January 1995

"For conspicuous gallantry and intrepidity at the risk of life above and beyond the call of duty during an encounter with about 150 Abu Sayyaf kidnap gang members at Sitio Caro, Barangay Lower Kapayawan, Isabela Basilan on 13 January 1995, while serving as Commanding Officer of the 1st Scout Ranger Company, First Scout Ranger Regiment, Philippine Army.

When Task Group Panther received reports on the enemy concentration, it immediately dispatched one platoon under CAPTAIN SOBEJANA to check the area. While observing the reported location of enemy presence, he sighted about 20 armed enemies loitering near a cluster of houses. After assessing the situation, he directed his men to attack the enemy position which resulted to an ensuing fierce fire fight. Alerted by the incident, several Abu Sayyaf groups from nearby areas arrived to reinforce their comrades, cutting the troops from the supporting section. As the firefight raged, firepower and numerical superiority of the enemy became apparent as members of the First Scout Ranger Company incurred casualties.

After two hours of continuous fire fight, CAPTAIN SOBEJANA was hit in the lower arm as he went for the radio of a fallen soldier. Bravely holding his ground, he sustained a second bullet wound that almost severed his right arm. Still, he controlled all fire directions to best defend their position and repulse the encircling enemy. Though in pain and with a shattered rifle after it was hit by an enemy fire, he never lost composure and continued leading his men. He even maneuvered around, exposing himself to enemy fire to direct the encounter. After almost four hours of intense fighting, reinforcements from the Task Group Panther and the 4th Scout Ranger Company arrived to secure the area and evacuate the wounded. Report placed the enemy casualties at 30 killed and unconfirmed number of wounded.

By this gallantry, CAPTAIN SOBEJANA distinguished himself in combat, in keeping with the finest traditions of the Filipino soldiery."

Aside from the Medal of Valor, Sobejana is the recipient of the Distinguished Conduct Star, eleven Distinguished Service Stars, the Gold Cross, three Bronze Cross Medals, the Wounded Personnel Medal, thirty three Military Merit Medals, and seven Commendation Medals. He was recognized as an Outstanding Philippine Soldier in the Combat Category in 1995. He received the Award of Excellence for Public Service and the Plaque of Commendation from Roel Degamo, the Governor of Negros Oriental, the general's home province, in 2012 and in 2021 respectively.

Left Side:

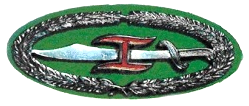

| Badges | Combat Commander's Badge | | |
| 1st row | | Medal of Valor | |
| 2nd row | Chief Commander, Philippine Legion of Honor | Officer, Philippine Legion of Honor | 1 Distinguished Conduct Star |
| 3rd row | 11 Distinguished Service Stars with two bronze anahaw clusters | 1 Gold Cross Medal | 1 Meritorious Achievement Medal |
| 4th row | 1 Distinguished Service Medal | 2 Chief of Staff of the AFP Commendation Medal | 1 Gawad sa Kaunlaran |
| 5th row | 3 Bronze Cross Medals | 1 Wounded Personnel Medal | Military Merit Medals with four spearhead devices (33 total medals) |
| 6th row | Military Merit Medals with four silver and one bronze anahaws (33 total medals) | 2 Military Civic Action Medals with one bronze anahaw | 1st Parangal sa Kapanalig ng Sandatahang Lakas ng Pilipinas Medal |
| 7th row | 2nd Parangal sa Kapanalig ng Sandatahang Lakas ng Pilipinas Medal | 7 Military Commendation Medals with one silver and one bronze triangular devices | United Nations Service Medal |
| 8th row | UN Mission in East Timor Medal with Numeral 2 Device | Disengagement Observer Force Medal | 3 Long Service Medal with two campaign stars |
| 9th row | 4 Anti-dissidence Campaign Medal with three campaign stars | 4 Luzon Anti-Dissidence Campaign Medal with three campaign stars | 4 Visayas Anti-Dissidence Campaign Medal with three campaign stars |
| 10th row | 5 Mindanao Anti-Dissidence Campaign Medal with four campaign stars | Jolo and Sulu Anti-Dissidence Campaign Medal | Disaster Relief and Rehabilitation Operations Ribbon |

Right Side:

| 1st row | | Philippine Republic Presidential Unit Citation | |
| 2nd row | People Power I Unit Citation | People Power II Unit Citation | Martial Law Unit Citation |

Badges and other awards:

- Armed Forces of the Philippines Parachutist Badge
- Special Forces Qualification Badge
- Combat Commander's Badge
- Scout Ranger Qualification Badge
- Philippine Air Force Gold Wings Badge
- Army Aviation Badge
- The Outstanding Philippine Soldier from the Rotary Club Makati (1995)
- Philippine Military Academy Cavalier Award (1997)
- Award for Continuing Excellence and Service by the Metrobank Foundation (2019)
- Award of Excellence for Public Service of the Governor of Negros Oriental (2012)
- Plaque of Commendation from the Governor of Negros Oriental (2021)

== Personal life ==
Sobejana is married to Edna Iturriaga Sobejana. Together, they have five children, Mae Suzanne, Mae Suzzette, Sheena Joy, Sean Jason, and Siegfried Joshua.

Post his retirement from military service, the general returned to his hometown in Zamboanguita, Negros Oriental.

Military offices
| Preceded by Lt. Gen. Gilbert Gapay | Commanding General of the Philippine Army; August 4, 2020–February 4, 2021 | Succeeded by Lt. Gen. Jose Faustino Jr. as Acting Commanding General |
| Preceded by Gen. Gilbert Gapay | Chief of Staff of the Armed Forces of the Philippines; February 4, 2021–July 31, 2021 | Succeeded by Gen. Jose Faustino Jr. |
