= Jose Faustino Jr. =

Chief of Staff of the Armed Forces of the Philippines

General Jose Faustino PA
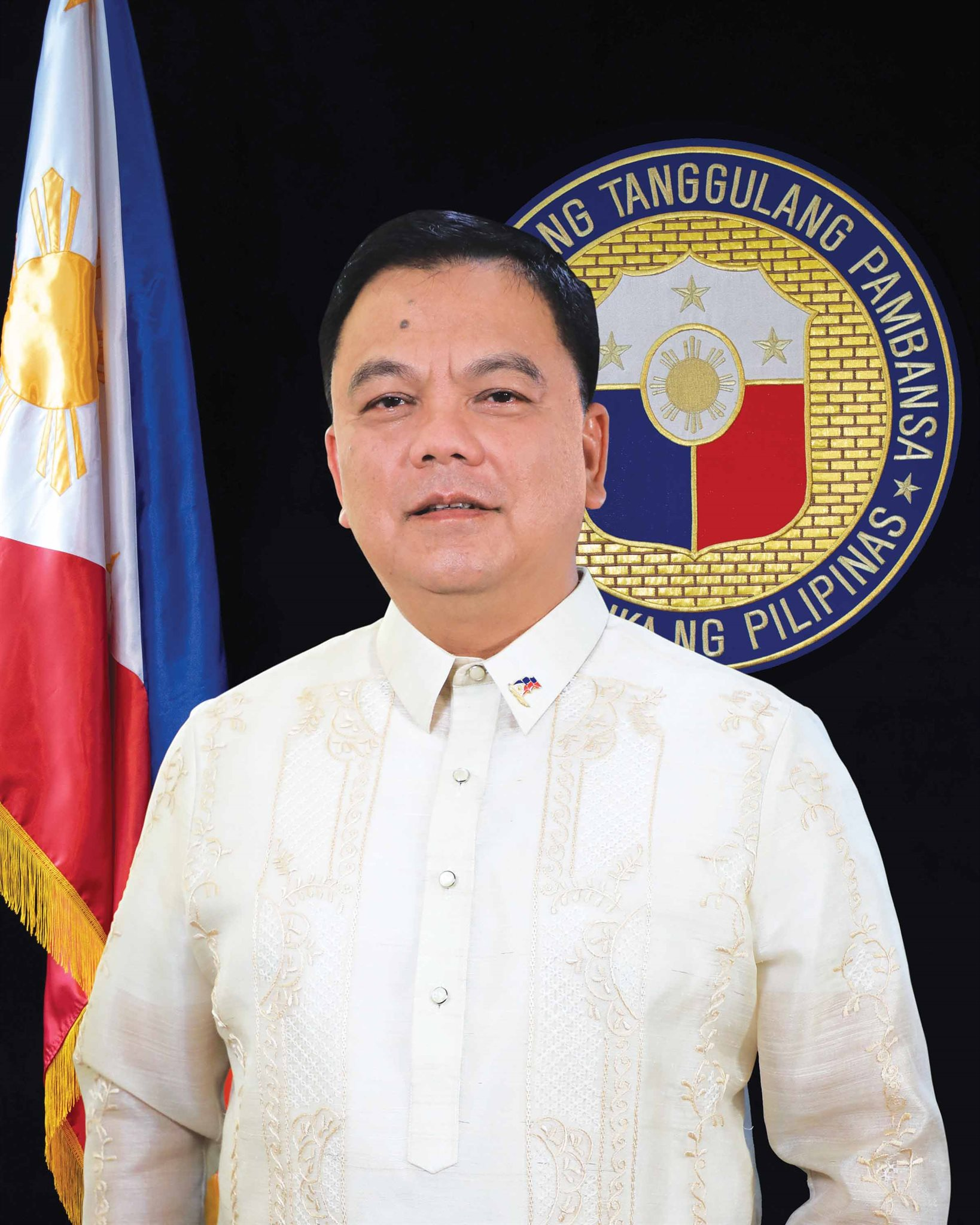

Senior Undersecretary of the Department of National Defense
- In office June 30, 2022 (Note: To assume role as regular Secretary on November 13, 2022) – January 9, 2023
- President: Bongbong Marcos
- Preceded by: Cardozo Luna
- Succeeded by: Carlito Galvez Jr.

Secretary of National Defense
- Officer-in-Charge
- In office June 30, 2022 – January 9, 2023
- President: Bongbong Marcos
- Preceded by: Delfin Lorenzana
- Succeeded by: Carlito Galvez Jr.

Chairman of the National Task Force Against COVID-19
- In office June 30, 2022 – January 9, 2023
- President: Bongbong Marcos
- Preceded by: Delfin Lorenzana
- Succeeded by: Carlito Galvez Jr.

56th Chief of Staff of the Armed Forces of the Philippines
- In office July 31, 2021 – November 12, 2021
- President: Rodrigo Duterte
- Preceded by: Cirilito Sobejana
- Succeeded by: Andres Centino

Acting Commanding General of the Philippine Army
- In office February 16, 2021 – May 14, 2021
- President: Rodrigo Duterte
- Preceded by: Cirilito Sobejana
- Succeeded by: Andres Centino

Personal details
- Born: November 12, 1965 (age 60) Itogon, Benguet, Philippines
- Education: Philippine Military Academy (B.S.)

Military service
- Allegiance: Philippines
- Branch: Philippine Army
- Service years: 1988–2021
- Rank: General
- Commands: Joint Task Force Mindanao; Eastern Mindanao Command; 10th Infantry Division; 501st Infantry Brigade; 35th Infantry Battalion

Jose Calingasan Faustino Jr. (born November 12, 1965) is a retired Philippine Army general who previously served as Senior Undersecretary and officer-in-charge of the Department of National Defense.

He previously served as the 56th Chief of Staff of the Armed Forces of the Philippines from July to November 2021 and was controversially designated the Acting Commanding General of the Philippine Army from February to May 2021 during the presidency of Rodrigo Duterte.

== Early life and education ==
Faustino was born on November 12, 1965, in Itogon, Benguet, and grew up in Malolos, Bulacan. He is the son of retired Philippine Army colonel, Jose Faustino Sr. Faustino entered the Philippine Military Academy in 1983 and graduated as part of the Maringal Class of 1988.

After graduation, he undertook various military, leadership and staff courses both locally and abroad. He ranked 2nd of his class in the Scout Ranger Course and serves as a qualified member of the 1st Scout Ranger Regiment and the Special Forces. He also finished at the top of his class in the Infantry Officer Basic and Advanced Infantry Officer courses at the National Defense College of the Philippines. Faustino completed the Command and General Staff Course at the Republic of Korea Army College and the United Nations Integrated Mission Staff Officers Course in Canada.

== Military career ==
Faustino served in various special forces, infantry, intelligence, and staff positions. As lieutenant, he was assigned to the 1st Scout Ranger Regiment, and served as commander of the 7th Scout Ranger Company in 1992. He served as an intelligence and operations officer in the 1st Scout Ranger Regiment, the Assistant Chief of Staff for Comptrollership of the Intelligence and Security Group, the Assistant Chief of Staff for Intelligence of 10th Infantry Division, the Deputy G2 of the Philippine Army, the Assistant Chief of Unified Command Staff for Intelligence of the National Capital Region Command, and the Assistant Chief of Staff for Education and Training of the Philippine Army.

Faustino also undertook various academic posts at his alma-mater, the Philippine Military Academy, where he was named as the Administration and Tactical Officer of the Headquarters Tactics Group, as the Head of Tactics Group, and as the Commandant of Cadets. He served as the Commandant of Scout Ranger Training School of Camp Tecson in San Miguel, Bulacan, and as the commander of the 11th Intelligence Service Unit, under the Intelligence and Security Group. Faustino assumed command of the 35th Infantry Battalion and then of the 501st Infantry Brigade.

Faustino also served as the Chief of Staff of the Philippine Army, and became commander of the 10th Infantry Division. Under his leadership from December 2018 to January 2020, the 10th Infantry Division launched military operations against the New People's Army, and dismantled Pulang Bagani commands and guerrilla fronts within the division's jurisdiction. In January 2020, he was named commander of the Eastern Mindanao Command, and served in this position until February 2021. He led the area's implementation of the Executive Order 70 continuing to instigate military operations against the New People's Army, while creating a nation-building approach in order to achieve long-lasting peace in the country and promoting community-building programs.

=== Acting Commanding General of the Philippine Army ===
In February 2021, Faustino was designated Acting Commanding General of the Philippine Army, upon the promotion of then Lieutenant General Cirilito Sobejana to Chief of Staff of the Armed Forces of the Philippines.

He aimed to continue the modernization and reorganization programs of his predecessors, but his appointment even in an acting capacity was questioned by the Commission on Appointments, particularly by Senator Panfilo Lacson. During a confirmation hearing, Senator Lacson, citing Section 4 of the Republic Act No. 8186, read "no officer shall be assigned or designated to certain key positions including the Commanding General of the Philippine Army if he has less than one year of active service remaining prior to compulsory retirement at the age of 56." Shortly after, Faustino was removed from office and only served as acting commanding general for 87 days.

=== Joint Task Force Mindanao ===
After the retraction of his previous appointment, Faustino was named Special Assistant to the Chief of Staff on Peace and Development, but in June 2021, was named the inaugural commander of a newly formed working group, Joint Task Force Mindanao, intended to oversee the Western and Eastern Commands' military operations. He spearheaded the creation of the Mindanao Security and Stability Plan, boosting the military's peace efforts through former rebels assistance, livelihood, and regional development programs. Upon Faustino's promotion, no new commander has been named since and the joint task force was dissolved.

=== Chief of Staff of the Armed Forces of the Philippines ===
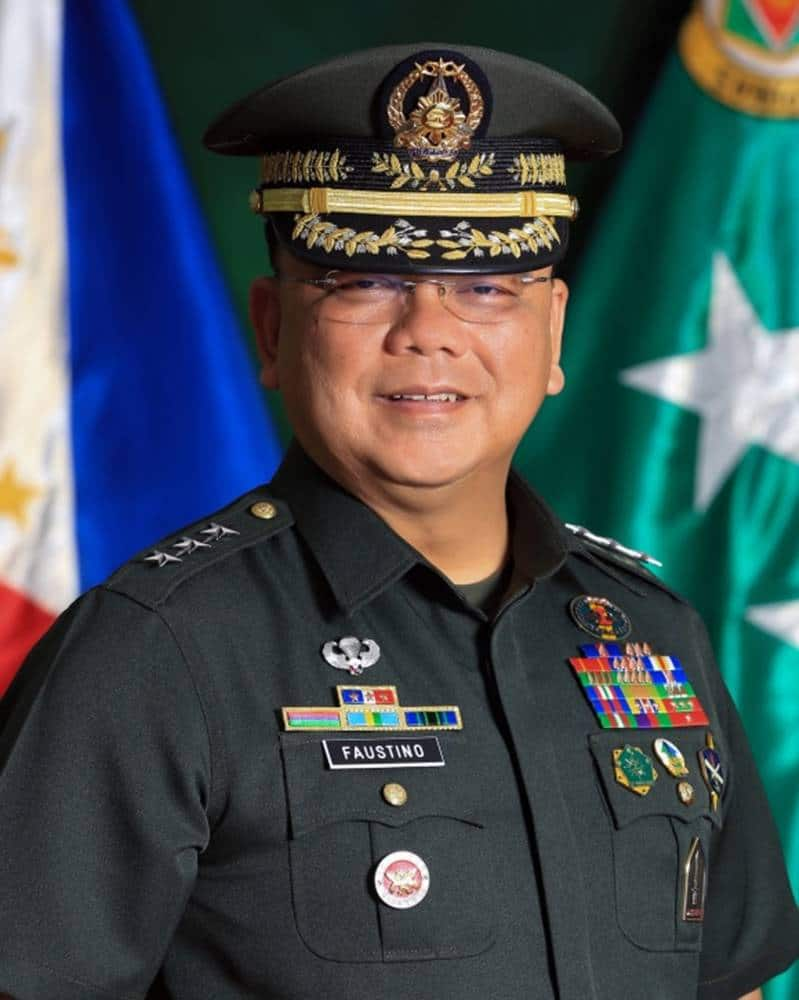
Portrait of Lt. Gen. Faustino during his time as Chief of Staff of the Armed Forces of the Philippines

In July 2021, Faustino was appointed as the 56th Chief of Staff of the Armed Forces of the Philippines by President Rodrigo Duterte, again succeeding General Cirilito Sobejana. As chief, he proposed the creation of the Center for Preventing and Countering Violent Extremism, which would aim to further assist the armed forces' study on extremism and terrorism, and craft measures to prevent their ideologies from spreading throughout the country and the region. His appointment and concurring promotion to the rank of general was approved by the Commission on Appointments in September 2021. Faustino retired from military service in November 2021 in compliance to the mandatory retirement at the age of 56.

== Secretary of National Defense (2022–2023) ==
=== Appointment ===
In June 2022, President Bongbong Marcos named Faustino Senior Undersecretary of the Department of National Defense. Republic Act No. 11709, Section 18 bans the appointment of a retired military officer as Secretary of National Defense within one year from the date of their retirement. The retired general is expected to assume the position of secretary in November 2022, pending confirmation from the Commission on Appointments. In the absence of a secretary, Senior Undersecretary Faustino is designated as officer-in-charge of the Department of National Defense.

== Awards from military service ==
Faustino has received the following awards:

Left Side

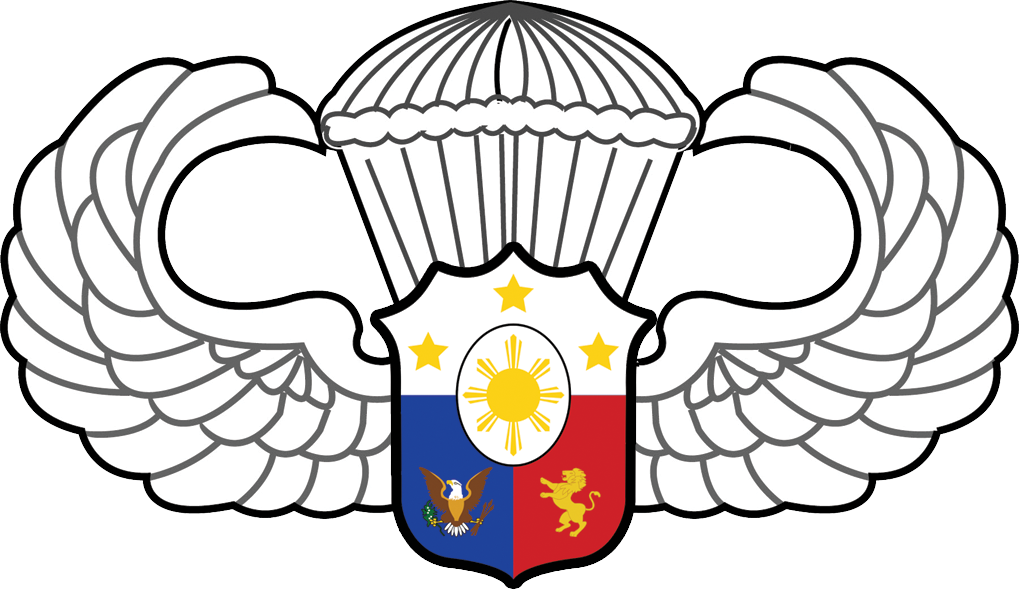
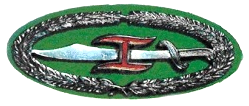

Badges	AFP Parachutist Badge		
Badges	Combat Commander's Badge		
1st row	Chief Commander; Philippine Legion of Honor	4 Distinguished Service Star Medals	
2nd row	2 Silver Cross Medals	2 Meritorious Achievement Medals	2 Chief of Staff of the Armed Forces of the Philippines Commendation Medals
3rd row	1 Distinguished Service Medal	1 Gawad sa Kaunlaran	1 Silver Wing Medal
4th row	Military Merit Medals with four spearhead devices	Military Merit Medals with four bronze anahaw devices	1 Sagisag ng Ulirang Kawal
5th row	4 Military Civic Action Medals	1 Parangal sa Kapanalig ng Sandatahang Lakas ng Pilipinas Medal	7 Military Commendation Medals with one silver and two bronze triangle devices
6th row	2 Long Service Medal with one campaign star	1 Anti-dissidence Campaign Medal	2 Luzon Anti-Dissidence Campaign Medal with three campaign star
7th row	3 Mindanao Anti-Dissidence Campaign Medal with three campaign star	1 Jolo and Sulu Campaign Medal	Disaster Relief and Rehabilitation; Operations Ribbon
Badges	-	-	-
Badge	Scout Ranger Qualification Badge		

Right Side

1st row		Philippine Republic Presidential Unit Citation	
2nd row	People Power I Unit Citation	People Power II Unit Citation	Martial Law Unit Citation

Badges and Other Awards:

- Scout Ranger Qualification Badge
- Presidential Security Group Badge
- Special Forces Qualification Badge
- Army Aviation Badge

== Personal life ==
Faustino's nickname by his peers is Boy. With his wife Joy, he has one daughter.

== Notes ==
Military offices
Preceded by Gen. Cirilito Sobejana	Acting Commanding General of the Philippine Army; February 16, 2021 – May 14, 2021	Succeeded by Lt. Gen. Andres Centino
Preceded by Gen. Cirilito Sobejana	Chief of Staff of the Armed Forces of the Philippines; July 31, 2021 – November 12, 2021	Succeeded by Lt. Gen. Andres Centino
Political offices
Preceded by Cardozo Luna	Undersecretary of National Defense; 2022–2023	Succeeded by Carlito Galvez Jr.
Preceded by Delfin Lorenzana	Secretary of National Defense (Officer–in–Charge); 2022–2023	Succeeded by Carlito Galvez Jr.
