= Carlito Galvez Jr. =

Chief of Staff of the Philippine Armed Forces

Retired General Carlito G. Galvez Jr. PA
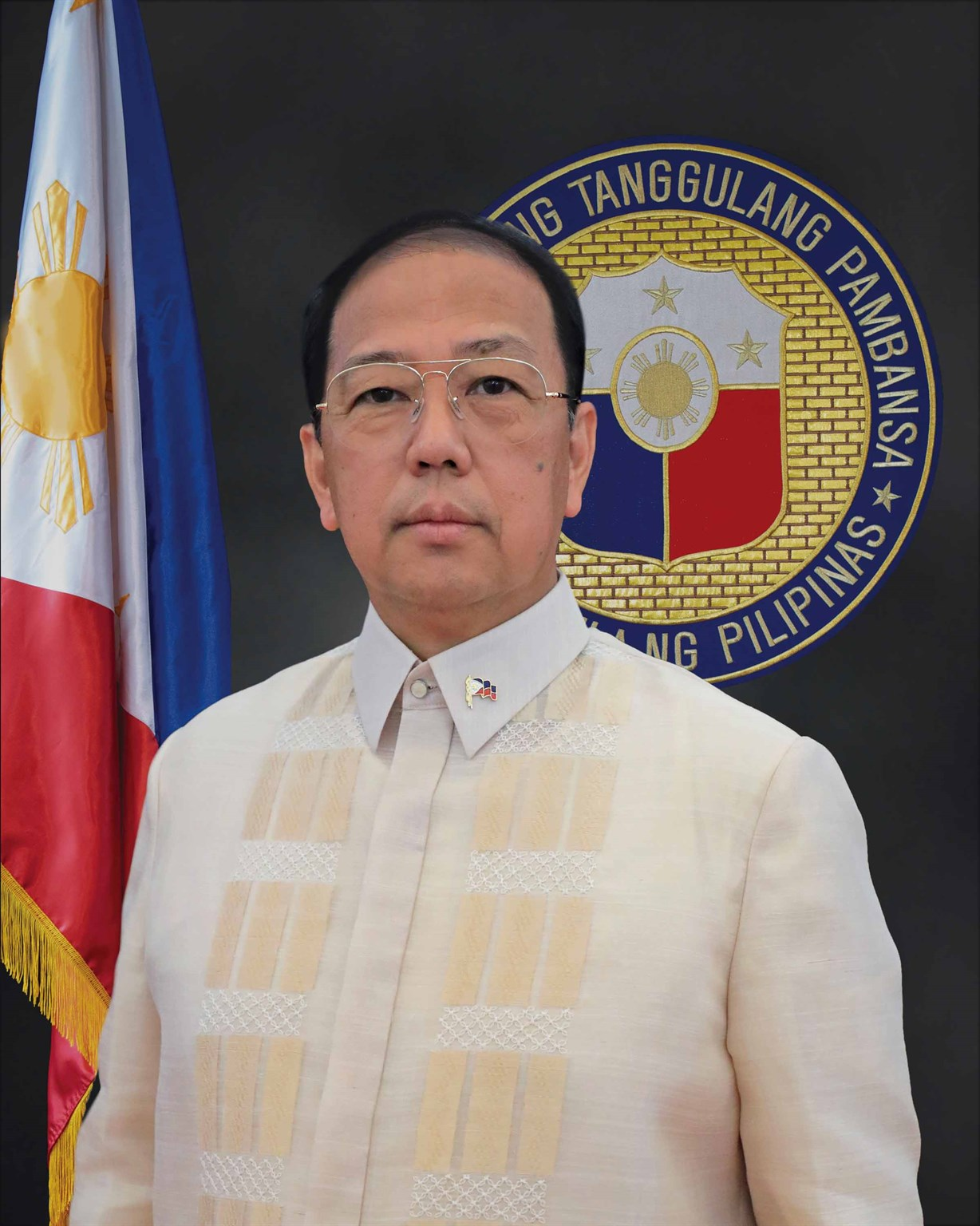
- Galvez in 2023

Presidential Adviser on Peace, Reconciliation and Unity
- In office June 26, 2023 – April 21, 2026
- President: Bongbong Marcos
- Preceded by: Usec. Isidro L. Purisima (Acting)
- Succeeded by: Mel Senen Sarmiento
- In office December 12, 2018 – January 9, 2023
- President: Rodrigo Duterte; Bongbong Marcos
- Preceded by: Jesus Dureza
- Succeeded by: Usec. Isidro L. Purisima (Acting)

Secretary of National Defense
- Officer in Charge
- In office January 9, 2023 – June 5, 2023
- President: Bongbong Marcos
- Preceded by: Usec. Jose Faustino Jr. (OIC)
- Succeeded by: Gilberto Teodoro Jr.

Senior Undersecretary of National Defense
- In office January 9, 2023 – June 26, 2023
- President: Bongbong Marcos
- Preceded by: Jose Faustino Jr.
- Succeeded by: Angelito M. De Leon (Acting)

IATF-EID Vaccine Czar
- In office November 2, 2020 – June 30, 2022
- President: Rodrigo Duterte
- Preceded by: Position established
- Succeeded by: Position abolished

Chief Implementer of the National Task Force against COVID-19
- In office March 16, 2020 – June 30, 2022
- President: Rodrigo Duterte
- Preceded by: Position established
- Succeeded by: Position abolished

50th Chief of Staff of the Armed Forces of the Philippines
- In office April 18, 2018 – December 11, 2018
- President: Rodrigo Duterte
- Preceded by: Gen. Rey Leonardo Guerrero
- Succeeded by: Gen. Benjamin Madrigal Jr.

Personal details
- Born: Carlito Guancing Galvez Jr. December 12, 1962 (age 63) Bustos, Bulacan, Philippines
- Education: Philippine Military Academy; University of New South Wales (M.PM)
- Nickname: Charlie

Military service
- Allegiance: Philippines
- Branch/service: Philippine Army
- Years of service: 1985–2018
- Rank: General
- Unit: Chief of Staff of the Armed Forces of the Philippines; AFP Western Mindanao Command; 6th Infantry Division; Chairman, Government of the Philippines Coordinating Committees on the Cessation of Hostilities (GPH-CCCH); Deputy Chief of Staff for Operations, Organization & Training, J3; 104th Brigade, 1 ID; Task Group Panther Bravo, FSSR; 1st Scout Ranger Battalion, FSSR
- Battles/wars: Moro conflict Communist rebellion in the Philippines; Zamboanga City crisis Battle of Marawi

Carlito Guancing Galvez Jr. (Tagalog pronunciation: [kaɾˈlito ɡalˈvɛs], born December 12, 1962) is a retired Philippine Army general who became Presidential Adviser on Peace, Reconciliation and Unity (PAPRU) in 2023.

He had served as PAPRU since 2018, briefly stepping down in January 2023 to serve as Senior Undersecretary and officer-in-charge of the Department of National Defense, before being reappointed once more as PAPRU in June of the same year.

He also served as the Chief Implementer of the Philippines' Declared National Policy Against COVID-19 (COVID-19 National Task Force). In November 2020, he was appointed the country's COVID-19 vaccine czar, and was responsible for leading the government's efforts in bringing into the country about 245.23 million doses of COVID-19 vaccines as of May 2022 beginning in 2021 despite the global vaccine shortage.

Prior to this, he also previously served as the 50th Chief of Staff of the Armed Forces of the Philippines from April to December 2018.

== Education ==
A member of the PMA Sandiwa class of 1985, Galvez was also trained in airborne, intelligence, and special operations, particularly in the 1st Scout Ranger Regiment. Galvez received his master's degree in Project Management in the University of New South Wales, Australia, and took the Executive Education program in Harvard University, in Massachusetts. Galvez also has a specialty on Humanitarian Assistance, Strategic Management, and Peace-building Negotiations.

Galvez also attended the Asian Institute of Management Center for Bridging Leadership, the Infantry Officer Advance Course in Fort Benning, Georgia, the Military Operation Research Symposium in Singapore, the Crisis Management Course in Hawaii, the Counter-terrorism Conference in the National Defense University, in Washington, D.C., the Rules of Engagement in Sanremo, Italy and the AFP Command and Staff College Class 47, where he served as Class President and Valedictorian.

== Military career ==
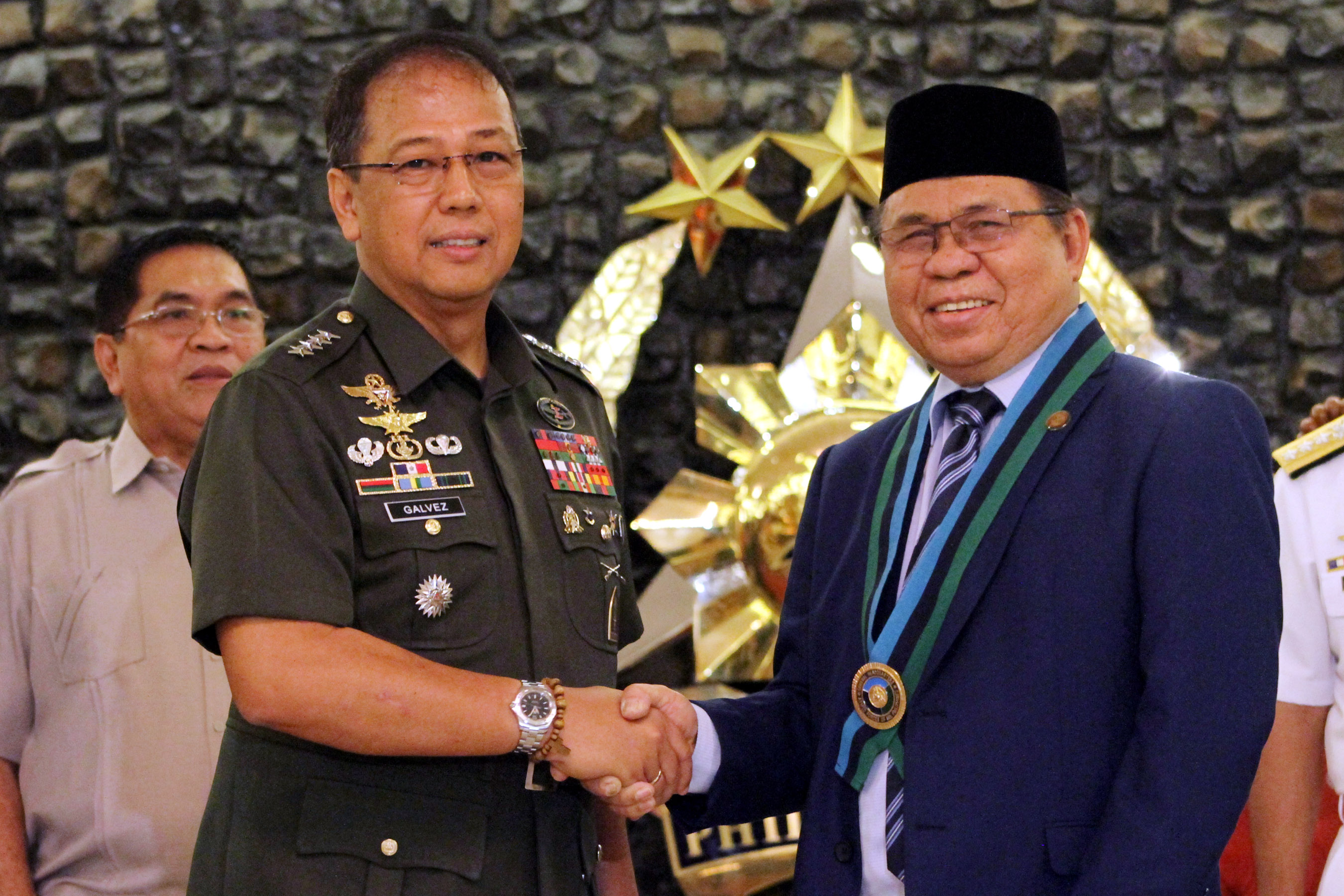
Galvez with Moro Islamic Liberation Front chairman and Chief Minister of Bangsamoro Murad Ebrahim in Camp Aguinaldo in November 2018

After graduating at the Philippine Military Academy in 1985, then-Lieutenant Galvez, along with then-Lieutenant Rolando Joselito Bautista and other AFP troops became a part of the Reform the Armed Forces Movement (RAM), under the leadership then-Colonel Gregorio Honasan, and participated in the failed coup attempt against President Corazon Aquino. Galvez and his coup co-conspirators were detained before being granted amnesty in 1996 by Aquino's successor, President Fidel Ramos. Throughout the 1990s, he spent most of his career in Mindanao, particularly in the islands of Basilan and Sulu, and commanded multiple units and commands in the Philippine Army and the AFP, including the 1st Scout Ranger Battalion, where his unit was named the "best scout ranger battalion" in 2 consecutive years (2000 and 2001) and the Task Group Panther Bravo of the 1st Scout Ranger Regiment.

General Galvez also served as commander of the 104th Brigade, and became the deputy chief of staff for operations, organization & training, J3. Galvez also made successful efforts on the peace process with the Moro Islamic Liberation Front in 2015 as co-chairman on the Government of the Philippines Coordinating Committees on the Cessation of Hostilities (GPH-CCCH), and afterwards, commanded the 6th Infantry Division. Galvez also led units during the Zamboanga City crisis, where he commanded infantry units and launched defense operations within the city of Lamitan in Basilan, after the city's surroundings were occupied from an attack of the Abu Sayyaf group and its allies. Galvez's units successfully defended the city from the terrorists in the aftermath of the group's two-day offensive from September 12 to 14, 2013.

=== Commander, AFP Western Mindanao Command ===
In January 2017, then-Lieutenant General Galvez began his tenure as the commander of the commander of the AFP Western Mindanao Command. During his term as the region's top commander, Galvez expanded his peace operations within the Autonomous Region in Muslim Mindanao (ARMM). Galvez became more known for his leadership throughout the campaign to liberate the city the Battle of Marawi, where he launched an all-out offensive to retake the city from the Maute and Abu Sayyaf terrorist groups, while secure the city's outskirt regions to prevent any terrorist reinforcements re-entering the city, and implemented safe zones with the assistance of the Moro Islamic Liberation Front.

In the aftermath of the Marawi Siege, Galvez also led numerous combat and neutralization operations against communists and Daesh-inspired groups, including Ben Salina Sapilin, a relative of Isnilon Hapilon, and intercepted numerous movements of terrorist groups, including piracy, in the region. Through his efforts on his diplomatic mentoring strategy in Western Mindanao, a total of 1,343 loose firearms were surrendered and recovered by the region's Joint Task Forces.

=== AFP Chief of Staff ===
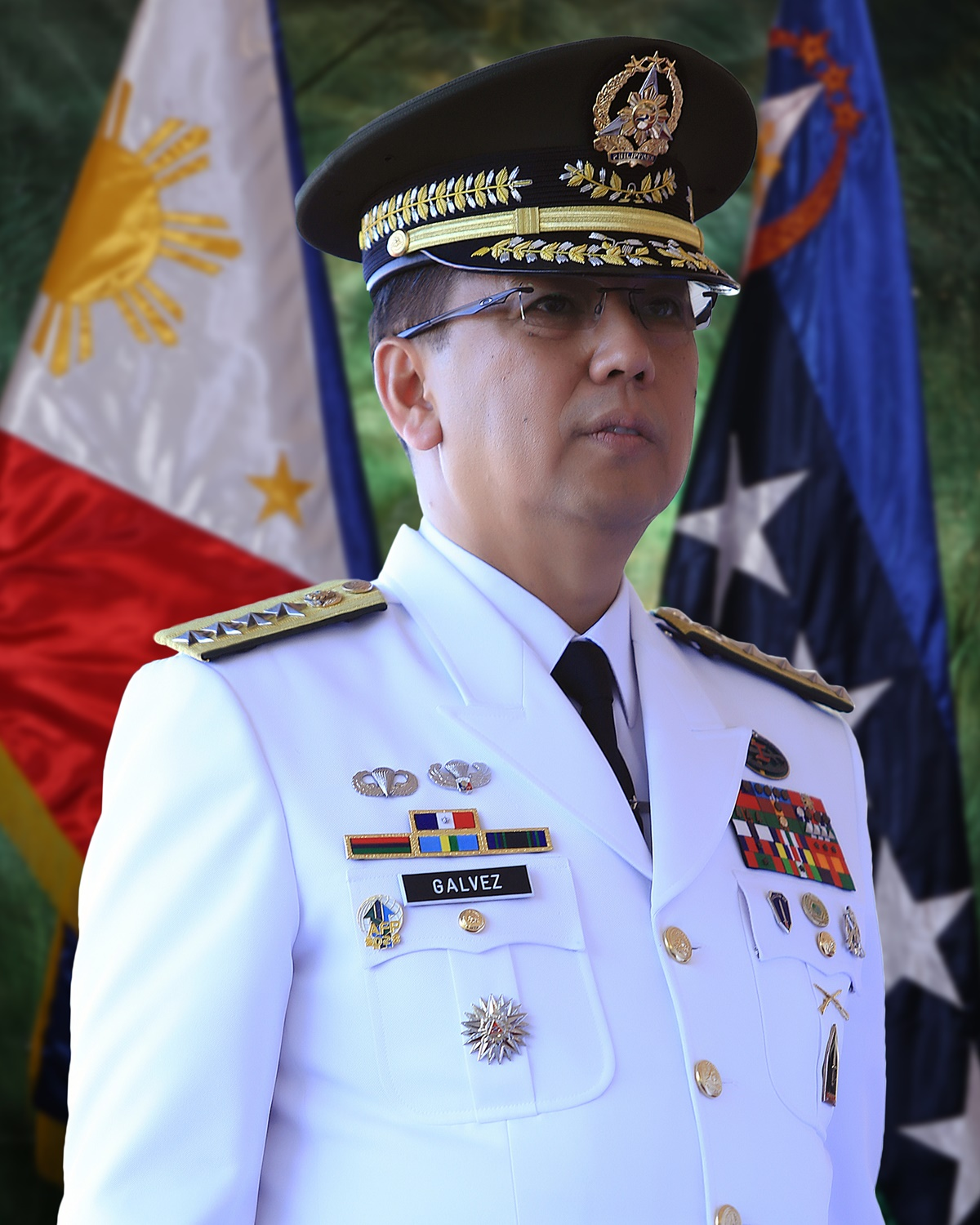
Galvez as Armed Forces Chief of Staff in 2018

Six months after the siege, Galvez was appointed the Chief of Staff of the Armed Forces of the Philippines on April 18, 2018. As AFP Chief, he focused on ending the decades-long communist insurgency, while addressing the threat of terrorism and extremism, particularly in Mindanao. General Galvez also expanded his peace initiatives throughout the country, which led to the surrender of members of various communist fronts and terrorist groups, while providing assistance to law enforcement agencies such as the Philippine National Police, Philippine Drug Enforcement Agency and the National Bureau of Investigation in the fight against illegal drugs and criminality elements. Galvez also spearheaded the AFP modernization program, where he implemented shifts on the program as part of the lessons from the Marawi Siege, such as the procurement of high-caliber weapons for internal and external defense, and initiated updated doctrines on enhancing urban warfare and human rights. Galvez also led in promoting transparency and good governance within the AFP organization. Galvez ended his term as AFP Chief on December 11, 2018, where he was succeeded by his classmate, Gen. Benjamin Madrigal Jr.

== Presidential Adviser on the Peace Process ==
On December 12, 2018, Galvez was appointed by President Rodrigo Duterte as Presidential Adviser on the Peace Process after the previous officeholder, Jesus Dureza, resigned amid a corruption scandal. He is a staunch advocate of the peace process with the Moro Front, and has been well received by many Bangsamoro stakeholders.

After President Duterte's term ended, Galvez remained presidential adviser under a "holdover capacity" until President Bongbong Marcos either appoints a new official or reappoints him to the post.

After his time as officer-in-charge of the Department of National Defense, Galvez was reappointed by Marcos as Presidential Adviser on the Peace Process on June 26, 2023. He was also appointed the Philippines' representative to the June 2024 Ukraine peace summit in Switzerland.

On 21 April 2026, Galvez formally resigned from his position as Presidential Adviser on the Peace Process, citing the need to attend to his wife's health while devoting more of his time to his family. He was eventually replaced by Mel Senen Sarmiento on the same day. Galvez also expressed gratitude to President Marcos for giving him both the trust and opportunity to serve the Filipino people, and is also confident in Sarmiento's appointment as a "champion of good governance and a man of peace" and the peace process "will reach even greater heights" under his leadership.

== National Defense Senior Undersecretary ==
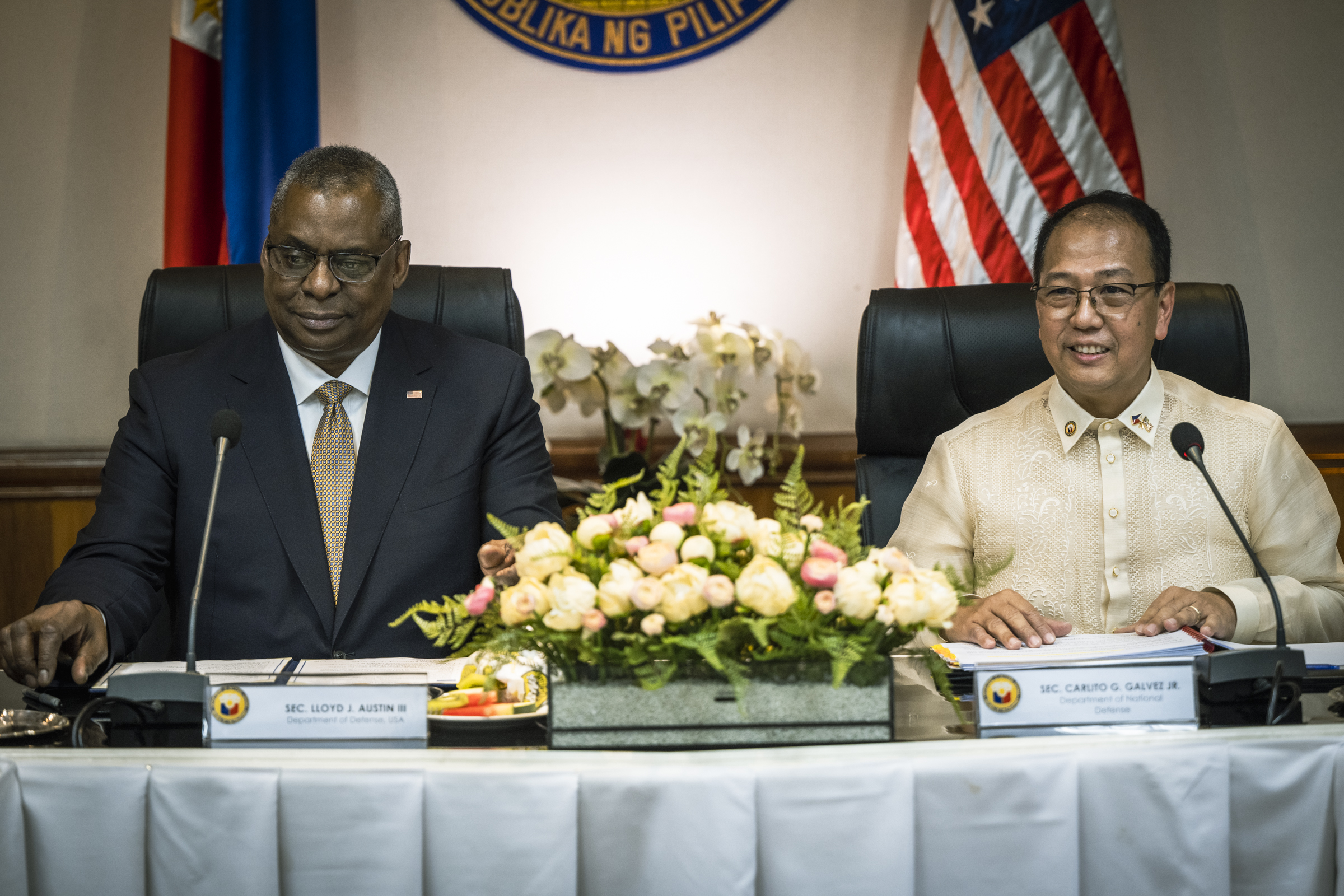
United States Secretary of Defense Lloyd J. Austin III meeting Galvez in Manila on February 2, 2023.

On January 9, 2023, Galvez accepted the appointment as senior undersecretary and officer-in-charge of Department of National Defense by President Bongbong Marcos. His time as officer-in-charge ended on June 5 upon the appointment of Gilbert Teodoro as Secretary of National Defense.

== Awards ==
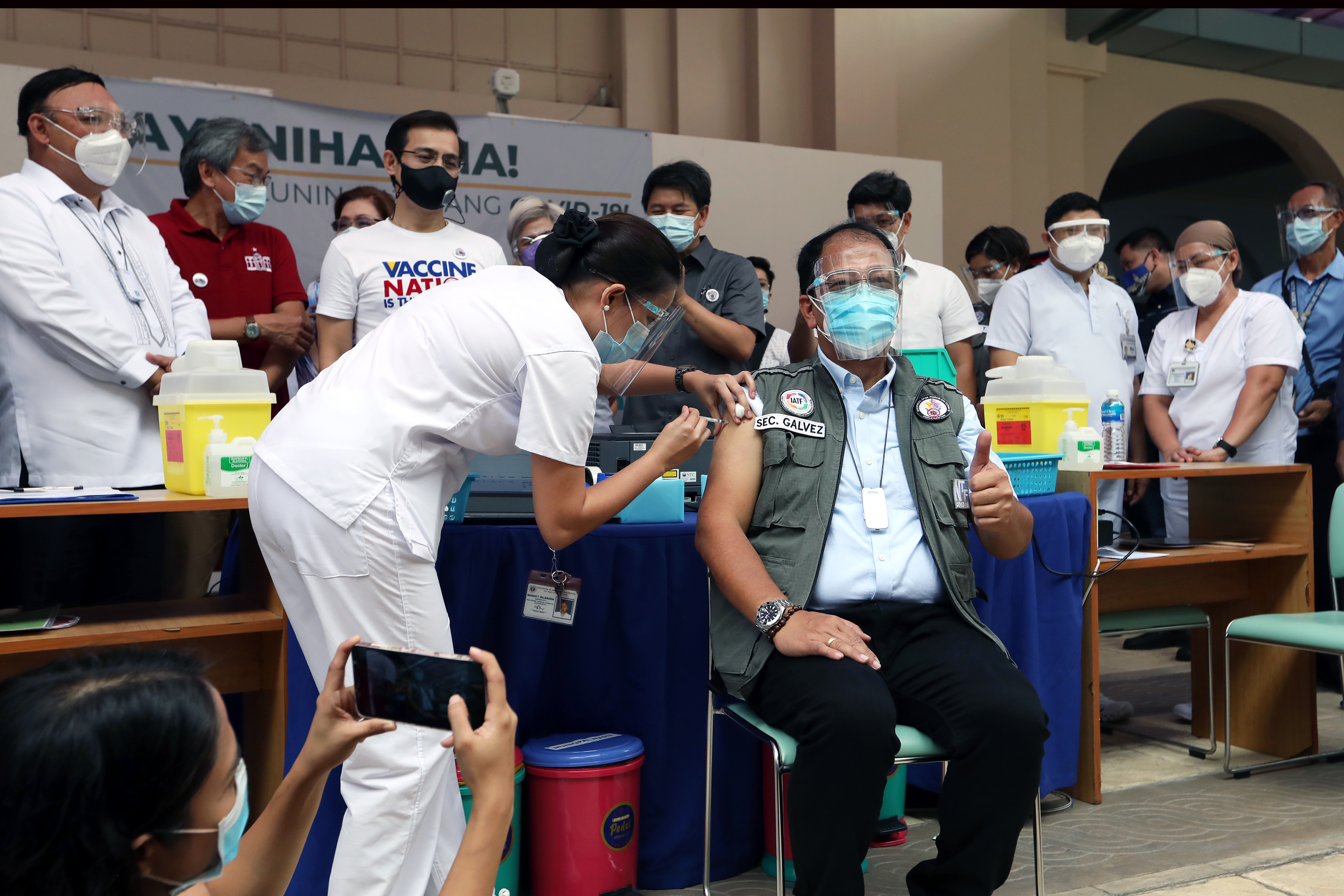
Galvez gets the CoronaVac vaccine at the UP-PGH in Manila in March 2021.

Left Side:

1st row		Chief Commander, Philippine Legion of Honor	
2nd row	Officer, Philippine Legion of Honor	3 Distinguished Service Stars with two bronze anahaw clusters	5 Gold Cross medals with four bronze anahaw clusters
3rd row	Order of Lapu-Lapu, Kamagi Medal	2 Outstanding Achievement Medal with one bronze anahaw cluster	6 Bronze Cross Medal with three bronze anahaw clusters
4th row	Military Merit Medals with three bronze anahaws (30 overall military merit medals)	Military Merit Medals with one spearhead device (30 overall military merit medals)	12 Military Commendation Medals with three triangle devices
5th row	Wounded Personnel Medal	2 Military Civic Action Medals	Long Service Medal with two campaign stars
6th row	2 Anti-Dissidence Campaign Medals	Luzon Anti-Dissidence Campaign Medal	Visayas Anti-Dissidence Campaign Medal
7th row	Mindanao Anti-Dissidence Campaign Medal with two campaign stars	Jolo and Sulu Campaign Medal with one campaign star	Disaster Relief and Rehabilitation Operations Ribbon

Right Side:

1st row		Philippine Republic Presidential Unit Citation	
2nd row	Martial Law Unit Citation	People Power I Unit Citation	People Power II Unit Citation

Badges and Other Awards:

- Legion of Merit (US Armed Forces)
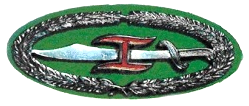
- Combat Commander's Badge (Philippines)
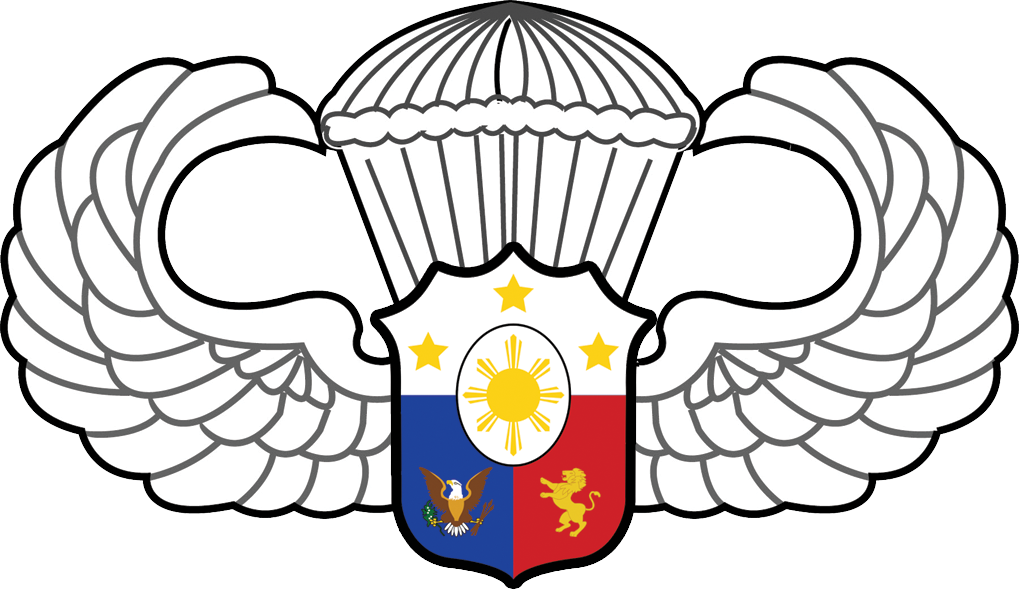
- AFP Parachutist Badge
- Scout Ranger Qualification Badge
- AFP Command & General Staff Course Badge
- PAF Gold Wings Badge
- AFP Leadership Award
- The Outstanding Philippine Soldiers in 2007
- United States Eisenhower Fellowships in 2006
- Gawad Dangal ng Lipi
- Department of Social Welfare and Development's (DSWD) “Salamat Po” Humanitarian Award
- Outstanding Citizen of Taguig City Award
- Ateneo Peace Award

== Personal life ==
Galvez is married to Marissa M. Pascua, an international flight purser of Philippine Airlines; they have a daughter, Mary Frances Therese.

Military offices
Preceded by Rey Leonardo Guerrero	Chief of Staff of the Armed Forces of the Philippines; 2018	Succeeded by Benjamin Madrigal Jr.
Political offices
Preceded by Jesus Dureza	Presidential Adviser on the Peace Process; 2018–2023	Succeeded by Isidro L. Purisima (Acting)
Preceded by Jose Faustino Jr. Officer-in-charge	Secretary of National Defense (Officer–in–Charge); 2023	Succeeded by Gilbert Teodoro
Preceded by Jose Faustino Jr.	Senior Undersecretary of National Defense; 2023	Succeeded by Angelito M. De Leon (Acting)
Preceded by Isidro L. Purisima (Acting)	Presidential Adviser on the Peace Process; 2023-2026	Succeeded by Mel Senen Sarmiento
