= Delfin Lorenzana =

Filipino government official and former Philippine Army general

Retired Major General Delfin Lorenzana AFP, OLH, KGOR
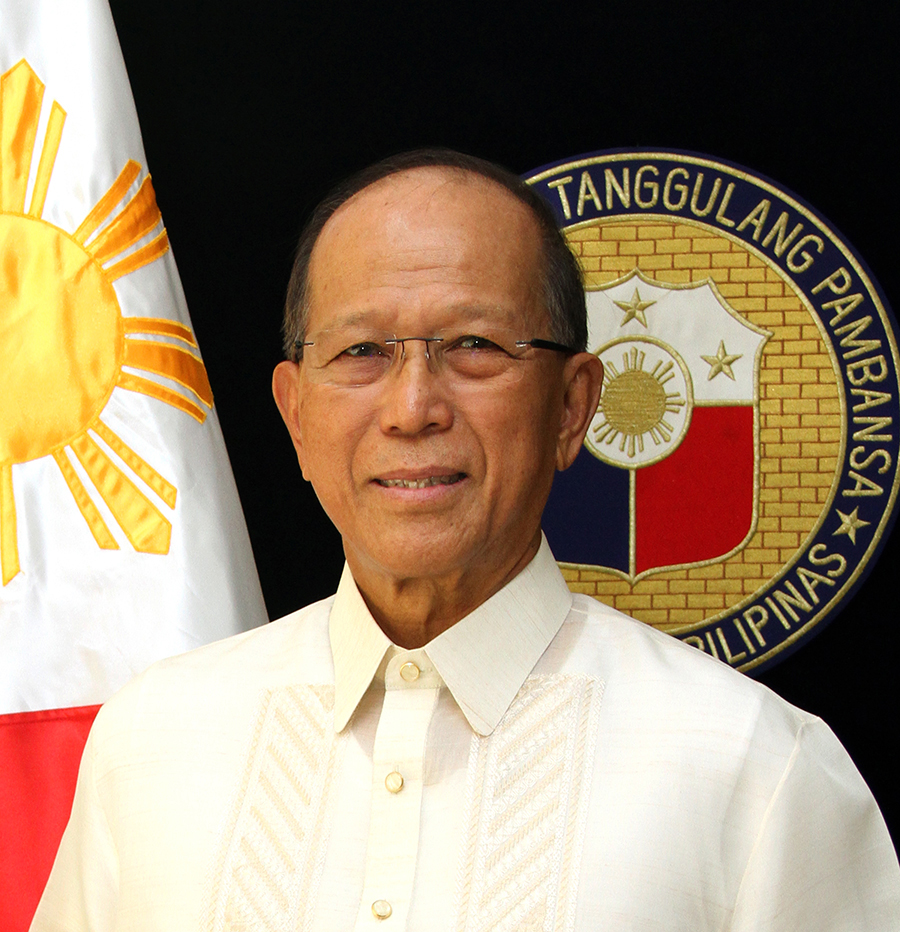
- The 36th Defense Secretary

Chairman of the Bases Conversion and Development Authority
- In office July 7, 2022 – September 10, 2024
- Appointed by: Bongbong Marcos
- Preceded by: Gregorio D. Garcia III
- Succeeded by: Thompson Lantion

26th Secretary of National Defense
- In office June 30, 2016 – June 30, 2022
- President: Rodrigo Duterte
- Preceded by: Voltaire Gazmin
- Succeeded by: Jose Faustino Jr. (OIC)

Chairman of the National Task Force against COVID-19
- In office March 16, 2020 – June 30, 2022
- President: Rodrigo Duterte
- Preceded by: Position established
- Succeeded by: DND OIC Usec. Jose Faustino Jr.

Co-Chairman of the Inter-Agency Task Force for the Management of Emerging Infectious Diseases
- In office March 4, 2022 – June 30, 2022
- President: Rodrigo Duterte
- Preceded by: Karlo Nograles; Roy Cimatu

Commander, AFP Special Operations Command
- In office 2001–2002
- President: Gloria Macapagal-Arroyo
- Preceded by: Dionisio Santiago
- Succeeded by: Hermogenes Esperon

Personal details
- Born: Delfin Negrillo Lorenzana; October 28, 1948 (age 77) Midsayap, Cotabato, Philippines
- Spouse: Editha Aguilar
- Education: Philippine Military Academy; Ateneo de Manila University
- Awards: Philippine Legion of Honor; Legion of Merit; Distinguished Service Star; Gold Cross; Feb. 86 Revolution Ribbon

Military service
- Allegiance: Philippines
- Branch/service: Philippine Army
- Years of service: 1973–2004
- Rank: Major General
- Commands: Special Operations Command; Presidential Security Group; 2nd Scout Ranger Battalion; Light Armored Brigade

Delfin Negrillo Lorenzana, OLH, KGOR (born October 28, 1948) is a retired Philippine Army general who served as Chairman of the Bases Conversion and Development Authority from 2022 until September 2024. He previously served as Secretary of National Defense in the Cabinet of President Rodrigo Duterte from 2016 to 2022. He served in the Philippine Army from 1973 to 2004.

== Education and training ==
Lorenzana graduated from the Philippine Military Academy as part of the Maagap Class of 1973.

He also obtained a master's degree in Business Administration, Major in Operations Research from the Ateneo Graduate School of Business; a Graduate Diploma in Strategic Studies from the Australian National University in Canberra, Australia; and a Certificate in Business Economics from the University of Asia and the Pacific.

He completed various courses in the Philippines and abroad, which include Senior International Leaders Course at John F. Kennedy School of Government, Harvard University; Crisis Management Course at the US State Department, Washington DC; and VIP Security Operations conducted by British Special Air Service (SAS) Regiment.

As a military officer, he had completed several local and foreign training. These included courses in infantry, scout ranger, intelligence, and airborne, culminating into the command and general staff course. From abroad, he completed the Royal Marines Commando Course in United Kingdom, Infantry Officer Advanced Course in Fort Benning, Georgia, USA; and the Instructor's Course in Fort Gordon, Georgia, USA.

== Military career ==
=== Platoon Leader, Company Commander, Staff Officer: March 1973 – April 1987 ===
As Platoon leader and Company Commander, Lorenzana led men in the Mindanao and Luzon Campaigns against Moro National Liberation Front secessionists and NPA insurgents, respectively. He also acted as staff officer of Army units up to Battalion level, and served as instructor at the Scout Ranger School and the Army Training Command (1985).

He also helped reorganize the Army Intelligence Unit after the EDSA Revolution.

=== Battalion Commander, 2nd Scout Ranger Battalion, 6th Infantry Division, Davao City: April 1987 – August 1989 ===
As the Battalion Commander, Lorenzana was responsible for maintaining peace and order in Davao City outside the City Proper. He supported, strengthened, and led the people-based Alsa Masa Movement to clear Davao City of insurgents, sparrow units and other criminal groups, in coordination with the City Government under then newly elected Mayor Rodrigo Duterte and the Davao City Metropolitan District Command under Lt Col Franco Calida (PC).

=== Presidential Security Group (PSG): September 1989 – June 1991 ===
Lorenzana developed operational and training plans for PSG units and personnel, and for the development of security plans for Malacañang Palace, then President Corazon Aquino, her family and other VIPs.

He assisted the Presidential Assistant for Military Affairs (PAMA) in handling communications between GHQ to the Palace.

He gained national prominence after successfully defending Malacañang against rebel soldiers who attempted to overrun the palace in November to December 1989, by making sure that PSG troops were in constant readiness.

=== Deputy Chief, Joint Operations Center, General Headquarters: May 1992 – April 1994 ===
Lorenzana was responsible for monitoring the operations of all Armed Forces units and commands all over the country. He delivered daily summary and brief for the AFP Chief of Staff, and prepared staff studies on national security situation. He also monitored and ensured that major AFP assets such as ships, aircraft, guns and special units are in readiness at all times.

He also concurrently served as Commander of the AFP Rapid Deployment Force (RDF) Battalion, where he led the RDF Battalion in successful operations against the Communist Party of the Philippines - New People's Army (CPP-NPA) insurgents in Camarines Sur and Southern Leyte.

=== Assistant Chief of Unified Command Staff for Operations (U3), Headquarters, Southern Command: April – September 1993 ===
Aside from making operations plans, troop deployment and Disaster Rescue Plans in SouthCom area encompassing the whole of Mindanao, Basilan, Sulu and Tawi-Tawi, Lorenzana supervised the successful operation against the Abu Sayyaf terrorist group based in their Al-Madinah Camp in Basilan in May 1993.

=== Assistant Chief of Staff for Personnel (G1), Philippine Army: April 1993 – January 1998 ===
Taking charge of the morale and welfare of the Army, Lorenzana managed all aspects pertaining to PA personnel from recruitment to retirement such as records management, career management, assignment, schooling, promotions, health, family support, and sports and recreation. Among his notable accomplishments was the improvement of the personnel management database of the Philippine Army through computerization.

=== Assistant Chief of Unified Command Staff for Operations (U3), Headquarters, Visayas Command: September 1993 – May 1994 ===
During this time, Lorenzana formulated operational plans, troop deployment plan and Disaster Rescue Plans for the entire island of Visayas. He successfully supervised and managed security operations in the area.

=== Commanding Officer, 601st Infantry Brigade, 6th Division: January 1998 – February 2001 ===
With four Infantry Battalions, a 155 Howitzer battery and one Light Armor Company under his command, the division was responsible for maintaining peace and order in South Cotabato, part of Sultan Kudarat, Sarangani and Davao del Sur.

During this time, Lorenzana served as a member of the Government Peace Panel during talks with the secessionist Moro Islamic Liberation Front (MILF) from 1998 to 2001.

Their division captured the kidnap-for-ransom leader Tahir Alonto and his group in July 1999 and brought three hostages to safety. When Tahir Alonto's men attacked the General Santos Police prison in November 2000 to free their leader, Lorenzana's men succeeded in recovering more than 50 escapees.

With President Joseph Estrada's "all-out war" pronouncement against the MILF, Lorenzana's troops overran and captured three MILF camps during the AFP campaign from 1998 to 2000. They then maintained peace and order in their area of operation, enabling the local and national government to pursue development projects without interference from lawless elements.

=== Commander, Army Light Armored Brigade: March 2001 – July 2001 ===
During this time, Lorenzana oversaw the training and maintenance of Armor personnel and assets and ensured that Armor personnel and assets are properly deployed and utilized by supported units, and that Armor units are properly provisioned and supplied.

As concurrent Ground Commander of the Task Force Libra, Lorenzana's unit was deployed in Metro Manila to maintain a ready ground force to maintain stability. His forces secured former President Estrada while he was detained at the Veterans Medical Memorial Center and prevented pro-Erap forces from barging in the compound to free him. On May 1, 2001, with three battalions of troops and armor assets, the unit effectively prevented the overrun of Malacañang Palace by about 70,000 pro-Erap mob who were bent on unseating then newly installed President Gloria Macapagal Arroyo. This dispersal operation was smoothly and peacefully accomplished, with only minor injuries to the operating troops and the pro-Erap mob.

=== Commander, Special Operations Command: July 2001 – July 2002 ===
Lorenzana was responsible for organizing, equipping, training and deploying Special Operations Command (SOCOM) forces all over the Philippines. During his stint at SOCOM, he led the conduct of the successful Balikatan 01-1 exercises involving United States Special Forces and AFP personnel in Mindanao. The exercise contributed to the recovery by SOCOM elements of the American couple Martin and Gracia Burnham from their Abu Sayyaf kidnappers in July 2002.

== Embassy of the Philippines in Washington, D.C. ==
=== Special Presidential Representative for Veterans Affairs, Philippine Embassy, Washington, DC ===
As former head of Veterans Affairs Office, Lorenzana developed and implemented the Philippine campaign to obtain veterans benefits for Filipino soldiers who served under the United States Army during World War II. He also coordinated closely with Philippine-based Filipino veterans on the lobby effort.

He also helped secure $0.5M annual grant-in-aid for the Veterans Memorial Medical Center 2003-2015 that totaled $12M+ over twelve years, and worked for the unification of Filipino-American efforts in support of the World War II (WW2) Filipino veterans equity lobby in the United States. This unified effort was instrumental in the passage of the Filipino Veterans Equity Compensation Fund with an appropriation of $198M on February 17, 2009. An additional $67M was appropriated in 2010 for a total of $265M that awarded $9K/$15K for each qualified surviving Filipino WW2 veteran (naturalized US Citizens/Filipinos).

Notably, Lorenzana also lobbied for the Parole Program for children of Filipino WW2 veterans to join their parents in the United States. This was signed thru Executive Order by US President Obama in July 2015 and is now being implemented by the United States Department of Homeland Security.

=== Defense and Armed Forces Attaché ===
His last posting as a military officer was as defense attaché at the Philippine Embassy in Washington D.C., US, where he retired in 2004 with the rank of major general.

As Defense and Armed Forces Attaché, he oversaw and monitored the military bilateral relations between the Republic of the Philippines and the United States on the Visiting Forces Agreement, military exercises, military aid, military training and foreign military sales. He also monitored and supported the Armed Forces of the Philippines personnel on schooling in the United States.

Lorenzana also helped develop the terms of reference for the Balikatan 02-2 Exercises between the AFP and the US Pacific Command in Basilan Philippines in 2002, to support military operations aimed to neutralize the Abu Sayyaf in Southern Philippines.

Likewise, he assisted the Philippine Ambassador to the United States in obtaining military assistance from the US namely: Foreign military sales amounting close to $100 million, military training and exercises amounting to $9 million, and the grant-in-aid of 20 Huey helicopters and 1 Cyclone Special Operations ship.

== Secretary of National Defense ==
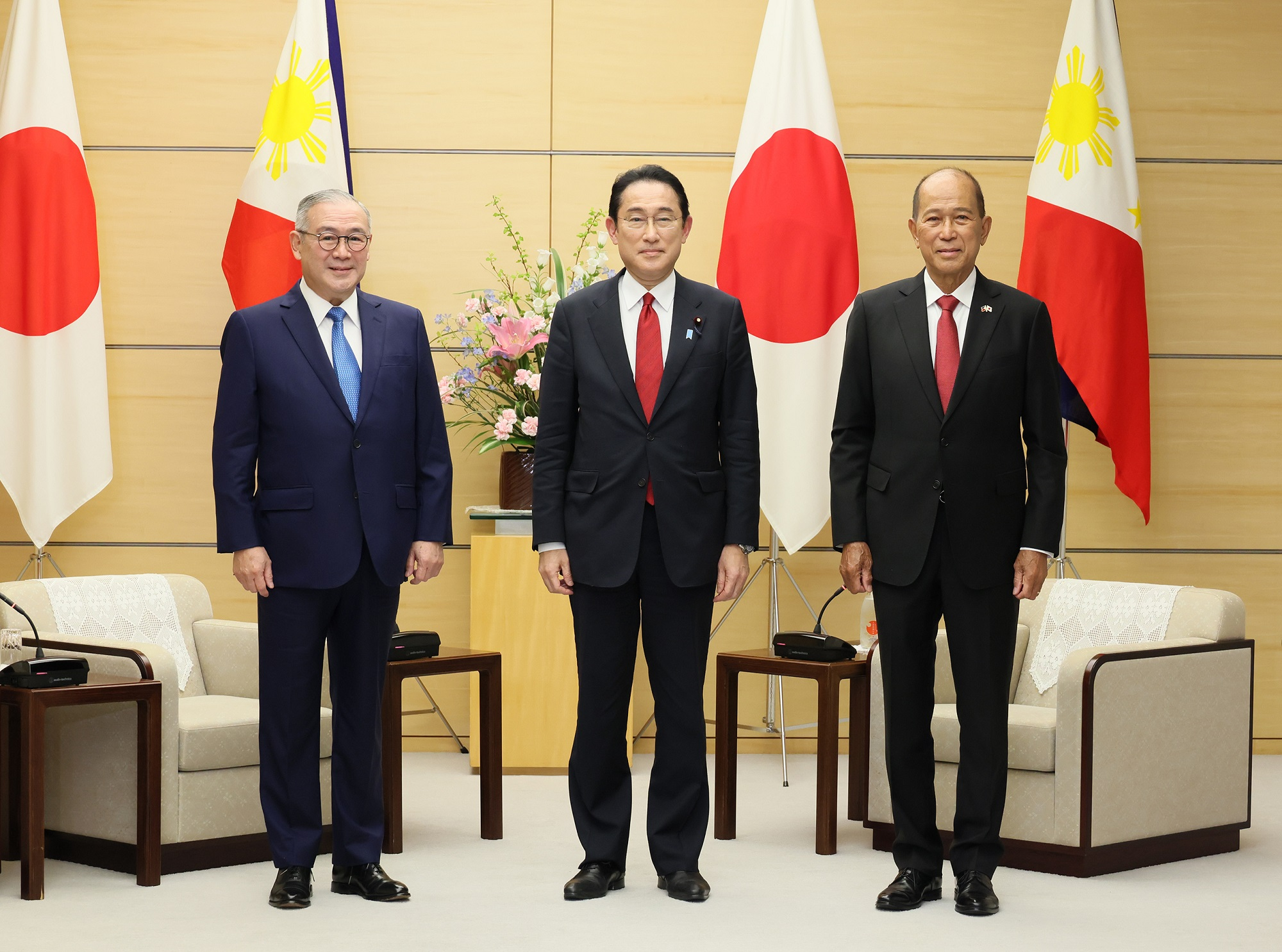
Lorenzana and Secretary of Foreign Affairs Teodoro Locsin Jr. with Prime Minister of Japan Fumio Kishida in April 2022

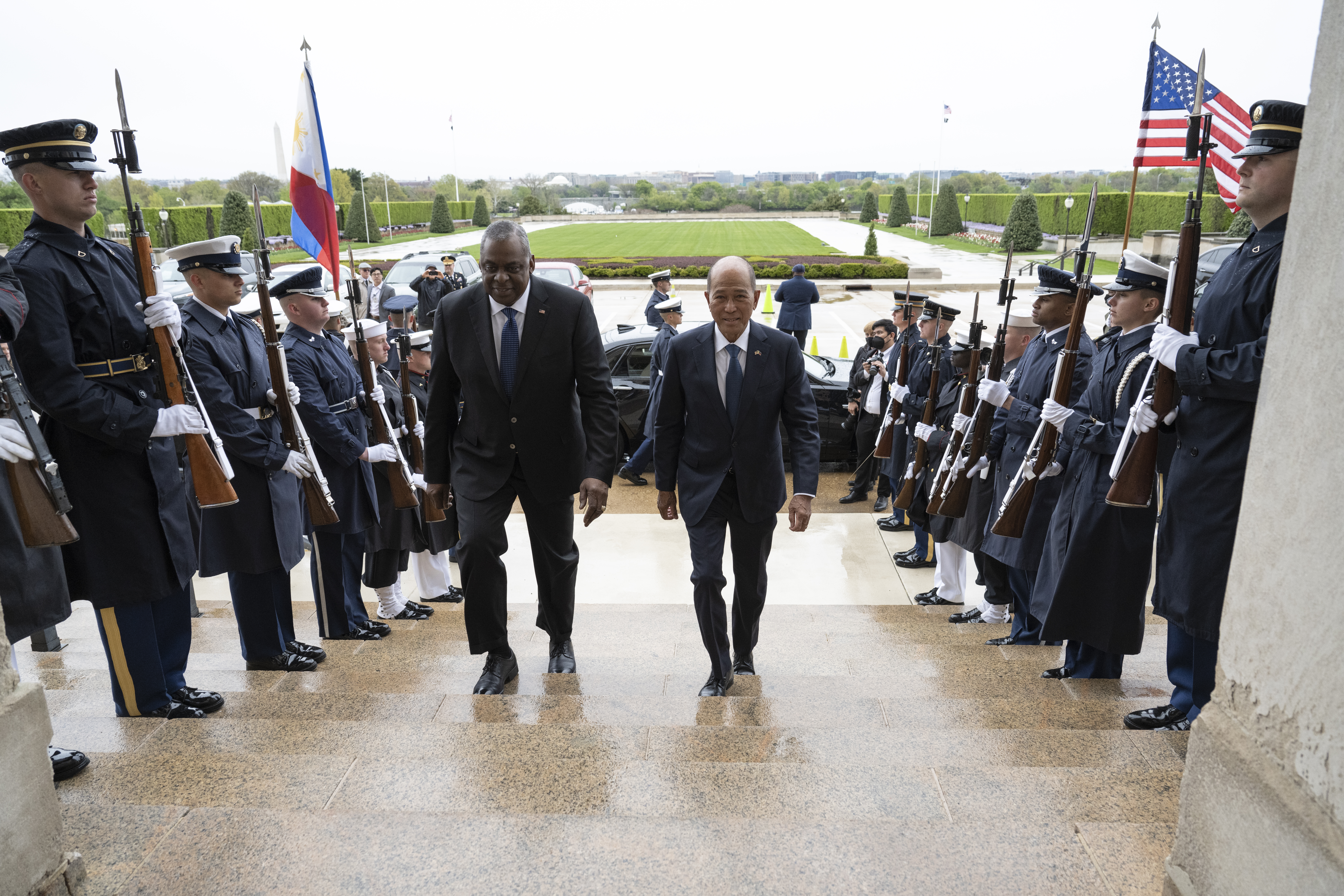
Lorenzana with U.S. Secretary of Defense Lloyd Austin in April 2022

After Rodrigo Duterte won the 2016 presidential election, Lorenzana was named as the incoming Secretary of National Defense. He took office on the same day as Duterte, June 30, on an ad interim basis. In an interview with Reuters, he announced that crushing Abu Sayyaf, supporting the war against drugs, and enforcing sovereignty in the South China Sea will be his priorities. However, in August, Duterte offered the position of defense secretary to Gilbert Teodoro, who served in that position under President Gloria Macapagal Arroyo. He then offered Lorenzana to become ambassador to the United States. Both men declined their respective offers, thus Lorenzana stayed as defense secretary. His appointment was then confirmed by the bicameral Commission on Appointments on October 19.

As Defense Chief, he directed programs to enhance the country's territorial defense, internal security operations, total force capability build-up, humanitarian assistance and disaster response, and international defense security engagements. He also watches over operations of the department's civilian bureaus - managing disaster preparedness, developing a self-reliant defense industry, and improving the welfare and well-being of the country's defenders - the Filipino veterans and soldiers, as well as their families.

Lorenzana is among the "Davao Boys", a small circle of Duterte's closest and trusted associates, which included police officers who were previously posted to Davao and later tasked with implementing the drug war nationwide.

=== Chairperson of the National Task Force Against COVID-19 ===
On March 25, 2020, Secretary Lorenzana was designated by President Duterte to lead the National Task Force (NTF) created by the Inter-Agency Task Force for the Management of Emerging Infectious Diseases to fight COVID-19. As such, he handled the operational command to implement the National Action Plan (NAP) that was created to implement and decentralize the system of managing the COVID-19 pandemic response.

The appointment of military personnel such as Lorenzana to lead the country's COVID-19 response was criticized for promoting an overly militarized response to the health pandemic.

=== Chairperson of the Security, Justice and Peace Cluster ===
With the reorganization of the Duterte Cabinet in May 2016 through Executive Order No. 24, Lorenzana assumed a bigger role as Chairperson of the Security, Justice, and Peace Cluster. The cluster works to protect the national territory and boundaries of the Philippines, attain just and lasting peace, ensure welfare of Overseas Filipino Workers, strengthen the rule of law, institutionalize an efficient and impartial justice system; and protect human rights. Under his leadership, the cluster crafted its roadmap until 2022 which the member agencies are resolutely fulfilling, as part of the government's sworn commitment to the Filipino people.

=== Martial Law Administrator ===
On May 23, 2017, shortly after the Marawi City was besieged by foreign and local terrorists, he was appointed by the President Rodrigo Duterte as administrator of Martial Law in Mindanao, pursuant to Presidential Proclamation No. 217.

Under his guidance, the implementation of Martial Law by the security forces is one that was non-invasive and non-intrusive, but nonetheless, highly effective towards neutralizing the threats of rebellion, terrorism, and violent extremism. Grounded on the AFP's mandate to protect the fundamental rights of the people, which are guaranteed by the Constitution of the Philippines, the defense chief ably directed the armed forces to observe and adhere to the rule of law, protect human rights, and uphold the international humanitarian law.

Pursuant to Lorenzana's recommendation, the Martial Law in Mindanao was no longer extended by the President after it lapsed on December 31, 2019. Its objectives have been successfully achieved upon the termination of rebellion in Marawi City, Lanao del Sur, and other areas in Mindanao, effectively restoring peace and order.

Government security forces were able to neutralize thousands of local, foreign and communist terrorist groups, most of whom surrendered while others were either captured or killed during military operations. In a 2018 statement, Philippine Army personnel said "3,187 high-powered firearms and 2,325 low-powered firearms have been confiscated or voluntarily surrendered".

The success of martial law may also be attributed to the closer engagements of the AFP with local leaders down to the barangay level, and the efficient monitoring of the performance of local chief executives, in support to the good governance agenda of the Duterte Administration.

=== CORDS for the Bangsamoro Autonomous Region in Muslim Mindanao ===
In May 2019, Secretary Lorenzana was again designated as the Cabinet Officer for Regional Development and Security for the Bangsamoro Autonomous Region in Muslim Mindanao. The region is now undergoing fast transition as the Bangsamoro Organic Law is being implemented. While this designation is pursuant to Executive Order No. 70 creating the National Task Force to End Local Communist Armed Conflict, he also fully supports Muslims in their exercise of their right to autonomy and self-determination under one Philippine Flag.

Given the enactment of the Bangsamoro Organic Law and its subsequent ratification after the resounding success of a two-part plebiscite, the government is now enabling the Bangsamoro Transition Authority in implementing the normalization process which includes, among others, the demilitarization of surrendered firearms as well as the decommissioning of the Moro Islamic Liberation Front Fighters. These steps are essential in building lasting peace and inclusive development and progress in the region.

=== AFP Modernization ===
Under his leadership, the capacity and capability building of the Armed Forces of the Philippines became a top priority of the current administration.

Under the AFP Modernization Program, 80% of all projects under the Horizon 1 and Horizon 2 have been completed as of third quarter of 2020. Among the vital assets delivered in 2020 include the BRP Jose Rizal, the first missile frigate of the Philippine Navy; six brand-new Super Tucano from Brazil for close air support, light attack, aerial reconnaissance missions, and counter insurgency; first batch of the Sikorsky S70-I Blackhawk Helicopters from Poland; and Php1.38 billion worth of defense gears from the US Defense Department.

In the next few months and years, the Philippines can expect the delivery of more planes to patrol its skies, more ships to defend its maritime domain, more equipment for Filipino troops to monitor and respond to threats, and better systems to quickly adapt to change.

=== Chairperson of the National Disaster Risk Reduction and Management Council ===
As Chairperson of the National Disaster Risk Reduction and Management Council, Secretary Lorenzana works to empower Filipino citizens through disaster preparedness, and to build climate and disaster-resilient communities.

On the policy side, he is steadfast in implementing Philippine Disaster Risk Reduction and Management Act of 2010, and in honoring Philippines’ international commitments such as the Hyogo Framework and the Sendai Framework towards building the resilience of nations and communities to disasters. He also actively promotes regional cooperation among ASEAN countries to strengthen resilience and sustain economic growth amidst the presence of hazards.

He also personally joins pre-and post-disaster assessment inspections and briefings like what he did during Typhoon Haima or Super Typhoon Lawin, Battle of Marawi, Pampanga and Mindanao Earthquakes, 2020 Taal Volcano Eruption, and other disasters.

Under his leadership, three-government command and control centers in Visayas and Mindanao and several regional evacuation centers in various provinces were built. He likewise facilitated the inauguration of the Disaster Emergency Logistics System for ASEAN (DELSA) Philippines satellite warehouse.

=== Veterans' and soldiers' causes ===
Under the current administration, Php6.421 billion was ordered released by President Duterte to settle the arrearages in pensions of AFP retirees covering fiscal years 2008 to 2013. This was made possible through the Lorenzana's genuine concern for his fellow veterans and their families.

In 2018, the Philippine Congress enacted RA No. 11164 increasing the pension of World War II, Korean War, and Vietnam War veterans from Php5,000 to Php20,000. Lorenzana's leadership was instrumental in the approval of this monumental welfare legislation for veterans that was strongly supported by the President.

=== Controversies ===
On September 8, 2020, Lorenzana confirmed to the House of Representatives that he signed a contract allowing Dito Telecommunity (which is 40% owned by the Government of China through China Telecom) to install cell towers inside Filipino military camps despite multiple security concerns. He assured there are enough safeguards in the deal, saying the "security of our camps will be maintained."

In the final week of December, Duterte revealed to the public that several military men have already been inoculated with the Chinese COVID-19 vaccine from Sinopharm even though the Food and Drug Administration (FDA) has not yet approved the import and use of any COVID-19 vaccine. Lorenzana confirmed that the Presidential Security Group (PSG) have already been vaccinated, though he himself was not. He later confirmed that the vaccines were donated and smuggled, and that the PSG "violated FDA rules". However, he defended the vaccination, saying: "They did it in good faith. Now everybody there is safe from COVID-19". He then told the FDA to "expedite its approval of COVID-19 vaccines so that legitimate importers could start importing". He also assured that the rest of the armed forces will wait for an FDA-approved COVID-19 vaccine.

On January 15, 2021, Lorenzana sent a letter to Danilo Concepcion, the president of the University of the Philippines (UP), that the DND has unilaterally terminated the UP–DND accord, a 1989 agreement that sets guidelines on military and police operations inside the university. He called the agreement "obsolete", and reasoned that its abrogation was necessary since the New People's Army (NPA) have "embedded themselves inside UP and are recruiting university students". He insisted that UP has become "a safe haven for enemies of the State", and that the university administration failed to prevent its students from joining the communists. The abrogation was met with protests from the university's students and faculty, as well as progressive groups and government officials, calling it a threat to academic freedom. Nonetheless, on January 21, Lorenzana announced the unilateral abrogation of a similar pact between the DND and the Polytechnic University of the Philippines (PUP) that was signed in 1990.

== Post-cabinet ==
On October 7, 2024, Lorenzana filed his candidacy to run in the 2025 Philippine Senate election as an independent candidate. However, he withdrew his candidacy the next day due to undisclosed reasons.

== Personal life ==
Lorenzana was born on October 28, 1948, in Midsayap, Cotabato, to poor Ilocano parents, Teodoro Lorenzana, who is a corn, rice and coconut farmer and Juanita Negrillo, both hailing from San Quintin, Pangasinan but traces their roots from Ilocos Sur and La Union. He was raised in Parang where he attended elementary and high school. He attended Notre Dame University in Cotabato City for two years before entering Philippine Military Academy.

Lorenzana is married to Editha Aguilar from Caloocan. They have four children, including Cecille Lorenzana-Romero, executive director of the National Parks Development Committee, and one granddaughter.

In April 2021, while serving as Chairman of the National Task Force against COVID-19, Lorenzana revealed that he had contracted the virus, although he claims that he is asymptomatic.

== Awards in military service ==
- Philippine Republic Presidential Unit Citation
- People Power I Unit Citation
- People Power II Ribbon
- Martial Law Unit Citation
- Distinguished Service Stars
- Gold Cross
- Philippine Legion of Honor (Degree of Officer)
- Military Merits
- Military Commendation Medals
- Military Civic Action Medal
- Long Service Medal
- Anti-dissidence Campaign Medal
- Luzon Anti-Dissidence Campaign Medal
- Visayas Anti-Dissidence Campaign Medal
- Mindanao Anti-Dissidence Campaign Medal
- Disaster Relief and Rehabilitation Operations Ribbon
- Legion of Merit (Degree of Officer)
- Combat Commander's Badge (Philippines)
- AFP Parachutist Badge
- Philippine Army Command and General Staff Course Badge
- Scout Ranger Qualification Badge

== Civilian Honors ==
- : Knight Grand Officer of Rizal of the Order of the Knights of Rizal.

Political offices
Preceded by Voltaire Gazmin	Secretary of National Defense; 2016–2022	Succeeded by Jose Faustino Jr. (OIC)
