= Thompson Lantion =

Filipino retired police officer and government official

Chairman of the Bases Conversion and Development Authority
- Incumbent
- Assumed office September 9, 2024
- President: Bongbong Marcos
- Preceded by: Delfin Lorenzana

Personal details
- Born: Thompson C. Lantion
- Party: Partido Federal ng Pilipinas
- Education: Philippine Military Academy (BS)
- Police career
- Service: Philippine National Police
- Divisions: Directorate for research and development; Cagayan Valley Regional Police Office
- Service years: 1973–2003
- Rank: Police Director

Thompson Lantion is a Filipino retired police officer and current Bases Conversion and Development Authority (BCDA) chairman. He is also the current secretary-general of the Partido Federal ng Pilipinas.

== Police career ==
Graduate of Philippine Military Academy class of 1973 (with retired army general and former Secretary of National Defense Delfin Lorenzana as one of his batchmate), Lantion worked as the regional director of the Cagayan Valley Regional Police Office, directorate for police community relations, and with directorate for research and development.

== Government career ==
After retiring, Lantion served as DOTC Spokesperson (from 2003), and undersecretary for maritime transport until June 2010. He also served as chairman of Land Transportation Franchising and Regulatory Board.

He later served as secretary general of the Partido Federal ng Pilipinas.

On September 9, 2024, Lantion was appointed by president and his partymate Bongbong Marcos to be the chairman of the Bases Conversion and Development Authority, replacing his batchmate Lorenzana.
