= Norberto Gonzales =

Filipino government official and politician (born 1947)

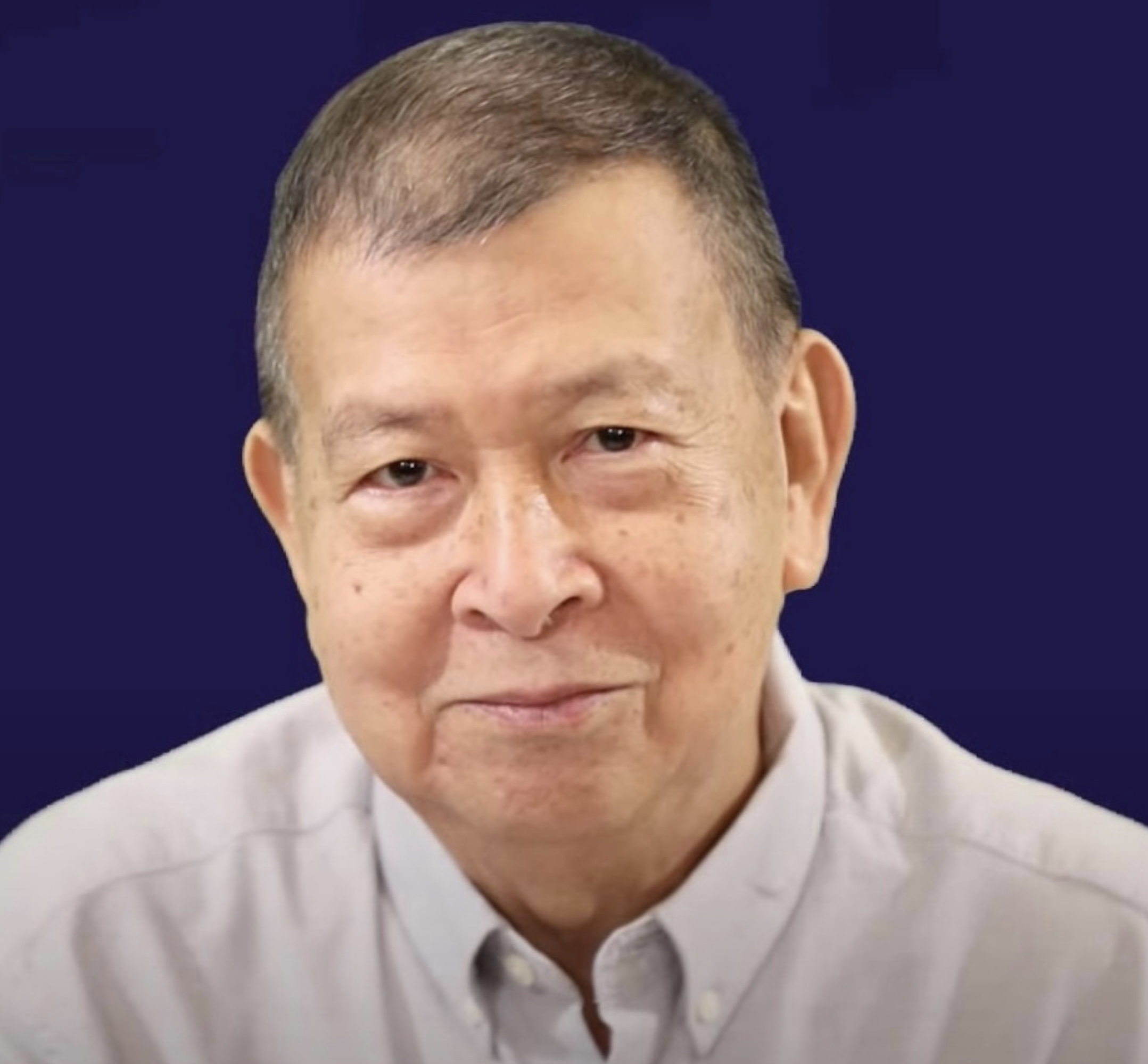

24th Secretary of National Defense
- In office November 15, 2009 – June 30, 2010
- President: Gloria Macapagal Arroyo
- Preceded by: Gilbert Teodoro
- Succeeded by: Voltaire Gazmin
- Officer in Charge
- In office July 2, 2007 – August 7, 2007
- President: Gloria Macapagal Arroyo
- Preceded by: Hermogenes Ebdane
- Succeeded by: Gilbert Teodoro

National Security Adviser
- In office February 2005 – July 2, 2007
- President: Gloria Macapagal Arroyo

Malacañang Chief of Staff
- In office 2004–2005
- President: Gloria Macapagal Arroyo
- Preceded by: Rigoberto Tiglao
- Succeeded by: Mike Defensor

Personal details
- Born: Norberto Borja Gonzales; April 17, 1947 (age 79) Balanga, Bataan, Philippines
- Party: Partido Demokratiko Sosyalista ng Pilipinas
- Education: Ateneo de Davao
- Occupation: Politician

Norberto Borja Gonzales (born April 17, 1947) is a Filipino social democratic politician who served as secretary of national defense and national security adviser under 14th President Gloria Macapagal Arroyo. Gonzales was a candidate in the 2022 presidential election and the 2025 Senate election.

== Career ==
=== Foundation of the PDSP ===
Gonzales completed a pre-medicine course in Ateneo de Davao. During the second term of President Ferdinand Marcos, Gonzales joined the burgeoning anti-government protests. The protest movement he co-organized became the Kilusan ng mga Demokratikong Sosyalista ng Pilipinas, which later became the Partido Demokratiko Sosyalista ng Pilipinas (PDSP). The PDSP worked together with the Moro National Liberation Front (MNLF) to help overthrow Marcos. Once Marcos was ousted, his successor Corazon Aquino appointed him as a negotiator to the MNLF. Two years later, a peace agreement was signed between the government and the MNLF. A decade later. Gonzales was appointed presidential adviser for special concerns and presidential chief of staff by President Gloria Macapagal Arroyo.

=== Arroyo administration ===
Gonzales was appointed as national security adviser in February 2005 until his appointment as the defense chief in July 2007. He briefly served for a month and was replaced by Gilbert Teodoro. As national security adviser, he was ordered detained by the Senate for contempt of Congress in 2005. Later on, he cited the ongoing communist insurgency as a reason why the Philippines remained a "Third World country." He proposed crafting a good strategy to defeat the rebels, or extending President Gloria Macapagal Arroyo's term.

After Teodoro's announcement of his presidential candidacy, Gonzales served as the secretary of national defense again from November 2009 until June 30, 2010.

=== Post-Arroyo administration ===
Upon Teodoro losing in the 2010 election, he and Gonzales were originally seen to form the new opposition bloc to counter president-elect Benigno Aquino III. In 2015, Senator Antonio Trillanes said that Gonzales was planning a coup to oust Aquino. Gonzales replied that while "coups don't succeed in the Philippines," president Aquino should "step down."

During the presidency of Rodrigo Duterte, Gonzales said that "a Chinese invasion is not unthinkable."

=== 2022 presidential campaign ===
Gonzales is the chairman and official nominee for president in the 2022 election of the Philippine Democratic Socialist Party. He announced and filed his candidacy on October 6, 2021. A lifelong social democrat, he insists on a "new and more politically mature approach to winning the nation's heart and its consent to govern." He also wants the Department of Agriculture to be reformed and asserted that "food production" will be his priority if elected. He mentioned President Rodrigo Duterte’s "weak COVID-19 response" as one of the main reasons why he ran for president. He ended up being on the 9th place in the 2022 presidential election having about 89,097 votes.

=== 2025 Senate campaign ===
On October 7, 2024, Gonzales filed his candidacy to run for senator in the 2025 Philippine Senate election, under the Philippine Democratic Socialist Party but lost, placing 45th place.

== Electoral history ==
Electoral history of Norberto Gonzales
Year	Office	Party	Votes received				Result
Year	Office	Party	Total	%	P.	Swing	Result
2022	President of the Philippines	PDSP	90,656	0.17%	9th	—N/a	Lost
2025	Senator of the Philippines	PDSP	990,091	1.73%	45th	—N/a	Lost

Government offices
Preceded by Hermogenes Ebdane	Secretary of National Defense; Acting; 2007	Succeeded by Gilbert Teodoro
Preceded by Gilbert Teodoro	Secretary of National Defense; Acting; 2009–2010	Succeeded by Voltaire Gazmin
Party political offices
First	Partido Demokratiko Sosyalista ng Pilipinas nominee for President of the Philippines; 2022	Most recent
