= Voltaire Gazmin =

Filipino politician and general (born 1944)

Voltaire T. Gazmin
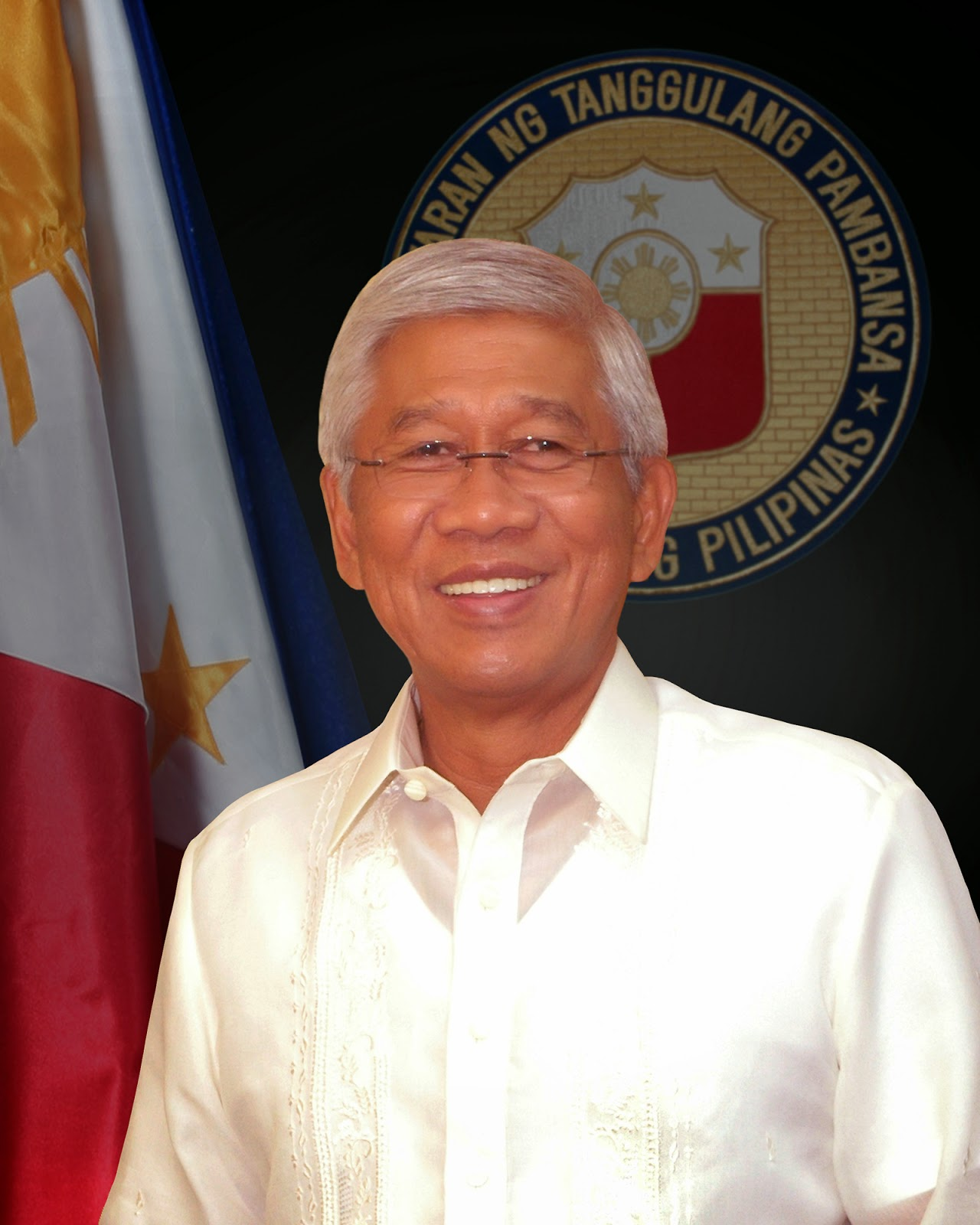
- Gazmin in 2013 portrait

25th Secretary of National Defense
- In office June 30, 2010 – June 30, 2016
- President: Benigno S. Aquino III
- Preceded by: Norberto Gonzales
- Succeeded by: Delfin Lorenzana

Philippine Ambassador to Cambodia
- In office May 1, 2002 – June 30, 2004
- President: Gloria Macapagal-Arroyo

Commanding General of the Philippine Army
- In office July 13, 1999 – October 22, 2000
- President: Joseph Ejercito Estrada
- Preceded by: Lt. Gen. Angelo T. Reyes
- Succeeded by: Lt. Gen. Diomedio P. Villanueva

Commander AFP Special Operations Command
- In office 1997–1999
- President: Joseph Ejercito Estrada
- Preceded by: Job Mayo
- Succeeded by: Dionisio Santiago

Commander of Philippine Presidential Security Group
- In office March 1, 1986 – June 29, 1992
- President: Corazon Aquino
- Preceded by: Fabian Ver
- Succeeded by: Ismael Z. Villareal

Personal details
- Born: Voltaire Tuvera Gazmin; October 22, 1944 (age 81) Moncada, Tarlac, Philippines
- Spouse: Rhodora H. Gazmin
- Education: Philippine Military Academy
- Profession: Soldier
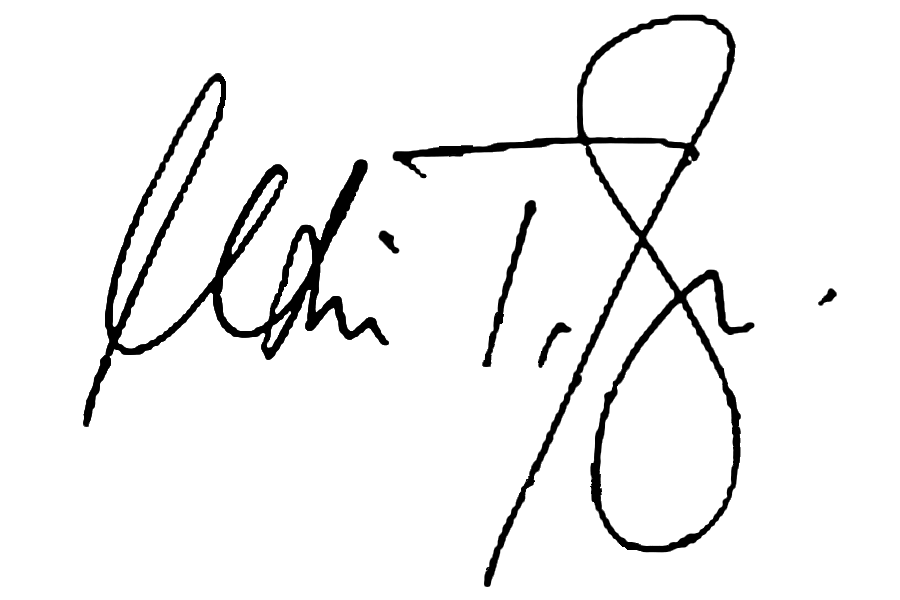
- Signature
- Website: http://www.dnd.gov.ph

Military service
- Allegiance: Republic of the Philippines
- Branch/service: Philippine Army
- Years of service: 1968–2000
- Rank: Lieutenant General

Voltaire Tuvera Gazmin (born 22 October 1944) is a retired Filipino soldier who was the 35th Secretary of the Department of National Defense of the Philippines. Gazmin assumed office on 1 July 2010, after President Benigno S. Aquino III had issued the former's appointment the day before.

In 2012, Gazmin attended a meeting with the Commandant of the U.S. Marine Corps, General James F. Amos. General Amos also met with the Chief of Staff of the Armed Forces of the Philippines, General Jessie D. Dellosa, during his visit.

Gazmin emerged from a nearly six-year hiatus from public office after last serving as the Philippine Ambassador to Cambodia from 2002 to 2004. For nearly 32 years, he was a career officer in the Philippine Army, retiring as a Lieutenant General and after serving as the 40th Commanding General of the Philippine Army until 2000.

He first gained national prominence in 1986 as the loyal and disciplinarian Commander of the Presidential Security Group (PSG), defiantly defending the government of President Corazon C. Aquino from seven 'coup attempts during her six-year term. Gazmin was honored multiple times in his military career for his skills in intelligence gathering and effectively commanding troops in some of the most difficult operations and for a long-term vision in administrative matters. His disciplinary demeanour has earned him the respect of his peers and junior officers and staff as a military officer and as a civilian.

== Early life and profile ==
Gazmin was born on October 22, 1944, in the town of Moncada, Tarlac (95 kilometers north of Manila), to Brig. Gen. Segundo L. Gazmin Sr., PA and Petra T. Gazmin. His father also had a distinguished career in the Philippine Army, and was a survivor of the Bataan Death March during the Second World War before joining the now-defunct Philippine Constabulary.

Gazmin spent his first two years in college at the University of the Philippines Diliman by taking up a course in Chemistry until he later decided to bid for a slot at the Philippine Military Academy.

He was successfully admitted into the academy at the start of the school year in 1964 and graduating on March 24, 1968, choosing to serve in the Philippine Army.

=== Educational background ===
Gazmin started with his primary education at St. Paul College in 1949. He would later pursue his elementary education the University of the Philippines Integrated School in 1954 and his secondary education at the University of the Philippines High School in 1958.

He would spend two years at the University of the Philippines taking up Bachelor of Science in Chemistry before being admitted to the Philippine Military Academy in 1964.

== Military career ==
He first became Team Leader of the Home Defense Forces Group (Airborne) at the Army Special Warfare Brigade based in Fort Magsaysay, Nueva Ecija province.

He also served as intelligence officer for various units of the Army and also distinguished himself during the brief insurgency war in Mindanao.

=== As an Army General ===
Gazmin would earn his first star and hold the title Brigadier General after nearly six years of distinguished service as Commander of the Presidential Security Group. He would later get appointed as Defense and Armed Forces attaché at the Philippines’ Embassy in Washington, D.C.

After his tour overseas, he would serve as Brigade Commander of the 3rd Infantry Brigade, 1st Infantry division based in Isabela, Basilan province. In 1996, Regimental Commander, Special Forces Regiment (Airborne) Special Operation Command, Commander, Special Operations Command (SOCOM) – commander of the 103rd Infantry Brigade – 1st Infantry (Tabak) Division.

In September 1998, Gazmin was appointed Commander of the Southern Luzon Command (SOLCOM) – the Special Forces Regiment (Airborne) and later the Special Operations Command of the Philippine Army in 1997, and the Southern Luzon Command in 1998.

=== Commanding General of the Philippine Army ===
He would assume the post as the 40th Commanding General of the Philippine Army upon the appointment of President Joseph Estrada on July 13, 1999, and would retire as a Lieutenant General on his 56th birthday on October 22, 2000, the mandatory age of retirement for officers in the Philippines’ military.

=== Military awards and commendations ===
Gazmin was awarded the Philippine Legion of Honor, three Distinguished Conduct Star, three Distinguished Service Star, one Gold cross medal, one Bronze Cross medal, eleven Military Merit medals, one Military Commendation medal, four Long Service medals, four Combat Commander's Kagitingan badges, seven Anti-Dissidence campaign medals & ribbons.

As an Army commander, he would also receive the following awards; nine Luzon Anti-Dissidence campaign medals & ribbons, seven Visayas Anti-Dissidence campaign medals & ribbons, eight Anti-Dissidence campaign medals & ribbons, one Presidential citation badge, two Philippine Army command plaque in 1997 & 1998, one American Legion Citation of Appreciation, one AFP parachutist badge and countless number of Letter of Commendations.

=== Relationship with the Aquino family ===
On December 21, 1969, then-Lieutenant Gazmin married his long-time fiancée, Rhodora Hernández, with Senator Benigno S. Aquino Jr. serving as principal sponsor. Like Gazmin, Senator Aquino was also born and raised in Tarlac.

When Ferdinand Marcos, the 10th president of the Philippines, declared martial law on September 21, 1972, Senator Aquino and several high-ranking politicians from the opposition were arrested and imprisoned. Aquino and Senator José W. Diokno were secretly transferred from Fort Bonifacio in Taguig to Fort Ramón Magsaysay in Laur, Nueva Ecija.

Aquino would continue his seven years of imprisonment in Laur, coincidentally having Gazmin as jailer at the detention facility. Gazmin at the time was District Commander of the 1st Military Service Detachment, Military Service Unit of the Army. Adhering to his oath as a professional soldier, and following conditions set under Martial Law, Gazmin discreetly monitored Aquino's status and welfare. He would extend courtesies to Aquino's wife, Corazon, when she visited her husband. During Senator Aquino's 40-day hunger strike, Gazmin would secretly bring milk to the detention cell and oversee the solon's daily medical check-up.

President Marcos later granted Senator Aquino permission to travel to the United States for a much-needed heart operation on May 8, 1980. Aquino would return to the Philippines on August 21, 1983, only to be assassinated at the tarmac of the airport now bearing his name. The President in November 1985 later called for a snap election, and a widowed Corazon Aquino, petitioned by the masses, to run against him under a united opposition. Gazmin was still on assignment in Mindanao when the People Power Revolution overthrew the Marcos government and installed Corazon Aquino as the 11th President on February 25, 1986.

President Aquino called on Gazmin to head her security entourage and to command the newly organized Presidential Security Group. As commander of the PSG, then-Lt. Colonel Gazmin helped defend President Aquino's government from at least seven coups d'etat, ending in December 1989, marked as the most bloodiest attempt to overthrow the democratic government of Aquino.

Gazmin kept close ties to Mrs. Aquino and the rest of her family members while he returned to the Philippine Army and even after he disappeared from public view when he completed his tour of duty as Ambassador to Cambodia in 2004.

On August 1, 2009, the day Aquino died after a year-and-a-half battle against colorectal cancer, Gazmin and several senior military officials who served as her presidential security detail paid their last respects to their former Commander-in-Chief. Gazmin served as a pallbearer for Aquino's casket during services at Manila Cathedral.

When Aquino's only son, then-Senator Benigno Aquino III, started his campaign for the presidency in early 2010, Gazmin was one of the security consultants for the campaign sorties. Gazmin's long standing integrity in service, professionalism and his distinguished loyalty to the Aquino family resulted in his temporary departure from retirement, to be called again to public service as Secretary of National Defense when Aquino assumed office on June 30, 2010.

== Defense Secretary ==
Voltaire Gazmin returned to the public eye as the Defense secretary of President Benigno Aquino III.

Gazmin started his term as Defense secretary with a commitment towards transparency and expediting processes without cutting corners. His designation as Defense secretary was confirmed by the 24-member Commission on Appointments on February 23, 2011.

=== Programs and policies ===
Modernization of the Armed Forces of the Philippines - Under Gazmin's watch, the long overdue modernization of the Armed Forces of the Philippines was being given a priority. The 15 year AFP Modernization Act of 1995 would expire as a law in 2011 including the allocations for the modernization but under the Aquino administration, a P42 Billion 5-year program was introduced that would give the AFP its long overdue hardware upgrade.

Establishing a Lasting Peace - At the on-set of his term of office, Gazmin pledged support for the Aquino government's initiative to resume peace talks with the communist insurgents and the Moro Islamic Liberation Front.

He would implement President Aquino's directives to appoint and install new commanders in the various military positions including a complete over haul of the senior officers of the Armed Forces including the post of Chief-of-Staff. The directive would result in controversies against the Aquino government of removing officials appointed by former President Gloria Arroyo to favor a different batch of officers from the Philippine Military Academy.

Senior defense officials and from the Armed Forces of the Philippines announced that they will visit the disputed Kalayaan Group of islands to check possible improvements of the facilities.

Preceded by Norberto Gonzales	Secretary of National Defense; 2010 – 2016	Succeeded by Delfin Lorenzana
