= Tabak =

Tabak is a surname and may refer to:

- Benny Tabak (born 1956), former Israeli footballer
- David Tabak (1927–2012), Israeli Olympic runner
- Jiří Tabák (born 1955), retired Czech gymnast
- Lawrence A. Tabak, American dentist and biomedical scientist
- Mirjana Tabak (born 1972), Croatian former female professional basketball player
- Noortje Tabak (born 1988), former Dutch road cyclist
- Romana Tabak (born 1991), Slovak professional tennis player
- Ronald Tabak (disambiguation)
- Tino Tabak, Dutch-born New Zealand cyclist
- Vincent Tabak, Dutch engineer and convicted murderer
- Žan Tabak (born 1970), Croatian basketball player

== See also ==
- Tabak Division, official name of the 1st Infantry Division, Philippine Army
- Tabak-Toyok, a Filipino flail weapon consisting of a pair of sticks connected by a chain
