= Secretary of National Defense (Philippines) =

Cabinet position in the Philippines

- Kalihim ng Tanggulang Pambansa
- Official seal of the Department of National Defense

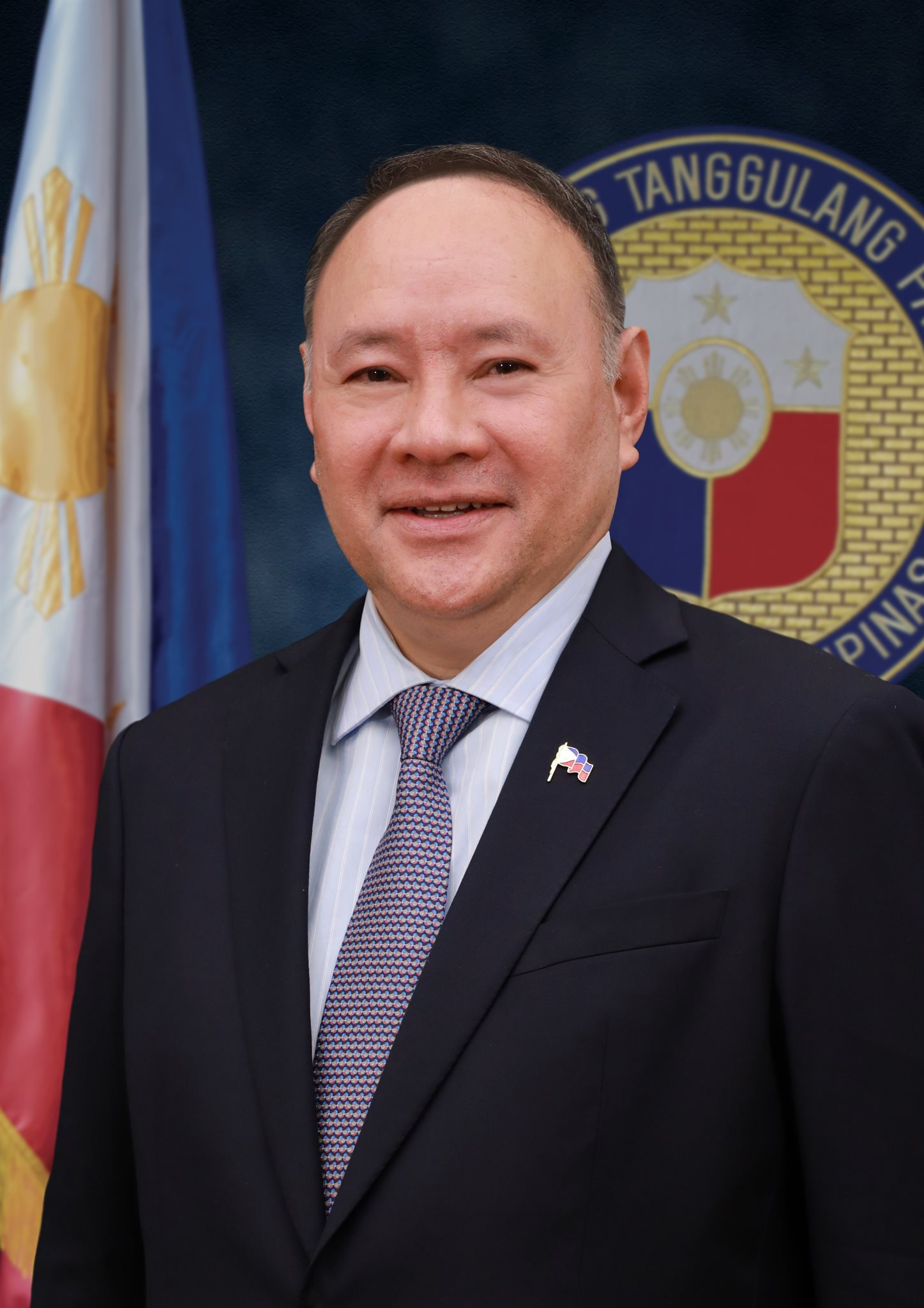
- Incumbent; Gilbert Teodoro since June 5, 2023
- Style: The Honorable
- Member of: Cabinet, National Security Council
- Reports to: President of the Philippines
- Appointer: The president with Commission on Appointments confirmation
- Precursor: Secretary of War
- Formation: November 1, 1939
- First holder: Teófilo Sison
- Website: dnd.gov.ph

The Secretary of national defense (Filipino: Kalihim ng Tanggulang Pambansa) is the head of the Department of National Defense of the Philippines and a member of the president's Cabinet.

The current secretary is former Philippine House representative of Tarlac's 1st congressional district, Gilbert Teodoro. He assumed office on June 5, 2023 and has previously served the same position under the presidency of Gloria Macapagal Arroyo from August 2007 to November 2009.

Historically, this cabinet position has been a stepping stone to the Philippine presidency. Two previous secretaries of national defense were elected president: Ramon Magsaysay and Fidel Ramos. Several others ran for the presidency: Alejo Santos, Juan Ponce Enrile, Renato de Villa, Norberto Gonzales, and Gilbert Teodoro.

== Powers and functions ==
The 1987 Executive Order No. 292 gives the national defense secretary executive supervision of the Armed Forces of the Philippines, the Office of Civil Defense, the Philippine Veterans Affairs Office, the National Defense College of the Philippines, and the Government Arsenal.

== List of national defense secretaries ==
=== Director of War (1897) ===
Portrait	Name (Birth–Death)	Took office	Left office	President
	Emiliano Riego de Dios	March 22, 1897	November 1, 1897	Emilio Aguinaldo

=== Secretary of War (1897) ===
Portrait	Name (Birth–Death)	Took office	Left office	President
	Emiliano Riego de Dios	November 1, 1897	December 15, 1897	Emilio Aguinaldo

=== Secretary of War and Navy (1898–1899) ===
Portrait	Name (Birth–Death)	Took office	Left office	President
	Baldomero Aguinaldo (1869–1915)	July 15, 1898	May 7, 1899	Emilio Aguinaldo

=== Secretary of War (1898–1899) ===
Portrait	Name (Birth–Death)	Took office	Left office	President
	Mariano Trías (1868–1914)	May 7, 1899	November 13, 1899	Emilio Aguinaldo

=== Secretary of National Defense (1939–1941) ===
Portrait	Name (Birth–Death)	Took office	Left office	President
	Teófilo Sison (1880–1975)	November 1, 1939	July 15, 1941	Manuel L. Quezon
	Manuel L. Quezon (Note: Served in concurrent capacity as the President.) (1878–1944); Acting	July 16, 1941	December 11, 1941	Manuel L. Quezon
	Jorge B. Vargas (1890–1980); Acting	December 11, 1941	December 22, 1941	Manuel L. Quezon

=== Secretary of National Defense, Public Works, Communications, and Labor (1941–1945) ===
Portrait	Name (Birth–Death)	Took office	Left office	President
	Basilio Valdes (1892–1970)	December 23, 1941	February 26, 1945	Manuel L. Quezon
	Basilio Valdes (1892–1970)	December 23, 1941	February 26, 1945	Sergio Osmeña
	Tomas Cabili (1903–1957)	February 27, 1945	July 11, 1945	Sergio Osmeña

=== Secretary of National Defense (1945–1978) ===
Portrait	Name (Birth–Death)	Took office	Left office	President
	Alfredo Montelibano Sr. (1905–1989)	July 12, 1945	May 27, 1946	Sergio Osmeña
	Ruperto Kangleon (1890–1958)	May 28, 1946	August 31, 1950	Manuel Roxas
	Ruperto Kangleon (1890–1958)	May 28, 1946	August 31, 1950	Elpidio Quirino
	Ramon Magsaysay (1907–1957)	September 1, 1950	February 28, 1953	Elpidio Quirino
	Oscar Castelo (1903–1982); Acting	March 1, 1953	December 30, 1953	Elpidio Quirino
	Ramon Magsaysay (1907–1957); Acting	January 1, 1954	May 14, 1954	Ramon Magsaysay
	Sotero Cabahug (1891–1963)	May 14, 1954	January 2, 1956	Ramon Magsaysay
	Eulogio Balao (1907–1977)	January 3, 1956	August 28, 1957	Ramon Magsaysay
	Eulogio Balao (1907–1977)	January 3, 1956	August 28, 1957	Carlos P. Garcia
	Jesus Vargas (1905–1994)	August 28, 1957	May 18, 1959	Carlos P. Garcia
	Alejo Santos (1911–1984)	June 11, 1959	December 30, 1961	Carlos P. Garcia
	Macario Peralta Jr. (1913–1975)	January 1, 1962	December 30, 1965	Diosdado Macapagal
	Ferdinand Marcos (1917–1989); Acting	December 31, 1965	January 20, 1967	Ferdinand Marcos
	Ernesto Mata (1915–2012)	January 21, 1967	February 3, 1970	Ferdinand Marcos
	Juan Ponce Enrile (1924–2025)	February 9, 1970	August 27, 1971	Ferdinand Marcos
	Ferdinand Marcos (1917–1989); Acting	August 28, 1971	January 3, 1972	Ferdinand Marcos
	Juan Ponce Enrile (1924–2025)	January 4, 1972	June 2, 1978	Ferdinand Marcos

=== Minister of National Defense (1978–1987) ===
Portrait	Name (Birth–Death)	Took office	Left office	President
	Juan Ponce Enrile (1924–2025)	June 2, 1978	November 23, 1986	Ferdinand Marcos
	Juan Ponce Enrile (1924–2025)	June 2, 1978	November 23, 1986	Corazon Aquino
	Rafael Ileto (1920–2003)	November 23, 1986	February 11, 1987	Corazon Aquino

=== Secretary of National Defense (from 1987) ===
Portrait	Name (Birth–Death)	Took office	Left office	President
	Rafael Ileto (1920–2003)	February 11, 1987	January 21, 1988	Corazon Aquino
	Fidel V. Ramos (1928–2022)	January 22, 1988	July 18, 1991	Corazon Aquino
	Renato de Villa (born 1935)	July 20, 1991	September 15, 1997	Corazon Aquino
	Renato de Villa (born 1935)	July 20, 1991	September 15, 1997	Fidel V. Ramos
	Fortunato Abat (1925–2018)	September 16, 1997	June 30, 1998	Fidel V. Ramos
	Orly Mercado (born 1946)	June 30, 1998	January 25, 2001	Joseph Estrada
	Orly Mercado (born 1946)	June 30, 1998	January 25, 2001	Gloria Macapagal Arroyo
	Eduardo Ermita (1935–2025); Acting	January 26, 2001	March 19, 2001	Gloria Macapagal Arroyo
	Angelo Reyes (1945–2011)	March 19, 2001	August 29, 2003	Gloria Macapagal Arroyo
	Gloria Macapagal Arroyo (born 1947); Acting	September 1, 2003	October 2, 2003	Gloria Macapagal Arroyo
	Eduardo Ermita (1935–2025)	October 3, 2003	August 24, 2004	Gloria Macapagal Arroyo
	Avelino Cruz	August 25, 2004	November 30, 2006	Gloria Macapagal Arroyo
	Gloria Macapagal Arroyo (born 1947); Acting	November 30, 2006	February 1, 2007	Gloria Macapagal Arroyo
	Jun Ebdane (born 1948)	February 1, 2007	July 2, 2007	Gloria Macapagal Arroyo
	Norberto Gonzales (born 1947); Acting	July 2, 2007	August 6, 2007	Gloria Macapagal Arroyo
	Gilbert Teodoro (born 1964)	August 7, 2007	November 16, 2009	Gloria Macapagal Arroyo
	Norberto Gonzales (born 1947)	November 16, 2009	June 30, 2010	Gloria Macapagal Arroyo
	Voltaire Gazmin (born 1944)	June 30, 2010	June 30, 2016	Benigno Aquino III
	Delfin Lorenzana (born 1948)	June 30, 2016	June 30, 2022	Rodrigo Duterte
	Jose Faustino Jr. (born 1965); Acting	June 30, 2022	January 9, 2023	Bongbong Marcos
	Carlito Galvez Jr. (born 1962); Acting	January 9, 2023	June 5, 2023	Bongbong Marcos
	Gilbert Teodoro (born 1964)	June 5, 2023	Incumbent	Bongbong Marcos
