= Western Mindanao Command =

Philippine Military's unified branch command for Western Mindanao

Coordinates: 6°55′4.52″N 122°2′28.16″E

- Active: August 28, 2006 - Present
- Country: Philippines
- Role: Conventional and Unconventional Warfare, Anti-Guerrilla Operations
- Part of: Under the Armed Forces of the Philippines
- Garrison/HQ: Camp General Basilio Navarro, Zamboanga City
- Nickname: WestMinCom
- Mottos: Kapayapaan; Peace
- Anniversaries: August 28
- Engagements: Anti-guerilla operations against the NPA, MILF, ASG, and local criminal elements

Commanders
- Current commander: LtGen. Donald M. Gumiran, PA
- Notable commanders: LtGen. Eugenio Cedo, AFP; LtGen. Nelson Allaga, AFP; LtGen. Carlito G. Galvez Jr., AFP; LtGen. Cirilito E. Sobejana, AFP

Insignia
- Unit Patch: Western Mindanao Command Emblem

The Western Mindanao Command (abbrv. as WESTMINCOM) is the Armed Forces of the Philippines' unified command in charge of the Zamboanga Peninsula, Northern Mindanao, and the Bangsamoro Autonomous Region in Muslim Mindanao. It is responsible for the defense of these areas against external aggression, as well as combating terrorism and insurgency. It is also one of the government organizations advocating the "Culture of Peace" in Mindanao.

== Organization ==
The following are the units that are under the Western Mindanao Command.

- 1st Infantry Division, Philippine Army
- 6th Infantry Division, Philippine Army
- Air Combat Command, Philippine Air Force
- Western Mindanao Naval Command, Philippine Navy

== Operations ==
- Anti-guerrilla operations against the New People's Army.
- Anti-terrorist operations against the Abu Sayyaf operating in their AOR.
- Anti-terrorist operations against Islamic State of Iraq and the Levant in the Battle of Marawi.

== Commanders ==
- LtGen. Eugenio V. Cedo, AFP (28 August 2006 – 5 September 2007)
- LtGen. Nelson N. Allaga, AFP (5 September 2007 – 16 July 2009)
- LtGen. Benjamin M. Dolorfino, AFP (16 July 2009 – 10 November 2010)
- LtGen. Raymundo B. Ferrer, AFP (10 November 2010 – 22 January 2012)
- LtGen. Noel A. Coballes, AFP (22 January 2012 – 22 October 2012)
- LtGen. Rey C. Ardo, AFP (22 October 2012 – 8 November 2013)
- LtGen. Rustico O. Guerrero, AFP (8 November 2013 – 24 November 2015)
- LtGen. Mayoralgo M. Dela Cruz, AFP (24 November 2015 – 17 January 2017)
- LtGen. Carlito G. Galvez Jr., AFP (17 January 2017 – 18 May 2018)
- LtGen. Arnel B. Dela Vega, AFP (18 May 2018 – 28 June 2019)
- LtGen. Cirilito E. Sobejana, AFP (28 June 2019 – 18 August 2020)
- LtGen. Corleto S. Vinluan Jr., AFP (18 August 2020 – 24 August 2021)
- MGen. Generoso M. Ponio, PA (24 August 2021 – 23 September 2021) (acting)
- LtGen. Alfredo V. Rosario Jr., PA (23 September 2021 – 4 October 2022)
- BGen. Arturo G. Rojas, PN(M) (4 October 2022 – 20 January 2023) (acting)
- LtGen. Roy M. Galido, AFP (20 January 2023 – 26 August 2023)
- MGen.Steve D Crespillo, AFP (26 August 2023 – 3 November 2023)
- Lt.Gen. William N. Gonzales PA (3 November 2023 – 20 November 2024)
- Lt.Gen. Antonio G. Nafarrete PA (20 November 2024 – 31 July 2025)
- BGen. Romulo D. Quemado II, PN(M) (31 July 2025 – 20 October 2025) (acting)
- MGen. Donald M Gumiran, PA (20 October 2025 – present)

== Gallery ==
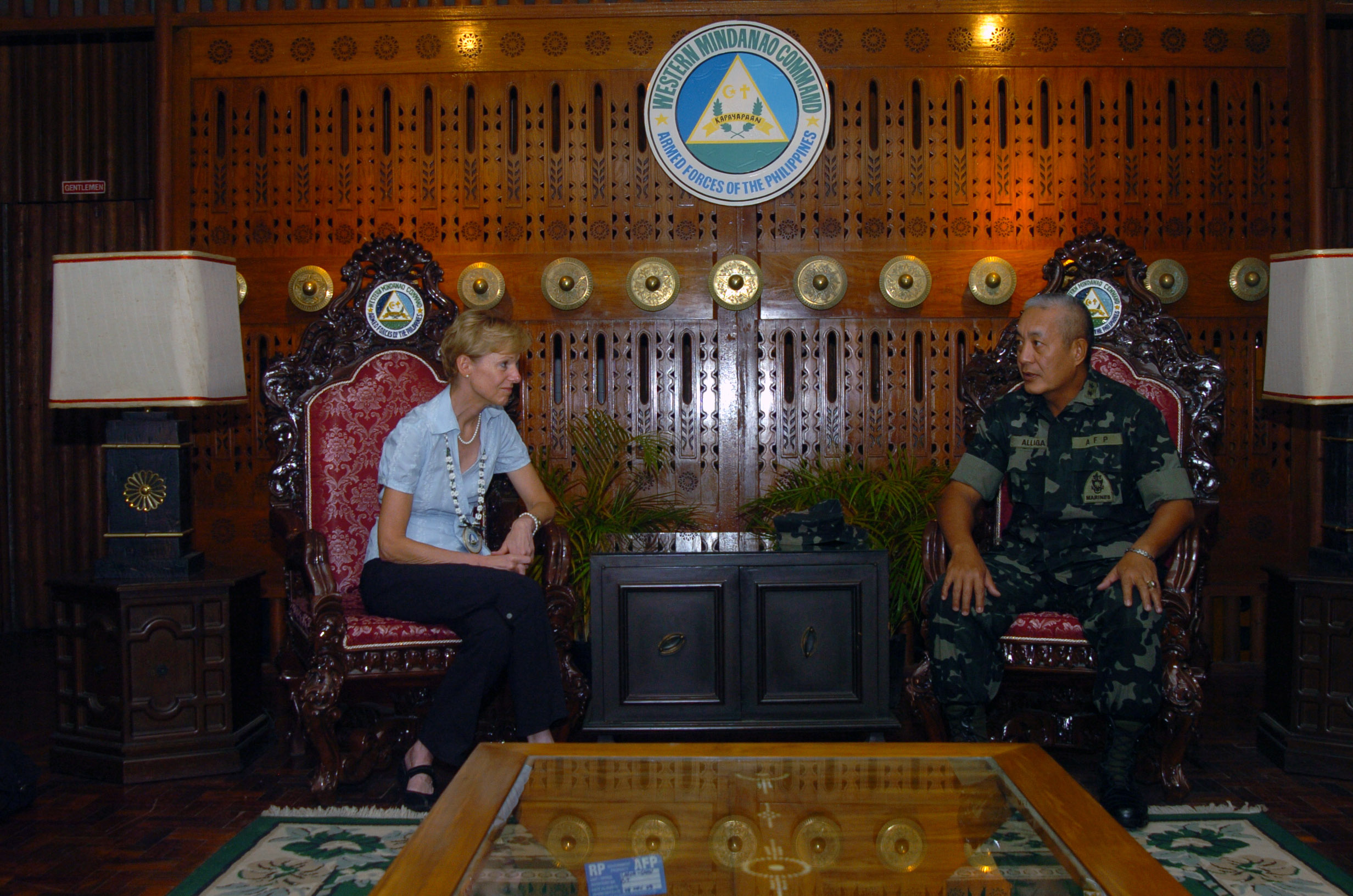
U.S. Ambassador for the Republic of the Philippines, Kristie A. Kenney, meets with Western Mindanao Command Chief Major General Nelson Allaga
