= Ronald Tabak =

Ronald Tabak may refer to:

- Ronald John Tabak (1953–1984), former vocalist in band Prism; see Prism (band)#Death of Ron Tabak and Medical Legacy
- Ronald J. Tabak (fl. 1990s), American attorney and critic of William Henry Hance's death sentence; see William Henry Hance#Controversy
