= Combat Commander's Badge (Philippines) =

Combat Commander's (Kagitingan) Badge
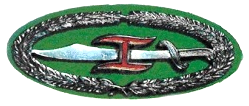
- Type: Military Badge
- Awarded for: Gallantry during a command.
- Description: The badge is ovate in shape and a Tagalog alphabet K in red is placed at the center of the badge superimposing a tabak with its blade in silver and its handle in black, placed in horizontal position. Surrounding the tabak are two tendrils of laurel leaves in elliptical pattern. The background of the badge is moss green and its center is a yellow stripe(s).
- Presented by: The Republic of the Philippines
- Eligibility: Military Personnel
- Clasps: maybe awarded to all other personnel from the PAF, PN, and PMC who have been assigned to units engaged in combat, combat support, combat support operations for at least one cumulative year,
- Status: Currently Awarded
- First award: 1986
- Final award: Ongoing

The Combat Commander's Kagitingan (K) Badge is awarded by the Commanding General, PA to PA officers and enlisted personnel who have commanded combat and combat support units for at least one cumulative year; all other PA military personnel who have rendered at least one cumulative year of combat duty regardless of their assignment, including those engaged in combat service support operations. Corresponding honorary badges may maybe awarded to all other personnel from the PAF, PN, and PMC who have been assigned to units engaged in combat, combat support, combat support operations for at least one cumulative year, regardless of duty assignment or position.

== Description ==
The badge is ovate in shape and a Tagalog alphabet K in red is placed at the center of the badge superimposing a tabak with its blade in silver and its handle in black, placed in horizontal position. Surrounding the tabak are two tendrils of laurel leaves in elliptical pattern. The background of the badge is moss green and its center is a yellow stripe(s).

The letter K stands for "Kagitingan", the Filipino word for valor; red stands for bravery, tabak represents the traditional weapon used by the Filipino people in their struggle for freedom; silver blade stands for firm determination of the Filipinos; black handle represents the carabao horn which reflects the sturdiness of the character of the Filipino people; laurel leaves signify greatness; olive drab tendrils stand for field uniform used in combat; and bronze star indicated that the wearer is a recipient of a service medal earned in combat.

Depending on the category of the individual awards, a bronze or silver star(s) is/are placed on the badge, indicating that the wearer has been a recipient of the following military awards earned in combat: wounded personnel medal - one bronze star; military commendation medal - 2 bronze stars; military merit medal with bronze spearhead devise - three bronze star; gold cross - one silver star, distinguished conduct star - two silver stars; and medal for valor - three silver stars. The highest educational bronze or silver star(s) may be attached to combat commander's (K) badge provided that the corresponding medal was earned by a military person as a commander, regardless of level of command.

== Levels of Award ==
Accordingly, the badge has additional features corresponding to level of command:

1.) Squad Leader- The badge is the basic form with no combat award (without star)

2.) Platoon Leader and awardee of wounded personnel medal - The badge will have two gold stripes and one bronze star superimposed on the stripes.

3.) Tactical Brigade/Area Commander - One gold stripe.

4.) Company Commander and awardee of MCM for bravery - Three gold stripes and two bronze star.

5.) Division Commander/Separate Brigade Commander and awardee of distinguished conduct star - Two gold stripes and two silver stars.

6.) Battalion Commander and awardee of MMM with bronze spearhead Devise - Four gold stripes and three bronze stars.

7.) Unified Command Commander and awardee of medal of valor - Three gold stripes and three silver stars.

== See also ==
- Awards and decorations of the Armed Forces of the Philippines
- Combat Infantryman Badge
- Combat Action Badge
- Combat Medical Badge
