= Wounded Personnel Medal =

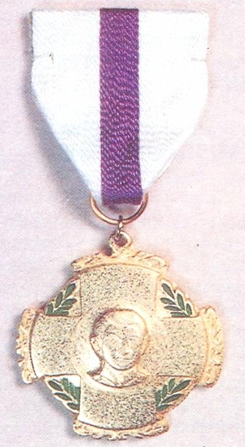
- The Wounded Personnel Medal
- Type: Medal
- Awarded for: receiving wounds while involved in actual combat with an enemy
- Presented by: the Republic of the Philippines
- Eligibility: Military Personnel of the AFP; Civilians of the Philippines serving with the AFP
- Status: Currently Awarded
- Established: October 6, 1947
- Service Ribbon

Precedence
- Next (higher): Silver Wing Medal
- Next (lower): Military Merit Medal

The Wounded Personnel Medal (WPM) is awarded to members of and civilians employed by the Armed Forces of the Philippines who are injured or killed in combat with the enemy.

== Requirements ==
For a candidate (military/civilian) to be eligible for the WPM, they must have been:

- wounded in action against an enemy of the Philippines, or as a direct result of an act of the enemy; provided that such wound necessitates treatment of a medical officer, or
- killed in action (KIA) against an enemy of the Philippines, or as a direct result of an act of the enemy

Not more than one award shall be made for more than one wound/injury received at the same instant (i.e. same missile, force explosion or agents). This is to say that the award is accorded to action (i.e. encounter), not to number/amount/gravity of the wound.

In the case of the recipient being KIA, the WPM shall be issued to their next of kin, entitling them to a posthumous award.

It is the Filipino equivalent to the US Armed Forces' Purple Heart. Its equivalent in the Philippine National Police is the Medalya ng Sugatang Magiting.

== Description ==
=== Obverse ===
The medal is in the form of a gold-plated bronze Greek cross, with ogee scrolls attached to each end of its arms (i.e. flanges). Superimposed in the center of the cross is a small disc where a relief head of Philippine revolutionary general Gregorio del Pilar is placed facing front. Another larger disk superimposes the cross, containing a laurel wreath; three pairs of leaves between the flanges.

The reverse of the WPM is plain.

=== Symbolism and Significance ===
==== Medal ====
- General Gregorio del Pilar - a Filipino general who is known for his last stand at the Battle of Tirad Pass against the Americans; in the context of the WPM, it symbolizes the achievements resulting to being wounded or killed in action, just as General del Pilar did
- Greek cross - risk of life while in combat
- Laurel wreath - honor for such endeavor
- Green color of laurel wreath - nobility; devotion to duty

==== Ribbon bar colors ====
- White - sincerity to service
- Purple - bravery in combat

=== Service Ribbon ===
The ribbon is white with purple stripe in the center.

There are no appurtenances authorized to be worn with the medal ribbon for the WPM, which means that the WPM is a one-time decoration, regardless of number of actions (and wounds) conducted and taken.

== See also ==
- Awards and decorations of the Armed Forces of the Philippines
