= AFP Southern Command =

Defunct Military unit of the Armed Forces of the Philippines

Coordinates: 6°55′4.52″N 122°2′28.16″E

- Active: 1976–2006
- Disbanded: August 6, 2006
- Country: Philippines
- Allegiance: Philippines; Armed Forces of the Philippines
- Type: Unified Command
- Role: Anti-Terrorism Anti-Dissidents; Search and Rescue Disaster Relief
- Size: 49,000
- Part of: Department of National Defense Armed Forces of the Philippines
- Garrison/HQ: Camp Basilio Navarro, Zamboanga City
- Nickname: SouthCom
- Equipment: M113 Armored Personnel Carriers FV101 Scorpion Light Tanks; V150 Commando Light Armored Vehicles; GKN Simba Light Armored Vehicles; M101 105mm Howitzers M114 155mm Howitzers
- Engagements: All-Out War against MILF(Operation Restore Fragile Peace) Siege of Lamitan Battle of Jolo

Commanders
- Notable commanders: Rear Admiral Romulo Espaldon Major General Delfin Castro; Lieutenant General Angelo Reyes; Lieutenant General Roy Cimatu; Lieutenant General Narciso Abaya Lieutenant General Generoso Senga

Aircraft flown
- Attack: OV10 Bronco
- Fighter: F5 Freedom; S211 Amaechi
- Helicopter: Bell 512; Bell 514
- Attack helicopter: MG-525 Defender Attack Helicopters; AH-S70 Spirit Attack Gunship Helicopters
- Cargo helicopter: C130 Hercules
- Multirole helicopter: UH-1H Huey Helicopters Bell 412 Bell 414
- Utility helicopter: UH-1H Huey Helicopters
- Patrol: C130 Hercules

AFP Southern Command (SouthCom) is a defunct unified command of the Armed Forces of the Philippines. It was the largest command under AFP during its existence. It covers entire island of Mindanao, the Sulu Archipelago, Celebes Sea, Sulu Sea, and Southern part of Philippine Sea. It gained highlight during the Abu Sayyaf kidnapping incidents and the all-out war against Moro Islamic Liberation Front (MILF).

It is responsible for the defense of these areas against external aggression, as well as combating terrorism and insurgency. It is also one of the government organizations advocating the "Culture of Peace" in Mindanao.

== History ==
This command was dealing with Moro conflict in late 1960s until mid 1990s with Moro National Liberational Front which are focused in Sulu Archipelago. A separate members of MNLF who were not in favor of the Tripoli Tripartite pact which launched another Moro Islamic Liberation Front in 1979 which are more located in Southern part of mainland Mindanao. Aside from moro secessional movements, southern command is also dealing with Communist Rebellion with CPP-NPA who are controlling the hinterlands in Northeastern. In order to deal with different front the government decided to split the command in order to focus solely on single front.

On August 6, 2006, Southern Command was split into two separate commands: Western Mindanao Command, and Eastern Mindanao Command, and it was disbanded.

== Organization ==
- 1st Infantry (Tabak) Division
- 4th Infantry (Diamond)Division
- 6th Infantry (Kampilan) Division
- 2nd Scout Ranger Battalion
- 1st Special Forces Battalion
- 1st Light Reaction Company
- 55th Engineering Brigade
- 3rd Air Division
- Naval Forces South
- 3rd Marine Brigade
- 4th Civil Relations Group, AFP

== Lineage of Commanders ==
- Lieutenant General Edilberto Adan (2005–2006)
- Lieutenant General Alberto Braganza (2004–2005)
- Lieutenant General Generoso Senga, PA (2003–2004)
- Lieutenant General Roy Kyamko, PA (2002–2003)
- Lieutenant General Narciso Abaya, PA (2003–2004)
- Lieutenant General Gregorio Camiling, PA (2002–2003)
- Lieutenant General Roy Cimatu, PA (2001–2002)
- Lieutenant General Ernesto Carolina, PA (2000–2001)
- Lieutenant General Edgardo Espinosa, PMC (1999–2000)
- Lieutenant General Diomedio Villanueva (1999–1999)
- Lieutenant General Angelo Reyes (1998–1999)
- Lieutenant General Joselin Nazareno (1997–1998)
- Lieutenant General Romeo Padiernos (1997)
- Lieutenant General Edgardo Batenga (1995–1997)
- Major General Regino Lacson (1993–1995)
- Major General Clemente Mariano (1991–1993)
- Major General Manuel Dizon (December 1986 - December 1988)
- Major General Jose Magno (February 1986 – December 1986)
- Major General Delfin Castro (1980–1986)
- Rear Admiral Romulo Espaldon, PN (1976–1980)

== See also ==
- Armed Forces of the Philippines
- AFP Western Mindanao Command
- AFP Eastern Mindanao Command
