= Edilberto Adan =

Former Commanding General of Philippines Southern Command

Commander AFP Southern Command
- In office 2005–2006
- President: Gloria Macapagal-Arroyo
- AFP Chief of Staff: Gen. Hermogenes EsperonJr, PA; Gen. Generoso Senga
- Preceded by: Alberto Braganza
- Succeeded by: Disbanded (August 6, 2006)

The Deputy Chief of Staff of the Armed Forces of the Philippines
- In office 2004–2005
- President: Gloria Macapagal-Arroyo
- AFP Chief of Staff: Gen. Generoso Senga; Gen. Angelo Reyes
- Preceded by: Narciso Abaya

Superintendent, Philippine Military Academy
- In office 2002–2004
- President: Gloria Macapagal-Arroyo
- Preceded by: Rufo A. De Veyra
- Succeeded by: Cristolito Balaoing Jr.

Personal details
- Education: Masters in Business Administration; Bachelor of Science Degree
- Alma mater: Asian Institute of Technology; Philippine Military Academy (1972)

Military service
- Branch/service: Philippine Army
- Years of service: 1972 - 2006
- Rank: Lieutenant General
- Unit: 101st Infantry Brigade; 81st Infantry Brigade
- Commands: AFP Southern Command The Deputy Chief of Staff, AFP; Superintendent, PMA Spokesperson, AFP

Edilberto Pardo Adan served as executive director with the rank of Undersecretary in the Presidential Commission on the Visiting Forces (PCFV) from 2007 to 2013 after retirement from the military service in 2006. He was a member of the Independent Commission Against Private Armies (Zenarosa Commission) in 2010. He retired from the Armed Forces of the Philippines in 2006 as Commanding General of the Southern Command (SouthCom) with the rank of Lieutenant General.

== Education ==
Adan obtained his bachelor's degree from the Philippine Military Academy in 1972. He finished his MBA degree in 1979 from the Asian Institute of Management and took strategic level studies as an International Fellow of the US Army War College (Class of 1996) in Pennsylvania. He attended courses in Asia Pacific Center for Security Studies in Hawaii, The George C. Marshall Center for Security Studies in Germany, and the Near East South Asia Center at the National Defense University in Washington D.C. He also studied conflict resolution at the U.S State Department, political warfare, and military operations in Australia. He has been a Fellow of the Institute for Corporate Directors since 2006.

== Military profile ==
Adan served key field and staff positions until his retirement as the Commander of the Southern Command. These include: The Deputy Chief of Staff of the Armed Forces of the Philippines (TDCSAFP) from 2004 to 2005; Superintendent, Philippine Military Academy from 2002 to 2004; Chief of the Civil Relations Service and Spokesman for the Armed Forces of the Philippines from 2001 to 2002; and Chief of Staff, Philippine Army. He commanded the 801 Inf Brigade in Northern Samar in central Philippines and the 101 Inf Brigade in Zamboanga peninsula, northwestern Mindanao.

== Post-military appointment ==
After Adan's retirement from the active service, he served as a member of the Board of Trustees of the Armed Forces and Police Savings and Loan Association Inc. In 2007 he was appointed by former President Gloria Macapagal Arroyo to be the executive director of the VFA Commission with the rank of Undersecretary, a post he served until 2014. As such, he was responsible for overseeing the implementation of the Visiting Forces Agreement between the Philippines and the United States and developing policy and legislative recommendations. He pushed for the Senate ratification of the Status of Visiting Forces Agreement between the Philippines and Australia.

In February 2010, he was given a concurrent appointment as a member of the Independent Commission Against Private Armies also known as the Zeñarosa Commission, after its chairman, retired Justice Monina Arevalo Zeñarosa. The commission had been established on December 8, 2009, in response to the November 23, 2009 Maguindanao massacre.

He became an independent director of a rural bank and a lending company. He joined the Philippine Council for Foreign Relations and is a member of the Philippine Constitution Association. He was elected as chairman and President of the Association of General and Flag Officers in 2013. Mighty Corporation, a tobacco manufacturing company, appointed him president in 2014.
