= 2011 Armed Forces of the Philippines corruption scandal =

The 2011 Armed Forces of the Philippines corruption scandal, also known as the "pabaon scandal", was a political scandal involving the alleged misuse of military funds by high-ranking members of the Armed Forces of the Philippines (AFP). The pabaon system referred to a practice of giving millions of pesos to chiefs of staff when they retire.

An estimated PHP1.5 billion in AFP funds for operations and salaries were allegedly placed anomalously in an unaudited pool of discretionary resources. Under the system, AFP general Carlos Garcia was alleged to have plundered PHP303 million as head of the comptroller's office while former AFP chief of staff Angelo Reyes was alleged to have received PHP50 million as send-off money.

The scandal led to the recommendation of filing of plunder charges against six retired generals and five other officers in January 2012. The Philippine Department of Justice named the following in its recommendation to the Office of the Ombudsman: AFP chiefs Roy Cimatu and Diomedio Villanueva; retired military comptrollers Garcia and Jacinto Ligot; retired major general Hilario Atendido; former brigadier general Benito de Leon; retired lieutenant colonel Ernesto Paranis; active-duty officers Cirilo Tomas Donato and Roy Devesa; former civilian auditor of Divina Cabrera; and former accountant Generoso del Castillo.

== Background ==
The Armed Forces of the Philippines (AFP) was embroiled in a corruption scandal in early 2011 after its former budget officer George Rabusa testified at a Senate Blue Ribbon Committee hearing on the pabaon (send-off money) system. The pabaon refers to the money given to a retiring chief of staff as send-off money. The money was siphoned from funds meant for salaries and operations and diverted to high-ranking officials and their spouses. The way the money was diverted was uncovered by Commission on Audit auditor Heidi Mendoza and became public when she testified before the House of Representatives Committee on Justice.

Generals Jacinto Ligot and Carlos Garcia, who were the AFP's comptrollers when the system was in place, were detained. Garcia pleaded guilty to the lesser offense of direct bribery and was not tried for plunder through a contentious plea bargain agreement that led to the impeachment of Ombudsman Merceditas Gutierrez.

Rabusa testified that every AFP chief of staff received send-off money, but all of them denied knowingly accepting it. Angelo Reyes, one of the accused recipients, committed suicide in March 2011 without having testified in the Senate or the House of Representatives regarding the pabaon scandal.

In March 2011, the armed forces was thought to be the most corrupt government agency according to a Pulse Asia survey.

== History ==
In 2003, a United States airport arrested General Carlos Garcia's sons for smuggling dollars, eventually leading to Garcia being charged with plunder in 2009. Garcia's wife Clarita and their sons Ian Carl, Timothy Mark, and Juan Paolo were charged with money laundering and plunder.

The Office of the Special Prosecutor under the Ombudsman withdrew its plunder case against Garcia. Through a plea bargain agreement, Garcia instead pleaded to the lesser offenses of money laundering and indirect bribery and was ordered return less than half of the PHP303 million he was accused of plundering. The plea bargain, which was kept secret by prosecutors, leaked to the public in December 2010, causing public outcry and prompting the Senate to hold an investigation.

== Rabusa's testimony ==
The House Committee on Justice and Senate Blue Ribbon Committee conducted hearings on the plea bargaining agreement of the Office of the Ombudsman and retired General Carlos Garcia who has a plunder suit in the Sandiganbayan (special court for government officials). On January 26, 2011, retired Col. George Rabusa exposed the alleged pabaon or send-off system in the military, which gives at least PHP50 million (USD1.1 million) to retiring chiefs of staff of the Armed Forces of the Philippines (AFP). Rabusa said he gave not less than 50 million pesos to Gen. Angelo Reyes when he retired.

On January 30, Rabusa further said that former AFP chiefs of staff Diomedio Villanueva and Roy Cimatu were also given send-off money. The payoffs, done monthly, were also given to the vice, deputy and secretary to the Joint Chiefs of Staff. Rabusa had been given by his comptrollers, Jacinto Ligot, then Carlos Garcia, discretion on how to utilize the provisions for command-directed activities (PCDA), and these were given as send-off money to the generals.

On the next Senate Blue Ribbon Committee hearing, Rabusa said that he delivered at least PHP160 million to Garcia, who ordered him to withdraw PHP10 million 16 times. Rabusa concluded that Garcia should have given it to Villanueva. Rabusa, who had kept copies of the Security Bank receipts, did so before the Anti-Money Laundering Act was put into force. Rabusa also included all AFP chiefs of staff, from his appointment as budget officer from 2000 until he left office as recipients of the alleged send-off money.

Rabusa also confessed to pocketing PHP50 million during his time as a budget officer from 2000 to 2002, and revealed that the generals' wives were also given money. Representative Gloria Macapagal Arroyo, who was president until 2010, stated that she did not have anything to do with the alleged corruption in the military. Five of the chiefs of staff, Narciso Abaya, Dionisio Santiago, Generoso Senga, Hermogenes Esperon, and Alexander Yano, denied receiving money, and denied that their wives used government money to spend on their overseas trips.

As a result of Rabusa's allegations, Senate President pro tempore Jinggoy Estrada (who presented Rabusa as a witness in the hearings), asked Ligot on the subsequent hearing, on his wife's alleged 42 overseas trips from 1993 to 2004; the retired general refused to answer and Estrada summoned Ligot's wife Erlinda at the next hearing. Rabusa also said that former Representative Prospero Pichay was given PHP1.5 million on Pichay's three visits to Villanueva's office. Pichay subsequently filed libel raps against Rabusa.

Villanueva, whose wife had just died, and Cimatu, who was then serving as special envoy to the Middle East, appeared on the Senate to deny that they received send-off money; Cimatu testified that his pabaon were his 40 medals and citations as a soldier. Cimatu's executive assistant, Brig. Gen. Benito de Leon, admitting receiving millions of pesos from Rabusa, but insisted that the transaction was legal. Rabusa replied that de Leon's statement was a "total lie."

== Mendoza's testimony ==
At a hearing of the House of Representatives Committee on Justice in late January 2011, former Commission on Audit (COA) auditor Heidi Mendoza testified that she uncovered irregularities in funds by the military. Among the irregularities she found involved a 200 million peso United Nations (UN) fund for operations and a US$5 million UN fund for equipment.

The AFP fund was split into three bank accounts: 50 million and 100 million pesos on United Coconut Planters Bank (UCPB), Alfaro Street, Makati, and another 50 million pesos at UCPB Tordesillas, Makati. The accounts at the Alfaro branch were covered by deposit slips, while the account on the Tordesillas branch was not recorded, despite the existence of a passbook. The UCPB Tordesillas branch manager wrote to Mendoza that there was a "cover-up" by the military in the transfer of the UN fund. While the PHP200 million originated at the AFP's trust fund at the Landbank EDSA-Greenhills branch was split into three accounts, the missing PHP50 million at the UCPB Tordesillas branch was a fresh deposit.

In the case of the missing US$5 million, the United States Department of Justice legal attaché asked her if she can be allowed to audit the UN reimbursements, as a certain US$5 million, which was personally picked up by a military officer in New York, was not reflected in the military's accounts. Former COA chairperson Guillermo Carague disapproved of Mendoza going to New York to investigate the matter. Two more accounts by the military, one each at General Santos and Iloilo City, which were used as clearing accounts for the UN funds, were discovered by Mendoza. Mendoza testified that Carague's orders not to pursue the cases disheartened her; Carague, Mendoza said, was given orders by the executive department, probably by the Executive Secretary.

In February 2011, Ferdinand Gaite of the Confederation for Unity, Recognition and Advancement of Government Employees lauded Mendoza for exposing alleged corruption in the Philippine military and for upholding "the dignity of rank-and-file employees in the government".

== Conviction ==
In 2022, Major General Carlos Garcia was sentenced to imprisonment by the Sandiganbayan anti-graft court for direct bribery, money laundering, perjury, and violation of articles of war by the General Court Martial of the AFP under Article 210, Revised Penal Code, Section 4 (b) of Republic Act 9160, and 96th and 97th Article of War by the General Court Martial of the Armed Forces of the Philippines. The court ordered Garcia to pay fines of PHP407 million.

In August 2023, DOJ Secretary Jesus Crispin Remulla approved the release of Garcia from the New Bilibid Prison after serving 12 years in jail from June 2005. He earned 3,288 good conduct time allowance (GCTA) credits.

In August 2024, Garcia filed a motion to nullify his P407.8 million unpaid fine. In September, the Sandiganbayan dismissed Garcia's motion and upheld the imposition of fines in the amount of P406.3 million for plunder and P1.5 million for direct bribery.

== See also ==
- Impeachment of Merceditas Gutierrez
- Armed Forces and Police Savings & Loan Association, Inc.
