= 15th Congress of the Philippines =

36th legislative term of the Philippines

←	14th	16th	→
- GSIS Building (2010) (top) and Batasang Pambansa Complex (2010) (bottom)

Overview
- Term: July 26, 2010 – June 6, 2013
- President: Benigno Aquino III
- Vice President: Jejomar Binay

Senate
- Members: 24
- President: Juan Ponce Enrile (until June 5, 2013); Jinggoy Estrada (acting, from June 5, 2013)
- President pro tempore: Jinggoy Estrada
- Majority leader: Tito Sotto
- Minority leader: Alan Peter Cayetano

House of Representatives
- Members: 286
- Speaker: Feliciano Belmonte Jr.
- Deputy Speakers: Beng Climaco; Raul Daza; Arnulfo Fuentebella; Pablo P. Garcia; Jesus Crispin Remulla; Erin Tañada
- Majority leader: Neptali Gonzales II
- Minority leader: Edcel Lagman (until January 20, 2012); Danilo Suarez (from January 20, 2012)

The 15th Congress of the Philippines (Filipino: Ikalabinlimang Kongreso ng Pilipinas), composed of the Philippine Senate and House of Representatives, met from July 26, 2010, until June 6, 2013, during the first three years of Benigno Aquino III's presidency. The convening of the 15th Congress followed the 2010 general elections, which replaced half of the Senate membership and the entire membership of the House of Representatives.

== Leadership ==
=== Senate ===
Senate President

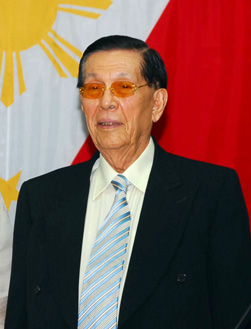
Juan Ponce Enrile,
until June 5, 2013

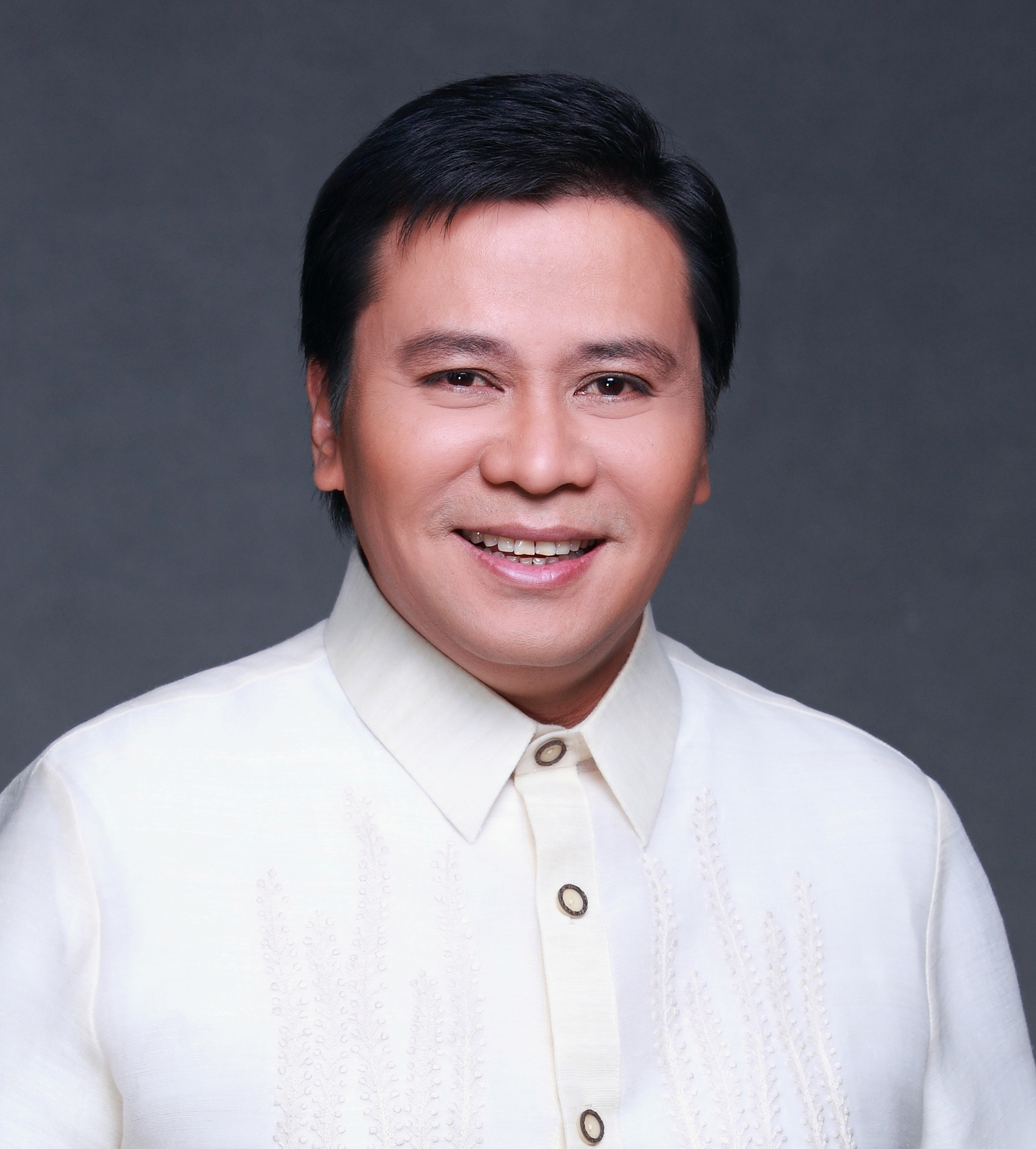
Jinggoy Estrada (acting),
from June 5, 2013

- President:
  - Juan Ponce Enrile (PMP), until June 5, 2013
  - Jinggoy Estrada (PMP), acting: from June 5, 2013
- President pro tempore: Jinggoy Estrada (PMP)
- Majority Floor Leader: Tito Sotto (NPC)
- Minority Floor Leader: Alan Peter Cayetano (Nacionalista)

=== House of Representatives ===
House Speaker

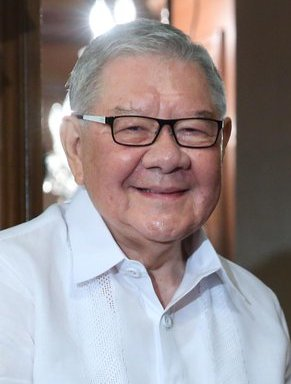
Feliciano Belmonte Jr.

- Speaker: Feliciano Belmonte Jr. (Quezon City–4th, Liberal)
- Deputy Speakers:
  - Beng Climaco (Zamboanga City–1st, Liberal)
  - Raul Daza (Northern Samar–1st, Liberal)
  - Arnulfo Fuentebella (Camarines Sur–3rd, NPC)
  - Pablo P. Garcia (Cebu–2nd, NUP)
  - Jesus Crispin Remulla (Cavite–7th, Nacionalista)
  - Erin Tañada (Quezon–4th, Liberal)
- Majority Floor Leader: Neptali Gonzales II (Mandaluyong–Lone, Liberal)
- Minority Floor Leader:
  - Edcel Lagman (Albay–1st, Lakas), until January 20, 2012
  - Danilo Suarez (Quezon–3rd, Lakas), from January 20, 2012

== Sessions ==
- First Regular Session: July 26, 2010 – June 6, 2011
- Second Regular Session: July 25, 2011 – June 6, 2012
- Third Regular Session: July 23, 2012 – June 5, 2013

== Party summary ==
=== Senate ===
Affiliation	Party (Majority/minority bloc/unclassified) (Shading indicates party has members in the majority bloc)										Total	
Affiliation	LDP	Lakas	LP	NP	NPC	PDP	PRP	PMP	Ind	B-VNP	Total	Vacant
End of 14th Congress	1 / 0	3 / 1	3 / 1	0 / 3	1 / 0	0 / 1	1 / 0	2 / 0	4 / 1	1 / 0	23	1
Election	1	4	5	4	2	0	1	2	5	0	24	0
June 30, 2010	1	4	4	4	2	0	1	2	5	0	23	1
July 25, 2010	1 / 0	2 / 1	4 / 0	2 / 2	2 / 0	1 / 0	0 / 1	2 / 0	2 / 2	0	23	1
August 2, 2010	1 / 0	2 / 1	4 / 0	2 / 2	2 / 0	1 / 0	0 / 1	2 / 0	4 / 0	0	23	1
August 4, 2010	1 / 0	2 / 1	4 / 0	2 / 2	2 / 0	1 / 0	1 / 0	2 / 0	4 / 0	0	23	1
August 3, 2011	1 / 0	2 / 1	4 / 0	2 / 2	2 / 0	1 / 0	1 / 0	2 / 0	4 / 0	0	22	2
August 15, 2011	1 / 0	2 / 1	4 / 0	2 / 2	2 / 0	1/0/1	1 / 0	2 / 0	4 / 0	0	23	1
August 17, 2011	1 / 0	2 / 1	4 / 0	2 / 2	2 / 0	2 / 0	1 / 0	2 / 0	4 / 0	0	23	1
May 10, 2012	1 / 0	2 / 1	4 / 0	2 / 2	2 / 0	2 / 0	1 / 0	3 / 0	3 / 0	0	23	1
July 8, 2012	1 / 0	2 / 1	4 / 0	3 / 2	2 / 0	2 / 0	1 / 0	3 / 0	2 / 0	0	23	1
September 21, 2012	1 / 0	2 / 1	4 / 0	2/2/1	2 / 0	2 / 0	1 / 0	3 / 0	2 / 0	0	23	1
September 23, 2012	1 / 0	2 / 1	4 / 0	2 / 3	2 / 0	2 / 0	1 / 0	3 / 0	2 / 0	0	23	1

=== House of Representatives ===
Affiliation	Party (Shading indicates party has members in the majority bloc; italicization indicates party has members from the minority bloc)																		Total	
Affiliation	Bil	BPP	CDP	KBL	LDP	Lakas	LM	LP	NP	NPC	NUP	PDP	PDSP	PMP	UNA	Ind	LT	PL	Total	Vacant
End of 14th Congress	0	—	—	0	1	123	1	30	24	25	—	5	0	2	—	4	1	53	269	3
Election	0	—	—	1	2	105	1	45	24	30	—	2	1	6	—	7	0	0	224	63
May 2010	0	—	—	1	2	105	1	45	24	30	—	2	1	6	—	7	0	35	259	28
June 25, 2010	0	—	—	1	1	96	1	66	23	31	—	2	0	5	—	2	0	35	263	24
July 22, 2010	0	—	—	1	1	95	1	66	23	31	—	2	0	5	—	2	0	35	262	25
July 25, 2010	0	—	—	1	1	89	1	73	22	30	—	2	0	5	—	2	0	39	265	22
August 2, 2010	0	—	—	1	1	89	1	73	22	30	—	2	0	5	—	2	0	44	270	17
September 1, 2010	0	—	—	1	1	89	1	73	22	30	—	2	0	5	—	2	0	46	272	15
September 7, 2010	0	—	—	1	1	89	1	73	22	30	—	2	0	5	—	2	0	47	273	14
September 21, 2010	0	—	—	1	1	89	1	73	22	30	—	2	0	5	—	2	0	50	276	11
September 27, 2010	0	—	—	1	1	89	1	73	22	30	—	2	0	5	—	2	0	53	279	8
October 7, 2010	0	—	—	1	1	89	1	73	22	30	—	2	0	5	—	2	0	54	280	7
November 22, 2010	0	—	—	1	1	90	1	73	22	30	—	2	0	5	—	2	0	54	281	6
November 30, 2010	0	—	—	1	1	91	1	73	22	30	—	2	0	5	—	2	0	54	282	5
January 17, 2011	0	—	—	1	1	91	1	73	22	30	—	2	0	5	—	2	0	55	283	4
February 4, 2011	0	—	—	1	1	61	1	73	22	30	30	2	0	5	—	2	0	55	283	4
March 7, 2011	0	—	—	1	1	60	1	73	22	30	30	2	0	5	—	2	0	56	283	4
March 16, 2011	0	—	—	1	1	61	1	73	22	30	30	2	0	5	—	2	0	56	284	3
May 30, 2011	1	—	—	1	1	61	1	73	22	30	30	2	0	5	—	2	0	56	285	2
July 25, 2011	1	—	—	1	1	57	1	74	21	29	35	2	0	5	—	2	0	56	286	1
August 3, 2011	1	—	—	1	1	57	0	74	21	29	35	2	0	5	—	2	0	56	285	2
August 30, 2011	1	—	—	1	1	54	0	74	21	30	37	2	0	5	—	2	0	56	285	2
December 31, 2011	1	—	—	1	1	54	0	74	21	30	37	2	0	5	—	2	0	55	284	3
January 19, 2012	1	—	—	1	1	53	0	74	21	30	37	2	0	5	—	3	0	55	284	3
January 26, 2012	1	—	—	1	1	52	0	74	21	30	37	2	0	5	—	3	0	55	283	4
February 13, 2012	1	—	—	1	1	52	1	74	21	30	37	2	0	5	—	3	0	55	284	3
April 16, 2012	1	—	—	1	1	52	1	73	21	30	37	3	0	5	—	3	0	55	284	3
May 4, 2012	1	—	—	1	1	52	1	74	21	30	36	3	0	5	—	3	0	55	284	3
May 25, 2012	1	—	—	1	1	51	1	74	21	30	36	4	0	5	—	3	0	55	283	4
May 29, 2012	1	—	—	1	1	51	1	74	21	30	36	4	0	5	—	3	0	54	282	5
May 31, 2012	1	—	—	1	1	50	1	74	21	30	36	4	0	5	—	3	0	54	281	6
June 4, 2012	1	—	—	1	1	50	1	75	21	30	36	4	0	5	—	3	0	54	282	5
August 13, 2012	1	—	—	1	1	50	1	74	21	30	36	4	0	5	—	3	0	54	281	6
October 9, 2012	1	—	—	1	1	50	1	74	21	30	36	4	0	5	—	3	0	55	282	5
October 10, 2012	1	—	—	1	1	50	1	74	21	30	36	4	0	5	—	3	0	56	283	4
October 18, 2012	1	—	—	1	1	50	1	73	21	30	36	4	0	5	—	3	0	56	282	5
November 5, 2012	0	1	1	1	1	28	1	91	18	44	27	0	0	0	11	4	0	56	282	5
December 25, 2012	0	1	1	1	1	28	1	91	18	43	27	0	0	0	11	4	0	56	281	6
March 19, 2013	0	1	1	1	1	28	1	90	18	43	27	0	0	0	11	4	0	56	280	7
April 24, 2013	0	1	1	1	1	27	1	90	18	43	27	0	0	0	11	4	0	56	279	8
Final voting share	0%	0%	0%	0%	0%	9%	0%	31%	6%	16%	10%	0%	0%	0%	4%	1%	0%	20%		

== Members ==
=== Party standing ===
==== Senate ====
Party standing and blocs

Party	Majority Bloc	Minority Bloc	Total	%
LDP	1	0	1	4.17%
Lakas	2	1	3	12.50%
Liberal	4	0	4	16.67%
Nacionalista	2	3	5	20.83%
NPC	2	0	2	8.33%
PDP–Laban	1	0	1	4.17%
PRP	1	0	1	4.17%
PMP	2	0	2	8.33%
Independents; Former NPC: 1, former UNO: 1, former LDP: 1, former PDP–Laban	4	0	4	16.67%
Totals	19	4	23	95.83%*

*for purposes of quorum and voting, the vacant seat is included.

==== House of Representatives ====
Party standing and blocs

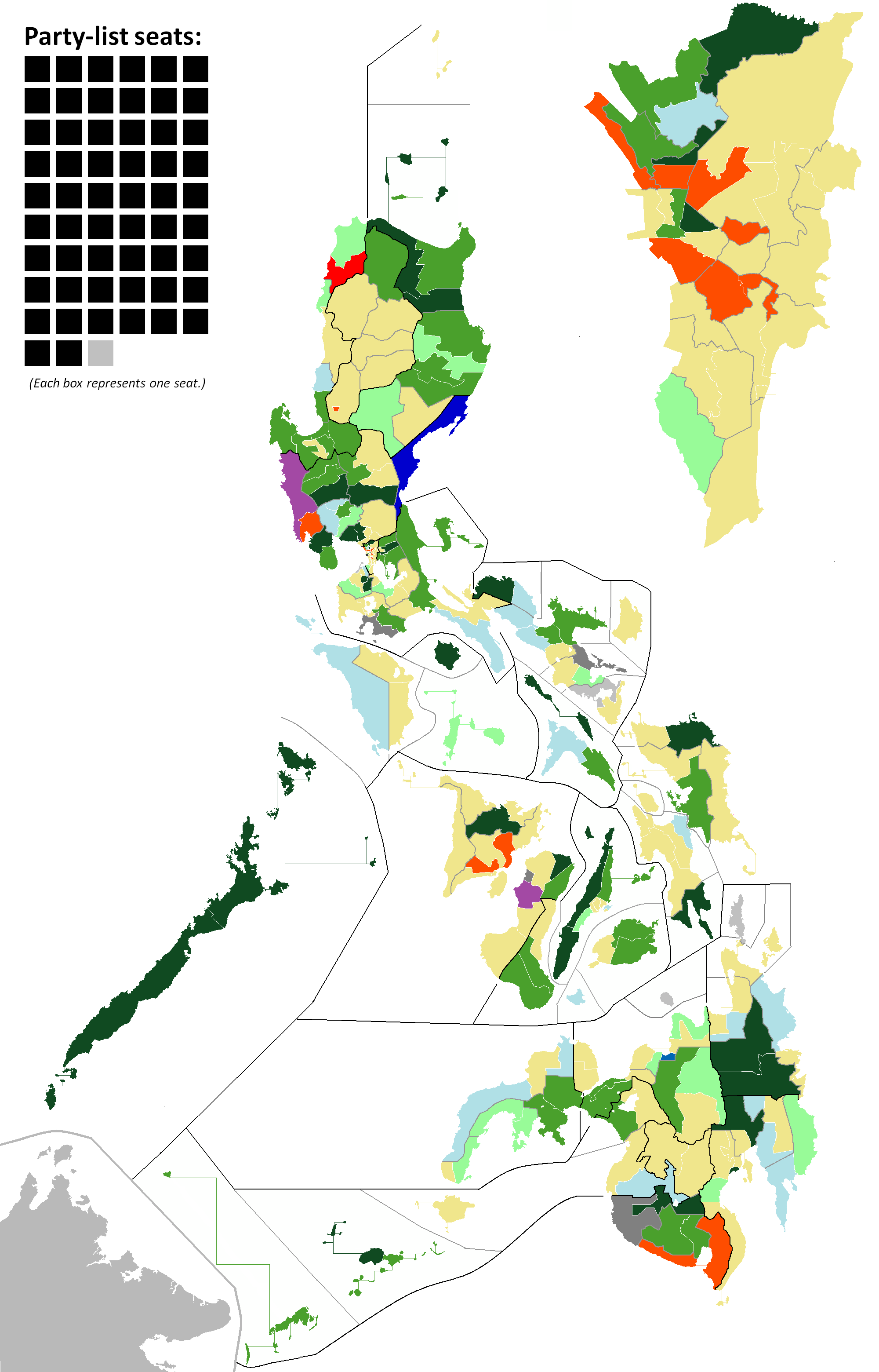
Final party standing.

Party	Majority Bloc	Ind.	Minority Bloc	Total	%
Bukidnon Paglaum	1	0	0	1	0.35%
CDP	1	0	0	1	0.36%
KABAKA	1	0	0	1	0.36%
KBL	1	0	0	1	0.36%
LDP	1	0	0	1	0.36%
Lakas	10	0	11	21	7.34%
Liberal	90	0	0	90	31.47%
Nacionalista	16	0	2	18	6.41%
NPC	38	0	5	43	15.30%
NUP	30	0	0	30	10.68%
LM	1	0	0	1	0.36%
UNA	9	1	1	11	3.91%
Independents	4	0	0	4	1.42%
Party-list	51	0	5	56	19.93%
Totals	254	1	24	279	100.00%*
Percent	88.81%	0.36%	39%	97.55%	

=== Memberships in committees and other bodies ===
- Note: Doesn't include oversight committees created for specific laws.

==== Commission on Appointments ====
The Senate President sits as the chair of the Commission on Appointments, who can only vote to break ties; the head of the contingent of the House of Representatives serves as the vice chairman and can vote not just only to break ties.

Chamber	Party	Chair/vice chair	Party	Minority leader
Senate	PMP	Juan Ponce Enrile	Lakas	Joker Arroyo
House of Representatives	Liberal	Roilo Golez	Lakas	Simeon Datumanong

==== Judicial and Bar Council ====
The chairs of the respective houses' committees of justice shall serve as ex officio members of the Judicial and Bar Council. The Chief Justice is the ex officio chairman, while the president appoints the members, with confirmation from the Commission on Appointments.

Chamber	Party	Name
Senate	Independent	Francis Escudero
House of Representatives	Liberal	Niel Tupas, Jr.

==== Electoral tribunals ====
The Senate Electoral Tribunal is composed of six senators and three justices of the Supreme Court; the House of Representatives Electoral Tribunal on the other hand is composed of six representatives and three justices of the Supreme Court.

Electoral tribubal	Party	Contingent leader	Party	Minority leader
Senate	Liberal	Francis Pangilinan	Nacionalista	Pia Cayetano
House of Representatives	Liberal	Franklin Bautista	Lakas	Simeon Datumanong

==== Senate committees ====
The Senate President, Senate President pro tempore and the Floor Leaders are ex officio members of all committees; the majority floor leader is automatically the chair of the Committee on Rules.

==== House of Representatives committees ====
The Speaker, Deputy Speakers and the Floor Leaders are ex officio members of all committees; the majority floor leader is automatically the chair of the Committee on Rules.

== Legislative activities ==
=== Legislative calendar ===
- First Regular Session:
  - Commencement: July 26, 2010
  - Adjournment: October 16, 2010
  - Resumption: November 8, 2010
  - Adjournment: December 18, 2010
  - Resumption: January 17, 2011
  - Adjournment: March 26, 2011
  - Resumption: May 9, 2011
  - Adjournment: June 9, 2011
- Second Regular Session
  - Commencement: July 25, 2011
- Third Regular Session

=== First Regular Session ===
==== Convening ====
Unlike at the beginning of the 14th Congress, the election of the presiding officers for both houses proceeded without incident as Quezon City representative Feliciano Belmonte, Jr. of the Liberal Party was elected as Speaker of the House of Representatives while Juan Ponce Enrile of PMP was re-elected Senate President. Alan Peter Cayetano of the Nacionalistas and Albay representative Edcel Lagman of Lakas-Kampi were named minority floor leaders of the Senate and the House of Representatives, respectively.

In his State of the Nation Address (SONA), President Benigno Aquino III bared the anomalies during the presidency of Gloria Macapagal Arroyo such as a budget deficit in the first half of the year, a depleted calamity fund that mostly went to Pampanga, Gloria Macapagal Arroyo's home province, corruption at the Metropolitan Waterworks and Sewerage System, Department of Public Works and Highways, National Power Corporation, Metro Rail Transit Corporation and the National Food Authority. Aquino announced steps to weed out tax evaders, and asked the Commission on Appointments to be easy on his Cabinet.

==== Postponement of the barangay elections ====
The minority bloc filed bills to postpone the upcoming barangay (village) and Sangguniang Kabataan (SK; youth council) elections in October until 2011. Lakas-Kampi representative Danilo Suarez of Quezon remarked that since the barangay and SK elections were too close to the just-concluded general election, and that congressmen would run out of funds as candidates for barangay positions turn to them for financial support. The president wants the barangay elections to be held at October, but the winners' terms shall only be until May 2013 where the barangay elections will be held concurrently with the 2013 general election. In the Senate, Migz Zubiri filed a bill that will postponed the elections until October 2012, with Enrile prioritizing it.

On August 18, the House of Representatives Committee on Suffrage and Electoral Reforms agreed to consolidate bills that seek to postpone the barangay elections, with Commission on Elections chairman Jose Melo preferring a 2011 date since synchronizing it with the 2013 general election would be costly as it will be included in the automation project. The City Mayors League preferred postponement up to 2011, the Liga ng mga Barangay wants a 2012 election while the SK prefers any year as long as it is held in October.

In the next hearing of the Committee on Suffrage and Electoral Reforms, the bills deferring the elections were defeated, paving the way for the elections to be held on October 25. Committee chairman Elpidio Barzaga said that "Mr. Aquino wants elections to push through because he wants barangay officials who will serve during his term to have a fresh mandate from the people," with the ex officio members of the House of Representatives voting on Magtanggol Gunigundo's motion to "lay down all the bills on the table." This meant that any further hearings on the matter shall be suspended indefinitely.

==== Impeachment of Merceditas Gutierrez ====
While there had been attempts in the 14th Congress, to impeach Ombudsman Merceditas Gutierrez, none of them passed the committee level.

In July 2010, Akbayan Citizens' Action Party filed an impeachment complain against Gutierrez. A few days later in August, Bagong Alyansang Makabayan (New Patriotic Alliance) filed a separate complaint. Both complaints were simultaneously referred to the House of Representative Committee on Justice headed by Iloilo representative Niel Tupas, Jr.

On September 1, the committee voted both complaints as sufficient in form. A week later, the committee voted both complaints as sufficient in substance. On September 13, Gutierrez filed a motion to the Supreme Court saying that the two complaints violated the one proceeding per year rule. The next day, the court voted to pass a status quo ante order that stopped the impeachment proceedings.

Five months after the order, the court lifted the status quo ante order, on February 15, 2011, thereby allowing the impeachment proceedings to resume, saying that while there are two complaints, there was only one hearing. The day before the committee would've met to continue the proceedings, Gutierrez filed a motion for reconsideration to reinstate the status quo ante order. The committee met anyway, and found the two complaints sufficient in grounds.

On the next hearing, Gutierrez, who had not been attending the impeachment proceeding as she had pending cases on the Supreme Court, sent a representative. The committee was about to vote on whether the two complaints had probable cause when they learned that the Supreme Court dismissed Gutierrez's petitions; after they were notified, the committee voted that both complaints had probable cause.

After a marathon session that lasted into the next day, the House of Representatives on March 22 voted to impeach Gutierrez of betrayal of public trust, with 212 in favor, 46 against and 4 abstentions. Tupas headed the House of Representatives delegation that passed the Articles of Impeachment to the Senate on March 23.

Gutierrez, citing that "the President needs an Ombudsman in whom he has complete trust and confidence," resigned on April 29, 2011. With her resignation, the senate canceled the impeachment trial.

==== 2011 national budget ====
The deliberations for the enactment of the national budget were opposed by several representatives from the Visayas and Mindanao as they contended that their allocation in the budget, 7.7% for the Visayas and 10% for Mindanao, were not enough. Appropriations Committee chair Joseph Emilio Abaya said while that there will be realignments done, there will be no major realignments. Another point of contention was the conditional cash transfer program, which, Budget Secretary Florencio Abad, will help the country in halving poverty, which is one of the Millennium Development Goals. The inclusion of the conditional cash transfer program caused the budget for the Department of Social Welfare and Development to increase 123% from PHP15.4 billion to PHP34.3 billion. The PHP1.645 trillion budget was passed by the House of Representatives on October 16 in a marathon session.

The Senate approved their version of the budget, with the major changes from the House version include the increase in allocation for the Office of the Vice President, additional PHP590 million for the House of Representatives, additional PHP345 million for the Senate, the restoration of PHP143.107 million for public colleges, additional subsidy of PHP200 million for local government units and reducing PHP200 million from the Department of Health supposedly for the purchase of contraceptives. The PHP21 billion conditional cash transfer program was kept.

On December 27, 2010, for the first time in eleven years, President Aquino signed the national budget into law before the year ended. Aquino vetoed 13 items, including the provision that Congress should authorize borrowings in excess of the debt ceiling and legislative consultation during budget execution and project implementation.

==== Investigation of the alleged corruption in the military ====
The House Committee on Justice conducted hearings on the plea bargaining agreement of the Office of the Ombudsman and retired General Carlos Garcia who has a plunder suit in the Sandiganbayan (special court for government officials). The Senate Blue Ribbon Committee on the other hand, focused on the pabaon or send-off money given to generals.

On January 26, retired Col. George Rabusa exposed the alleged pabaon or send-off system in the military, which gives at least PHP50 million (USD4.64 million) to retiring chiefs of staff of the Armed Forces of the Philippines (AFP) On January 30, Rabusa further said that former AFP chiefs of staff Diomedio Villanueva and Roy Cimatu were also given send-off money, and former military comptrollers Carlos Garcia and Jacinto Ligot were instrumental to the transfer of funds; Garcia and Ligot had earlier been charged already due to the anomalies.

On a hearing of the House of Representatives Committee on Justice, former Commission on Audit (COA) auditor Heidi Mendoza testified that she uncovered irregularities in funds by the military. Among the irregularities she found was the 200 million peso AFP Inter-Agency Fund, and the US$5 million United Nations (UN) reimbursement for Filipino peacekeepers.

Early morning of February 8, Reyes died in an apparent suicide. Later in the day, the House of Representatives Committee on Justice voted to continue the hearing. Mendoza testified that the military's modernization fund was diverted for the purchase of office supplies, and disputed former COA chairman Guillermo Carague, who denied that he ordered Mendoza to "go slow" in the Garcia case.

The Senate Blue Ribbon Committee summoned Ligot's wife Jacinta on the February 24 hearing; however, she was skipped as she was confined in Veterans Memorial Medical Center. Her brother, Edgardo Yambao, was also summoned but invoke his right against self-incrimination when asked about his wealth. On the March 21, hearing, Erlinda showed up but just like her husband and her brother, she refused to answer questions that were related to her husband's pending cases, invoking her right against self-incrimination. The Ligots did not appear in the March 25 hearing and was cited for contempt; Jacinto was detained at the Senate while Erlinda's detention was suspended for humanitarian reasons. On the March 29 hearing, Erlinda cited "Dara" (Kapampangan word to denote "aunt") as her frequent travel companion in her overseas trips; Senator Jinggoy Estrada had earlier said that she had traveled with Reyes' wife Teresita. Blue Ribbon Committee Chairman Teofisto Guingona III ordered the release of General Ligot after the hearing.

==== Postponement of the ARMM general election ====
On February 3, 2011, President Aquino asked Congress to postpone the general election in the Autonomous Region in Muslim Mindanao (ARMM) and synchronize it with the 2013 mid-term election. The officials that would end their terms in 2011 would be replaced by appointments by Aquino. Presidential spokesman Edwin Lacierda said that aside from ensuring clean elections, a synchronized ARMM election would be cost-effective. On March 22, the House of Representatives passed the bill before Congress went on recess, while the Senate would take up the measure after the recess. On May 3, the Supreme Court ordered the executive and Congress to file comments on a petition from ARMM residents questioning the postponement.

==== Reproductive Health bill ====
On November 24, 2010, the House of Representatives population committee acted on the bills about reproductive health. However, Cebu representative Pablo P. Garcia disputed the committee's jurisdiction on the bills, saying it should have been referred to the Committee on Health. Committee chairman Rogelio Espina reasoned out that no one objected when the bills were referred to his committee. On January 31, 2011, the committee unanimously approved a consolidated version; the approval meant that for the first time after similar bills were created in 1998, that a reproductive health bill would be tackled in plenary session. On February 16, the House of Representatives appropriations committee approved funding for bill, with the Department of Health and the Population Commission receiving additional budgets.

The measure would have been tackled in plenary session on March 8, but questions on quorum and proper attire delayed the proceedings. The authors of the bill agreed to amend some provisions, such as making sex education optional, removal of an "ideal family size" of two children, removal of the provision that orders business to provide reproductive health services to their employees, among others. Primary author Edcel Lagman said that this would not water down the bill, as the "central idea" of the bill was not touched.

== Legislation ==
Laws passed by the 15th Congress:
