= General Garcia (disambiguation) =

Calixto García (1836–1898) was a Cuban general in three Cuban uprisings in the Cuban War for Independence. General Garcia may also refer to:

- Cesar Garcia (intelligence chief) (fl. 1970s–2010s), former Director-General of the National Intelligence Coordinating Agency of the Republic of the Philippines
- Fernando Romeo Lucas García (1924–2006), Guatemalan general
- José Guillermo García (born 1933), Salvadoran Army brigadier general
- Kjell Eugenio Laugerud García (1930–2009), Guatemalan brigadier general who served as the 36th President of Guatemala
