= Camp General Basilio Navarro =

Philippine military base in Zamboanga City

- Zamboanga City

Site information
- Type: Military Base
- Controlled by: Armed Forces of the Philippines

Location
- Location within Mindanao mainland Location within Philippines
- Coordinates: 6°55′4.52″N 122°2′28.16″E

Site history
- Materials: Concrete, steel

Garrison information
- Garrison: AFP Western Mindanao Command; 1st Infantry (TABAK) Division; 2nd Scout Ranger Battalion; 1st Light Reaction Battalion; Naval Forces Western Mindanao

Camp General Basilio Navarro is the main operating base of the Armed Forces of the Philippines (AFP) for the Southwest Philippines. It is located in Zamboanga City and serves as the headquarters of its Western Mindanao Command (WESTMINCOM).

== History ==
Camp Navarro has hosted the Southern Command (SOUTHCOM) of the AFP for decades. In 2005, news came that SOUTHCOM was to be moved to Pagadian City, which was met with wide protest by Zamboanga residents. This eventually led to a review of the AFP's organization.

By August 2006, then AFP Chief of Staff Gen. Hermogenes Esperon announced that the Southern Command of the AFP will be divided into the Western Mindanao Command and the Eastern Mindanao Command (EASTMINCOM). WESTMINCOM's joint service headquarters was to be located in Camp Navarro, while EASTMINCOM in Camp Panacan in Davao City.

Camp Navarro also plays an important role in the ongoing war on terrorism in the Philippines, and has hosted the U.S. Joint Special Operations Task Force – Philippines (JSOTF-P). The camp was also the venue of a number of BALIKATAN Philippines - U.S. military joint exercises.

== Description ==
Camp Navarro is located in Calarian district of Zamboanga City. West of the base is the Zamboanga Golf and Country Club. Camp Navarro is also 2 km west of the Philippine Air Force's Edwin Andrews Air Base.

Camp Navarro is adjacent to the Philippine Navy's Naval Station Romulo Espaldon, which is the headquarters of the Naval Forces Western Mindanao.

Current facilities on base are:

- Camp Navarro General Hospital (current Commanding Officer: COL CAESAR ALMER E CANDELARIA MC (GSC) PA)
- Officer's Club
- WestMinCom Gym

== See also ==
- Naval Station Romulo Espaldon
- Edwin Andrews Air Base (EAAB)
