= Narciso Abaya =

Philippine Army General

Chief Executive Officer Bases Conversion and Development Authority
- In office April 8, 2003 – October 29, 2004
- President: Gloria Macapagal-Arroyo
- Vice President: Noli De Castro

Chief of Staff of the Armed Forces of the Philippines
- In office December 8, 2001 – October 29, 2002
- President: Gloria Macapagal-Arroyo
- Vice President: Teofisto Guingona Jr
- Preceded by: Dionisio Santiago
- Succeeded by: Efren Abu

Commander AFP Southern Command
- In office 2002–2003
- President: Gloria Macapagal-Arroyo
- Vice President: Teofisto Guingona Jr
- Leader: General Benjamin Defensor
- Preceded by: Ernesto Carolina
- Succeeded by: Generoso Senga

Deputy Chief of Staff of the Armed Forces of the Philippines
- In office December 8, 2001 – June 5, 2002
- President: Gloria Macapagal-Arroyo
- Preceded by: Jaime de los Santos
- Succeeded by: Ernesto Carolina

Commander, AFP Southern Luzon Command
- In office March 2000 – December 2001
- President: Joseph Ejercito Estrada
- Vice President: Gloria Macapagal-Arroyo

Personal details
- Born: Caoayan, Ilocos Sur Philippines
- Spouse: Susan Abaya
- Education: Lehigh University (1974); US Military Academy (1971); Philippine Military Academy
- Profession: Military officer
- Nickname: Gen. Abaya

Military service
- Allegiance: Philippines
- Branch/service: Philippine Army
- Years of service: 1971–2004
- Rank: General

Narciso Abaya is a retired Philippine Army General who served its 32nd Chief of Staff of the Armed Forces of the Philippines and 6th under President Gloria Macapagal-Arroyo. He also served as Deputy Chief of Staff of the AFP prior appointment as chief of staff. He is now the president and CEO of Bases Conversion and Development Authority where he was appointed by President Arroyo in 2004 upon his retirement from Military service.

== Early life and education ==
Abaya was born in Caoayan, Ilocos Sur, on October 4, 1948. He passed the entrance test for Philippine Military Academy entered in 1966. While in his first year there he took entrance exam for United States Military Academy and passed. He attended USMA in WestPoint, New York and finish his bachelor's degree in 1971. He holds a master's degree in civil engineering in Lehigh University in Pennsylvania and topped the Civil Engineering examinations in 1974.

He has a Master of Business Administration diploma from University of the Philippines where he graduated with honors.

== Military career ==
Upon obtaining additional studies in USA, Abaya came home and assigned to engineering unit. He however found himself to be an aid to then Chief of Staff General Fabian Ver in Malacanang Palace. After Ver's departure in 1986 he was moved to regular unit. There he experiences commanding units in combat with New People's Army and Moro Rebels in Mindanao.

He was appointed to command Southern Luzon Command based in Lucena, Quezon and December 2001 he was appointed as Deputy Chief of Staff of Armed Forces and promoted Lieutenant General. He was appointed again by President Arroyo to command AFP Southern Command which provided fatal results to Abu Sayyaf and communist insurgents. He was appointed as Chief of Staff of AFP when General Santiago was nearing his retirement age. He served until October 29, 2002, before retiring from military service.

== Later years ==
Abaya was appointed as president and CEO of Bases Conversion and Development Agency which handles transactions that handles conversion of the land.

== See also ==
- Chief of Staff of the Armed Forces of the Philippines

Military offices
| Preceded by Dionisio Santiago | Chief of Staff of the Armed Forces of the Philippines; April 2003 - October 2004 | Succeeded by Efren Abu |
| Preceded by Ernesto Carolina | Commander of AFP Southern Command; October 2002 - April 2003 | Succeeded by Alberto Braganza |
| Preceded by Gregorio Camiling | Deputy Chief of Staff of the Armed Forces of the Philippines; October 2002 - April 2003 | Succeeded by |
