= Hermogenes Esperon Jr. =

Filipino government official

Retired General Hermogenes Esperon AFP
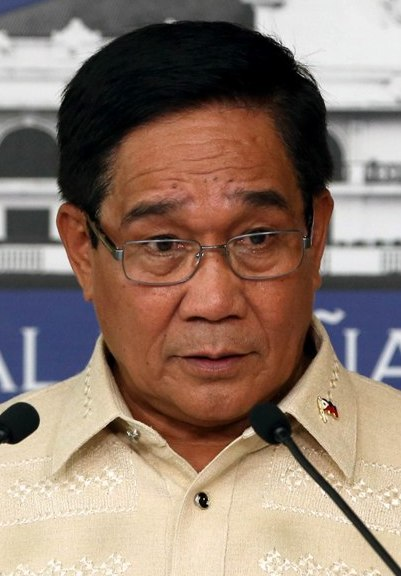
- Esperon in May 2017

National Security Adviser
- In office June 30, 2016 – June 30, 2022
- President: Rodrigo Duterte
- Preceded by: Cesar Garcia
- Succeeded by: Clarita Carlos

Presidential Management Staff
- President: Gloria Macapagal-Arroyo
- Preceded by: Cerge Remonde
- Succeeded by: Julia Abad

Office of Presidential Adviser on Peace Process
- President: Gloria Macapagal-Arroyo
- Preceded by: Jesus Dureza
- Succeeded by: Avelino Razon

36th Chief of Staff of the Armed Forces of The Philippines
- In office 2006–2008
- President: Gloria Macapagal-Arroyo
- Preceded by: Generoso Senga
- Succeeded by: Alexander B. Yano

Commanding General Philippine Army
- In office July 2005 – May 2006
- President: Gloria Macapagal Arroyo
- Preceded by: Generoso S. Senga
- Succeeded by: Alexander B. Yano

Commander AFP Special Operations Command
- In office 2004–2005
- President: Gloria Macapagal Arroyo
- Preceded by: Delfin Lorenzana
- Succeeded by: Jovenal Narcise

Commander Presidential Security Group
- In office 2002–2003
- President: Gloria Macapagal-Arroyo
- Preceded by: Brigadier General Glenn Rabonza
- Succeeded by: Brigadier General Delfin Bangit

Personal details
- Born: Hermogenes Cendaña Esperon Jr. February 9, 1952 (age 74) Asingan, Pangasinan, Philippines
- Party: Lakas-CMD
- Education: Philippine Military Academy; University of the Philippines; Philippine Christian University

Military service
- Allegiance: Philippines
- Branch/service: Philippine Army
- Years of service: 1974–2008
- Rank: General
- Commands: Chief of Staff, Armed Forces of the Philippines; Commanding General, Philippine Army; Special Operations Command, PA; 7th Infantry Division, PA; Deputy Chief of Staff for Operations, J3, AFP; Presidential Security Group, AFP; 103rd Infantry Brigade, 1ID, PA; 602nd Infantry Brigade, 6ID, PA

Hermogenes Cendaña Esperon Jr. (Tagalog: [hɛɾmoˈhɛnɛs ʔɛspɛˈron]; born February 9, 1952) is a retired Philippine Army general who served as the National Security Adviser in the Cabinet of President Rodrigo Duterte from 2016 to 2022. He was the Chief of Staff of the Armed Forces of the Philippines from 2006 to 2008 and Commanding General of the Philippine Army from 2005 to 2006 under President Gloria Macapagal Arroyo. After his retirement from the military, he served in Arroyo's administration as the Presidential Adviser on the Peace Process and later as the head of the Presidential Management Staff.

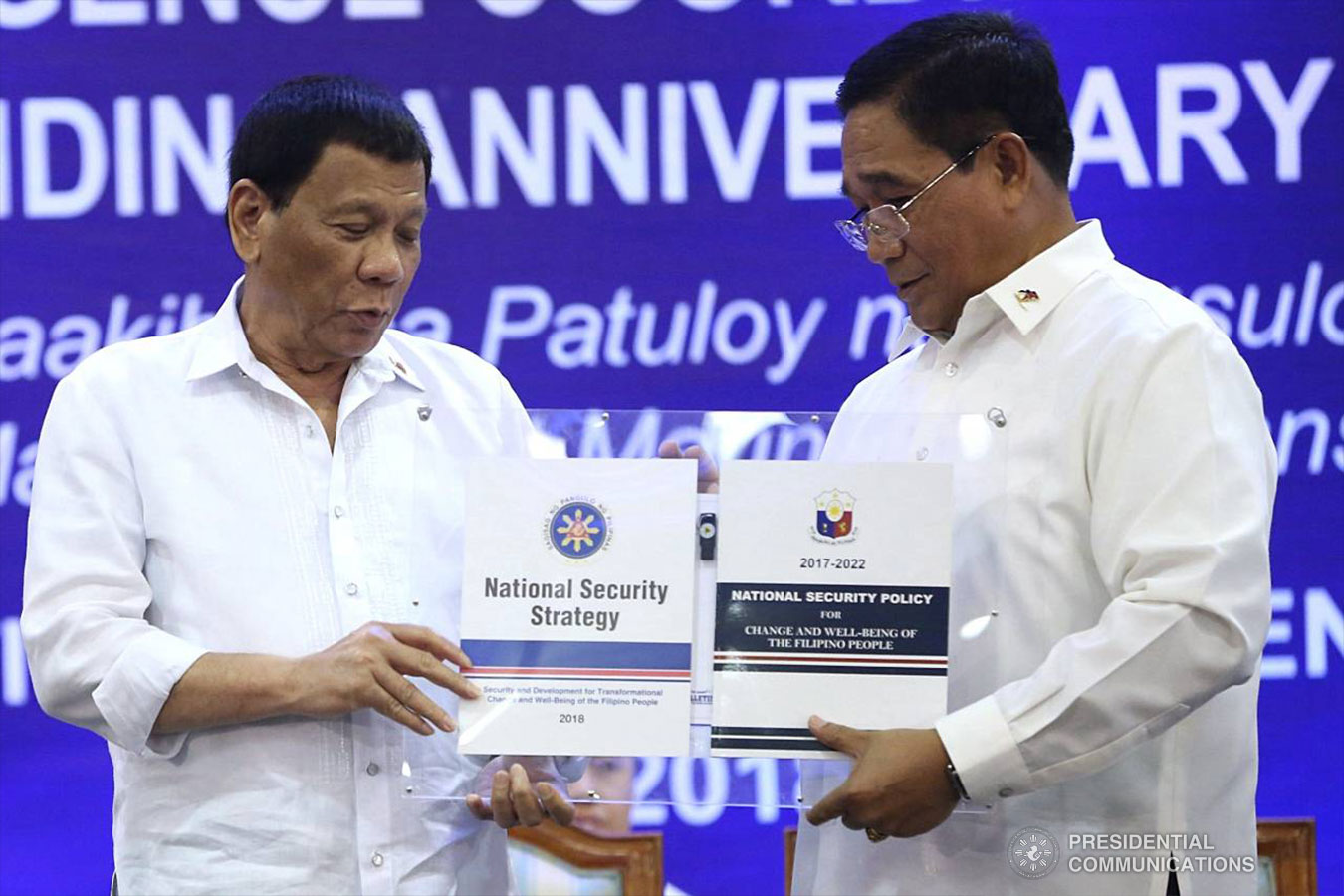
President Rodrigo Duterte (left) and National Security Adviser Hermogenes Esperon Jr. during the Joint 68th National Security Council and 69th NICA Founding Anniversary Celebration at the PICC in Pasay on July 31, 2018.

== Professional experience ==
Esperon's professional government experience includes:

- Presidential Management Staff, 2009-2010
- Office of The Presidential Adviser on The Peace Process (OPAPP), 2008
- Chief of Staff, Armed Forces of The Philippines (CSAFP), 2006-2008
- Commanding General, Philippine Army (CGPA), 2005-2006
- Special Operations Command (SOCOM), 2004-2005
- 7th Infantry Division, PA, (Fort Magsaysay, Nueva Ecija), 2004
- Deputy chief of staff for operations (J3, AFP), 2003-2004
- Group commander, Presidential Security Group (PSG), AFP, 2002-2003
- 103rd Infantry Brigade, 1st Infantry Division, PA (Basilan), 2001
- 602nd Infantry Brigade, 6th Infantry Division, PA (Carmen, Cotabato), 2000-2001
- Assistant chief of staff for operations (G3, PA), 1999-2000
- Chief, Joint Operations Center (JOC), General Headquarters, AFP, 1998-1999
- Deputy group commander (PSG), AFP, 1996–1998.
- Commander Presidential Escorts (PSG), AFP, 1997-1998 Concurrent
- Task Group Commander, Task Force Asia-Pacific Economic Cooperation (APEC), 1996
- Chief of Intelligence Staff, Southern Command (SOUTHCOM, Currently WESTMINCOM), AFP (Zamboanga City), 1995-1996
- Deputy for Operations (G3, PA), 1993
- Battalion Commander, 30th Infantry Battalion, 4th Infantry Division (Agusan), 1991 -1993
- Commander, Counterintelligence Group, PA, 1990-1991
- Staff, Southern Command (SOUTHCOM, Currently WESTMINCOM), AFP (Zamboanga City), 1989-1990
- Intelligence Staff Chief, 7th Infantry Division, PA (Currently Northern Luzon Command - NoLCom, Camp Aquino, Tarlac), 1987-1989
- National Intelligence and Security Authority (Currently National Intelligence Coordinating Agency - NICA), 1977- 1982
- Commander, B Co., 36th Infantry Battalion, 4th Infantry Division (Basilan, Sulu, Zamboanga), 1975-1977
- Platoon Leader, B Co., 23rd Infantry Battalion, 4th Infantry Division (Basilan, Sulu), 1974 -1975
- Cadet, Philippine Military Academy (PMA), 1970-1974

== Education and training ==
Esperon's education and training include:

- Philippine Science High School, "Pisay Dos" Class of 1970
- Philippine Military Academy "Marangal" Class, 1974
- Jungle Warfare and Mountain Operations Course, Philippine Army, 1973
- Infantry Officer Basic Course, 1974
- Intelligence Officer Basic Course, ISAFP, 1976
- Integrated Service Attache Course, DFA, 1981
- Master's in Business Administration, University of the Philippines, 1981-1982 (DNF)
- Infantry Officer Advance Course, 1986
- Master's in Management studies with a major in Public Administration, Philippine Christian University, 1995
- Joint Services Command and General Staff Course, AFP, 1996

== Awards and recognition ==
Esperon's awards include:

- Philippine Republic Presidential Unit Citation
- Long Service Medal
- Order of Lakandula Grand Cross (Bayani) President of the Philippines, 2010 (As Presidential Peace Adviser and Head Presidential Management Staff - Cabinet Rank)
- Order of Lakandula Grand Cross (Bayani), President of the Philippines, 2022 (as NSA 2016-2022)
- Presidential Award of the Yudha Dharma, Republic of Indonesia, 2009
- King's Award of Malaysia, 2007
- Lagablab Award, Philippine Science High School, 2001
- Presidential Medal of Merit, 1998
- PMA Cavalier Award (as outstanding alumnus of the Philippine Military Academy), 1999
- Eleven Distinguished Service Star
- Four Philippine Legion of Honor
- Two Outstanding Achievement Medal (OAM)
- Four Gold Cross Medals
- Five Bronze Cross Medals
- Three Command Plaque
- Gawad sa Kaunlaran Award
- Three Outstanding Service Awards
- Plaque of Merit
- Military Commendation Medal
- Luzon Anti Dissidence Campaign Medal
- Visayas Anti-Dissidence Campaign Medal
- Mindanao Anti-dissidence Campaign Medal
- Grand Meritorious Military Order Star 1st Class Indonesia, 2007
- Grand Military Awards conferred by the Yang di-Pertuan Agong of Malaysia
- Disaster Relief and Rehabilitation Operations Ribbon
- - Military Civic Action Medal

== Present affiliations ==
- Chairman of the Board of Directors, Philtrust Bank, September 2022 to date
- Consultant, Phoenix Petroleum Philippines Inc., 2015-2016
- Consultant Manila Bulletin, 2012-2016
- Partner, RVS 4-Star Maricultured Coral Farms, 2012–present
- Lifetime member, Philippine Military Courses; Handicap 12

== Political career ==
Esperon ran for a position as Congressman in the 6th District of Pangasinan in the past May 2010 elections but lost.

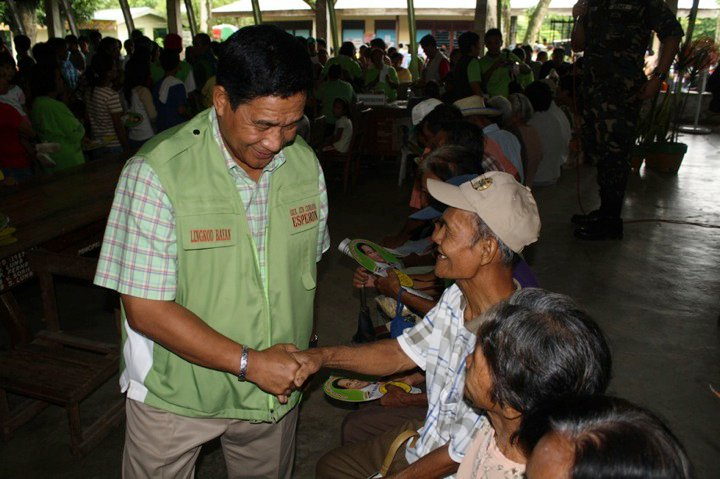
Hermogenes Esperon during a social work in the Sixth District of Pangasinan

== Controversies ==
Irked by Partylist Representatives Satur Ocampo and Liza Maza's opposition to his bid to seek a congressional seat in the May polls, outgoing Presidential Management Staff Chief Hermogenes Esperon Jr. demanded that the two lawmakers, who are also seeking seats in the Senate, to come clean about their links with the underground leftist "legal fronts" known to be connected with the Communist Party of the Philippines - New people's Army (CPP-NPA).

Esperon said he was "proud of his achievements as a former Armed Forces’ chief of staff, especially in the government's fight against the communist insurgency".

As the assistant chief of staff for operations, J3 at General Headquarters, AFP; Esperon was implicated during the 2004 alleged election fraud. He was mentioned in taped conversations called the "Garci Tapes" to have worked for the relief of a brigade commander in Lanao who was not sympathetic to then presidential candidate Macapagal-Arroyo. However, his involvement has not been proven.

Military offices
Preceded by Gen. Generoso Senga	Chief of Staff of the Armed Forces of the Philippines; 2006–2008	Succeeded by Gen. Alexander Yano
Political offices
Preceded by Cesar Garcia	National Security Adviser; 2016–2022	Succeeded by Clarita Carlos
