= Cesar Garcia (intelligence chief) =

Filipino general

National Security Adviser
- In office July 9, 2010 – June 30, 2016
- President: Benigno Aquino III
- Preceded by: Norberto Gonzales
- Succeeded by: Hermogenes Esperon

Personal details
- Education: Philippine Military Academy
- Profession: Soldier

Cesar P. Garcia, Jr. is the former Director-General of the National Intelligence Coordinating Agency of the Republic of the Philippines. He is a graduate of the Philippine Military Academy class of 1970.

On 20 August 2008, Garcia resigned due to arthritis, and was succeeded by Major General Pedro Cabuay.

However, on 9 July 2010, President Benigno Aquino III appointed him as National Security Adviser.
