= Pedro Cabuay =

- Military career
- Allegiance: Republic of the Philippines
- Branch: Philippine Army
- Rank: Lieutenant General
- Commands: Armed Forces of the Philippines AFP Southern Luzon Command Intelligence Service Armed Forces of the Philippines

Pedro R. Cabuay Jr. is a Filipino lawyer and retired military officer who served as Director General of the National Intelligence Coordinating Agency under the administration of President Gloria Macapagal Arroyo from October 2008 to 2010. He retired as Lieutenant General in the Armed Forces of the Philippines in 2006 after serving as Commander, AFP Southern Luzon Command. He also served as Chief of the Intelligence Service of the Armed Forces of the Philippines (ISAFP).
