= Armed Forces and Police Savings & Loan Association, Inc. =

Philippine banking corporation

The Armed Forces and Police Savings & Loan Association, Inc. (AFPSLAI) is a banking corporation in the Philippines associated with the Philippine military and police.

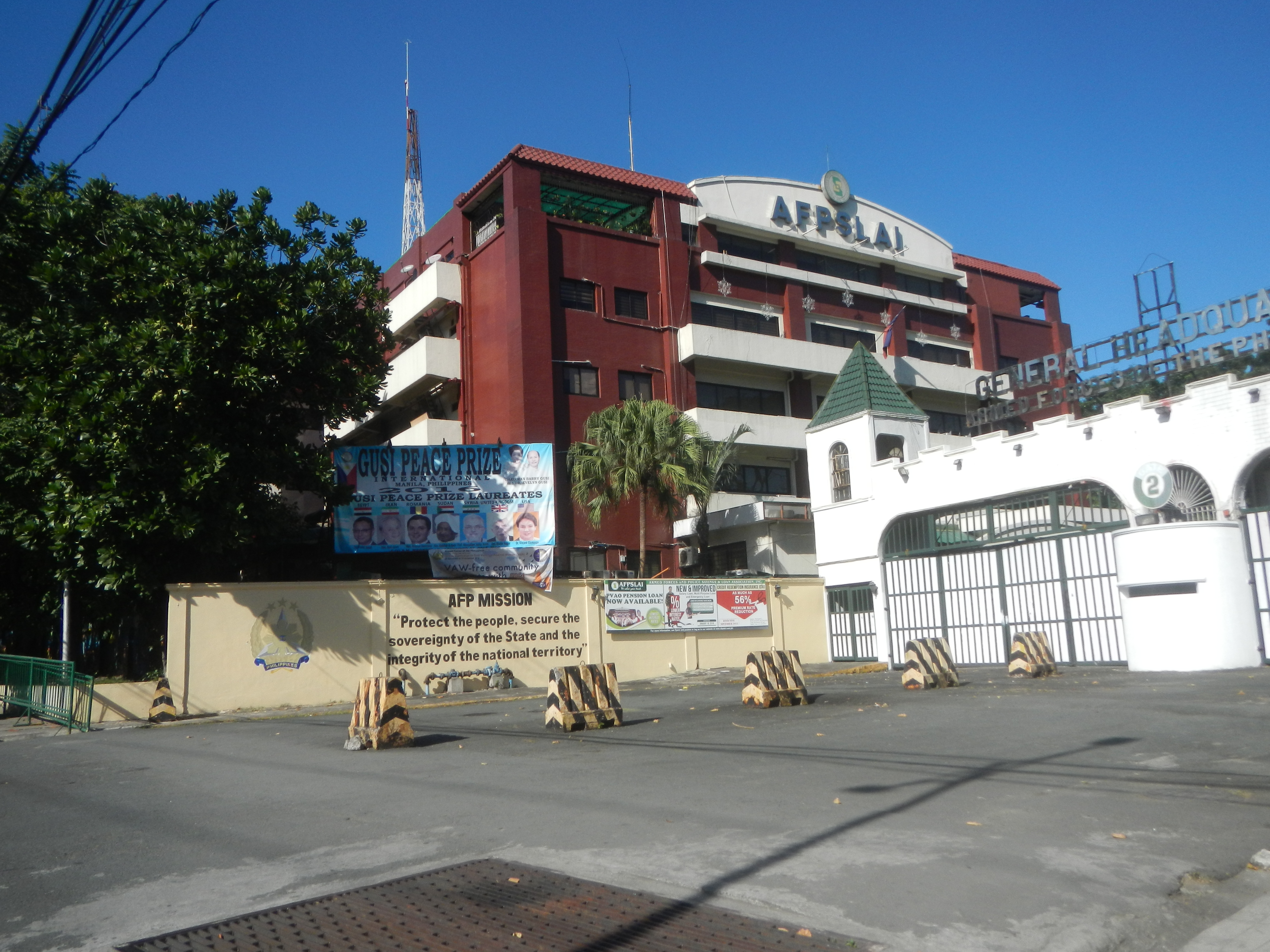
Camp Aguinaldo branch

As of 2016, it had 69 billion Philippine pesos in assets, which are exempt from taxes in the Philippines. As of 2017, there are 21 branches within the Philippines along with 50 extension offices. There are about 500,000 AFPSLAI members. Any changes in its bylaws are required to be approved by the Bangko Sentral ng Pilipinas.

The Savings and Loan has a reputation for offering tax-free, high yield dividend products to its members which are not insured by the PDIC. Quarterly contributions to the higher yielding investments are capped.

== Events ==
In 1986, Noe S. Andaya was newly elected as president was elected to head the AFPSLAI. He wanted to increase its capitalization, and in order to do this two years later the association began granting a one percent finders' fee to encourage recruiters to get new depositors to establish accounts. Unfortunately, the cost of the finders' fee drained the AFPSLAI's finances and contributed to its collapse. Then President of the Philippines Corazon Aquino noted in a 1992 State of the Union address that since the AFPSLAI had collapsed, it would no longer manage the military's pensions. In 2016, a news report incorrectly stated that the AFPSLAI managed the pensions. President and CEO of the AFPSLAI and retired Lt. General Virgilio O. Domingo responded in a letter to a newspaper editor that it didn't manage the pensions anymore.

In 1992, a group of VARO Manila Foreign Service employees organized a scheme to swindle the AFPSLAI. They produced fraudulent pension award letters. Then, the letters were taken to the AFPSLAI where they were used as collateral for a total of 1.5 million Philippine pesos in loans. The loans were then defaulted upon. This was halted by terminating the VARO Manila employees.

In 2002, a total of 117.7 million Philippine pesos in rebates were distributed to about 195,000 accounts. The rebates were for salary loans and ranged from 500 to 2,000 Philippine pesos each.

In 2002, it had nonperforming bad loans of 1.4 billion Philippine pesos, but for 2003 this had increased to 4.18 billion Philippine pesos. As of 2017, the last major loss it took was in 2006 when it lost 500 million Philippine pesos invested in the Centennial Savings Bank and Centennial Financing Corp

In 2017, the branch in Calapan helped police nab a group of 8 criminals who used the identity to of a retired policeman in an attempt to swindle the AFPSLAI out of 2 million Philippine pesos.

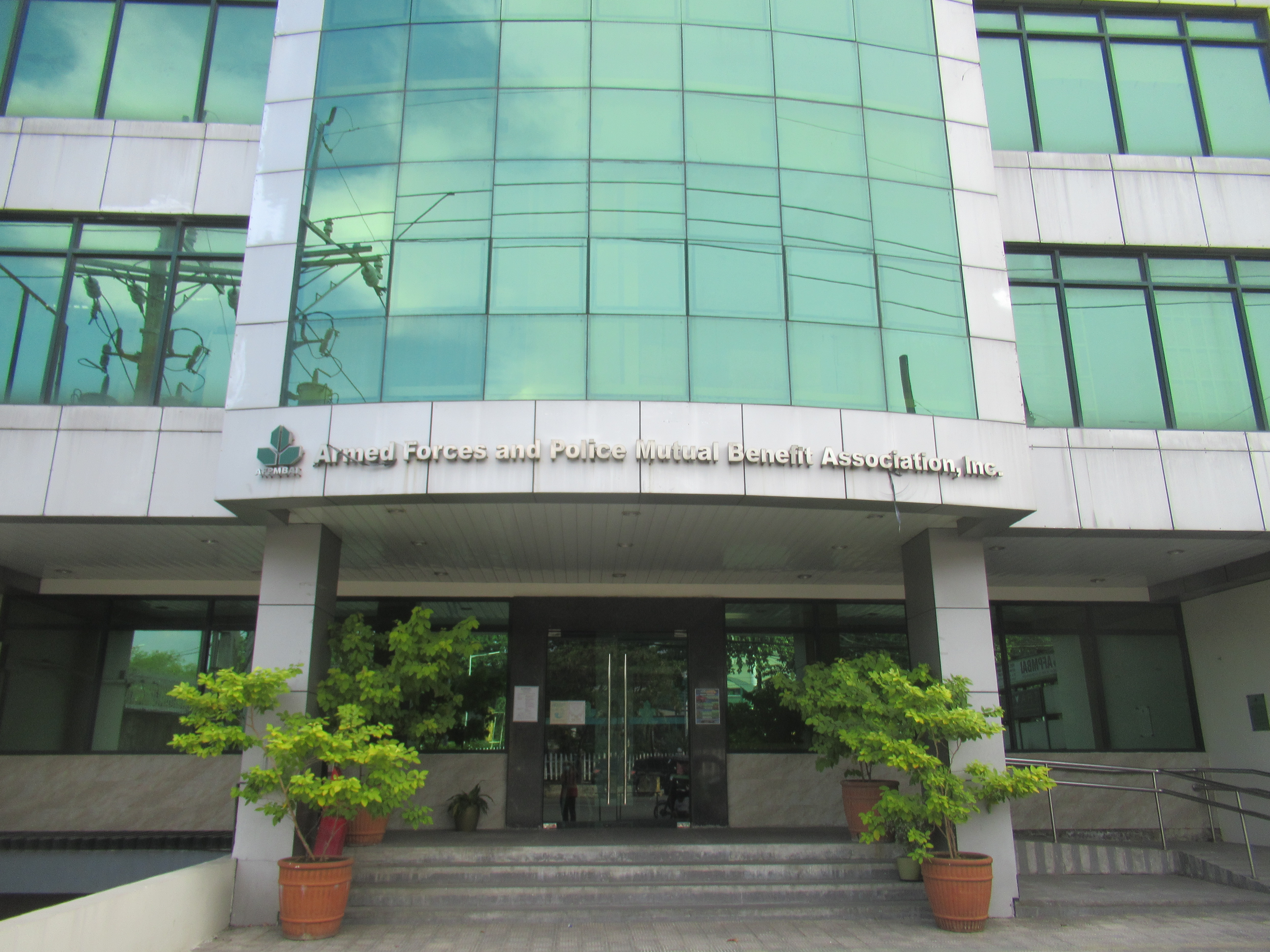
Facade in BGC

Personal loans made to military personnel and police officers are repaid by automatic deductions from their paychecks. In recognition of the hardship caused by the COVID-19 pandemic, the Philippine National Police ordered a 30-day moratorium on automatic repayments for the month of April 2020.

=== Charitable activities ===
- Scholarship program for dependents of members
- Outreach program
- Donations of items for military bases
- 2020 Taal Volcano eruption aid
- Financial literacy
- Anti-violence and anti-extremism peace advocacy

== See also ==
- Armed Forces & Police Mutual Benefit Association, Inc (AFPMBAI)
- 2011 Armed Forces of the Philippines corruption scandal
