= Dionisio Santiago =

Filipino retired Army General and public servant

Dionisio R. Santiago

Chairman Dangerous Drugs Board
- In office July 2017 – November 2017
- President: Rodrigo Duterte
- Preceded by: Benjamin P. Reyes
- Succeeded by: Catalino Cuy

Director Philippine Drug Enforcement Agency
- In office 2006–2011
- President: Gloria Macapagal-Arroyo

Executive Director, Dangerous Drugs Board
- In office January 2005 – April 2006
- President: Gloria Macapagal-Arroyo

Director Bureau of Corrections
- In office 2003–2004
- President: Gloria Macapagal-Arroyo
- Succeeded by: Gaudencio Pangilinan

Chief of Staff of the Armed Forces of the Philippines
- In office November 2002 – April 2003
- President: Gloria Macapagal-Arroyo
- Preceded by: Benjamin Defensor
- Succeeded by: Narciso Abaya

Commanding General of the Philippine Army
- In office July 2001 – March 2002
- President: Gloria Macapagal-Arroyo
- Preceded by: Jaime Delos Santos
- Succeeded by: Gregorio Camiling

Commander of the AFP Central Command
- In office July 2001 – March 2002
- President: Gloria Macapagal-Arroyo
- Preceded by: Julius Javier
- Succeeded by: Jacinto Ligot

Commander AFP Special Operations Command
- In office August 1999 – July 2001
- President: Gloria Macapagal-Arroyo
- Succeeded by: Delfin Lorenzana

Personal details
- Citizenship: Filipino
- Party: People's Reform Party
- Education: Masters in Public Administration; BS Military Science
- Alma mater: Seattle University (1983); University of the Philippines(1974); Philippine Military Academy(1970)
- Occupation: Soldier
- Profession: Public Servant; Engineer; Soldier
- Awards: Order of Sikatuna (Degree of Commander); International Fellow Hall of Fame, US Army War College

Military service
- Allegiance: Philippines
- Branch/service: Philippine Army
- Years of service: 1970 - 2003 (37 years)
- Rank: General
- Battles/wars: All-Out War (1998) Moro Rebellion (1970)

Dionisio R. Santiago is a Filipino retired Army General and a public servant who served in various military and civilian positions. He is a former Chief of Staff of the Armed Forces of the Philippines and was appointed chair of Dangerous Drugs Board in July 2017.

== Political views ==
As a retired general, Santiago supported Rodrigo Duterte's candidacy for president in the 2016 election and Sara Duterte's candidacy for vice president in the 2022 election. By 2024, however, Santiago expressed regret in voting for vice president Duterte after she issued assassination threats against president Bongbong Marcos, his wife Liza and House Speaker Martin Romualdez in November.

== See also ==
- Chief of the Army (Philippines)
- Chief of Staff of the Armed Forces of the Philippines
- Philippine Army

Military offices
Preceded by Benjamin Defensor	Chief of Staff of the Armed Forces of the Philippines; November 2002 to April 2003	Succeeded by Narciso Abaya
Preceded by Jaime Delos Santos	Commanding General Philippines Army; March 2002 to November 2002	Succeeded by Narciso Abaya
Preceded by Julius Javier	Commander AFP Central Command; July 2001 to March 2002	Succeeded by Jacinto Ligot
Preceded by	Commander AFP Special Operations Command; August 1999 to July 2001	Succeeded by Delfin Lorenzana
