= Armed Forces & Police Mutual Benefit Association =

Government-run deposit insurance fund for military and police officers

Armed Forces & Police Mutual Benefit Association, Inc.
- Industry: Finance
- Founded: September 1, 1965; 60 years ago
- Headquarters: Metro Manila, Philippines
- Services: Deposit insurance funds for military and police

The Armed Forces & Police Mutual Benefit Association, Inc (AFPMBAI) started in 1949 as the Armed Forces of the Philippines Mutual Benefit System (AFPMBS) created by the AFP during the height of the anti-dissident campaign in Central Luzon. It was incorporated on September 1, 1965, and registered with the SEC as a non-stock corporation with the soldiers and later, the police, fire, jail management, and coast guard personnel as members. It was licensed by the Insurance Commission as a mutual benefit association that extends the benefit and services for the welfare and financial security of its members and their family.

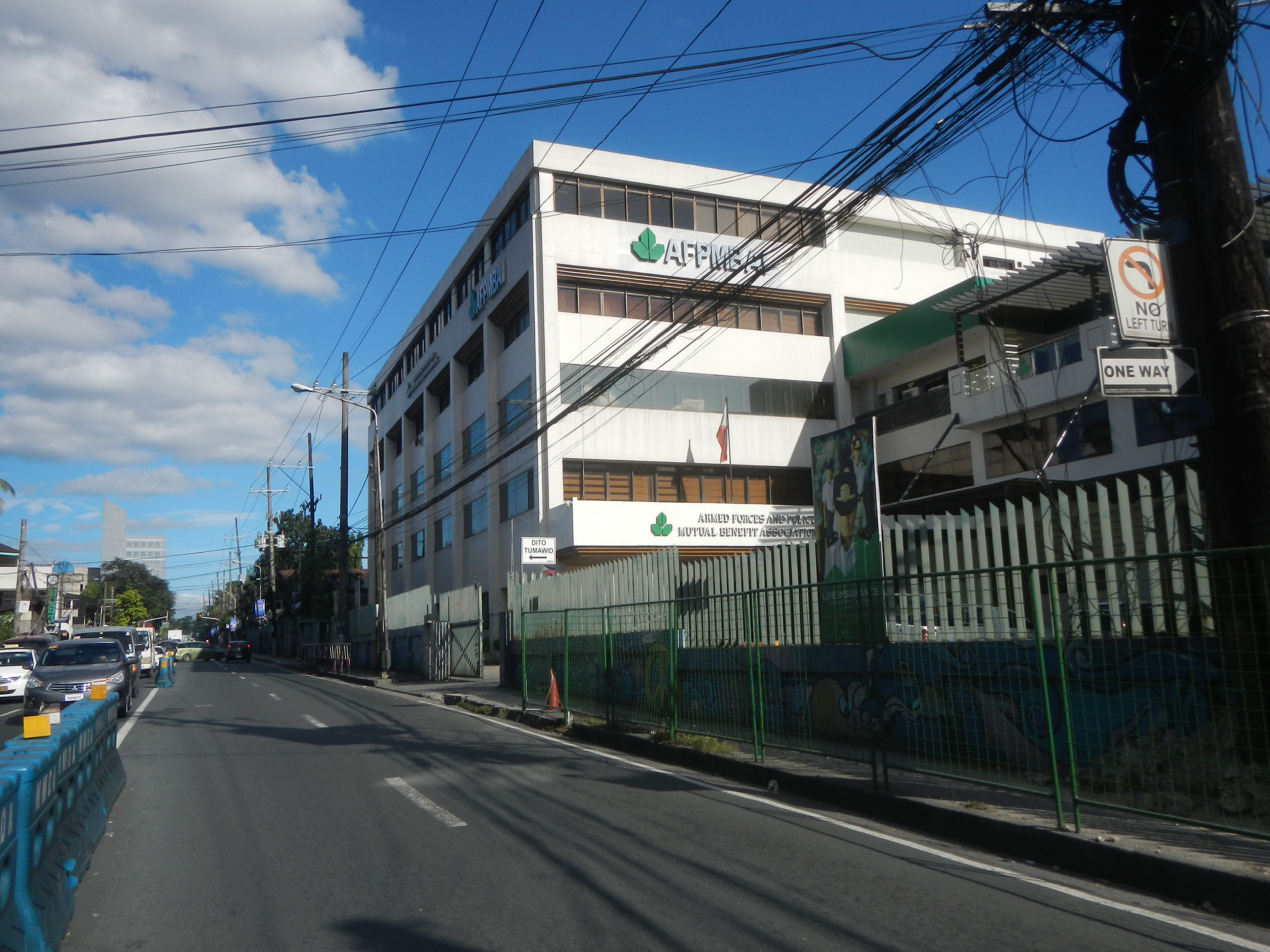
Bonny Serrano Avenue branch

As an insurance arm of the AFP, PNP, BFP, BJMP, and PCG, the Association was authorized to engage in the business of life insurance. It started by offering a Basic Insurance of Php3,000 exclusively for members which due to a series of upgrading, is now called MBAI Protek Basic Insurance, approved by the Insurance Commission in August 2018. MBAI Protek protects all uniformed personnel from the different branches of service with Natural Death, Accidental Death, Killed-in-Action, Wounded-in-Action, and Disability/Dismemberment Benefits from date of entry to the service, with only 1.5% of base pay monthly contributions. The basic insurance coverage of a PVT/PAT/FO1/JO1, for example, is at Php286,000 and Killed-in-Action Benefit is at Php629,000. Recently it has offered FREE COVID-19 Insurance Benefits of up to Php200,000 for those who perish and FREE Medical Assistance Benefit of up to Php24,000 for those who are diagnosed with COVID-19. As of 2008 it was the in assets largest non stock corporation monitored by the Philippines Securities and Exchange Commission.

The Association has expanded its services with the introduction of permanent insurance plans, such as the Whole Life Plan, 20-Pay Whole Life Plan, 10-Year Endowment Plan, and Endowment at 56 (E-56) Retirement Plan. The Association's bestsellers include the 5-Pay College Education Plan and 10-Pay Saver's Protection Plus, a 15-year anticipated endowment plan with 20% yearly cash bonuses and double insurance coverage. Its membership has likewise broadened by including the dependents of regular members, the civilian or non-uniformed personnel of the AFP, PNP, BFP, BJMP, PCG, and those persons performing activities related to national security and preservation of peace and order, such as the Bureau of Corrections (BuCor) and Philippine Drug Enforcement Agency (PDEA).

Apart from life insurance, the AFPMBAI also provides real estate, educational, salary, policy, equity and emergency loans to its members.

The Association is managed by a board of trustees composed of high-ranking military, police, and other officers from DILG-attached agencies who are representatives of the broad spectrum of its members. The members of the Board are appointed by the AFP Chief of Staff in accordance with Presidential Letter of Instruction 333.

AFPMBAI serves its members nationwide through its nationwide branch network, composed of 17 Branch Offices and 36 Extension Offices.

In 2024, the PSMBFI and Medicare Plus Inc. signed a partnership agreement to provide health care for Members of the Philippine National Police. PNP Chief Rommel Marbil, AFPMBAI's Chairman, Benjamin D. Santos and Emmanuel B. Peralta, President and CEO and Jason Jalandoni, Chief Business Development Officer, Medicare Plus Inc. launched the landmark contract in a ceremonial signing at Discovery Suites Manila.

== See also ==
- Fraternal Order of Police
- Armed Forces and Police Savings & Loan Association, Inc.
