= Roy Cimatu =

Filipino government official

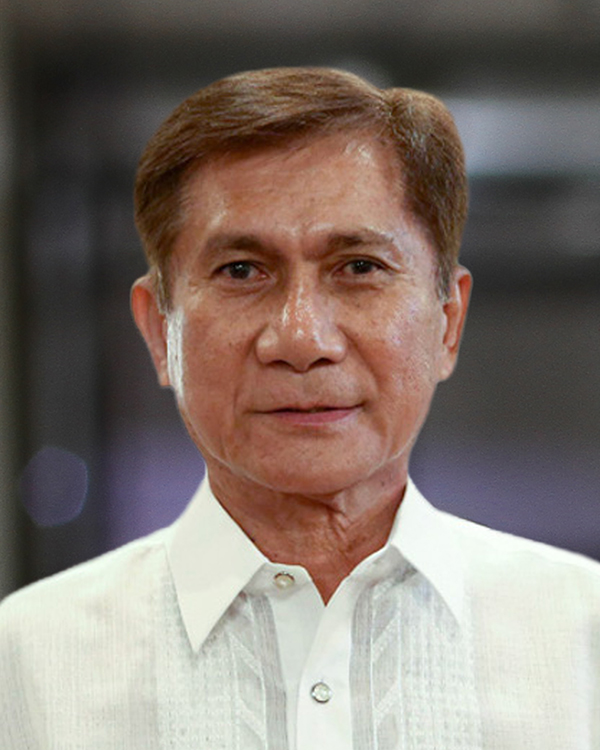

32nd Secretary of Environment and Natural Resources
- In office May 8, 2017 – February 18, 2022
- President: Rodrigo Duterte
- Preceded by: Gina Lopez (Ad interim)
- Succeeded by: Jim Sampluna (Acting)

COVID-19 Cebu Overseer
- In office June 22, 2020 – August 31, 2020
- President: Rodrigo Duterte
- Preceded by: Position created
- Succeeded by: Joel Garganera (as Cebu City Emergency Operations Center deputy implementer)

30th Chief of Staff of the Armed Forces of the Philippines
- In office May 18, 2002 – September 10, 2002
- President: Gloria Macapagal Arroyo
- Preceded by: Diomedio Villanueva
- Succeeded by: Benjamin Defensor Jr.

Personal details
- Born: Roy Agullana Cimatu; July 4, 1946 (age 80) Bangui, Ilocos Norte, Philippines
- Spouse: Fe Aguillon
- Children: Dennis Cimatu
- Education: Philippine Military Academy; United States Army Command and General Staff College; Ateneo de Manila University
- Awards: Gawad Mabini Grand Cross

Military service
- Allegiance: Philippines
- Branch/service: Philippine Army
- Years of service: 1970–2002
- Rank: General
- Commands: Chief of Staff, Armed Forces of the Philippines; AFP Southern Command; 4th Infantry Division, PA; 11th Infantry Brigade, 3ID, PA
- Battles/wars: Moro conflict Communist rebellion in the Philippines; Operation Enduring Freedom

Roy Agullana Cimatu (Tagalog pronunciation: [sɪˈmatu], born July 4, 1946) is a retired Philippine Army general who served as the Secretary of Environment and Natural Resources from 2017 to 2022 in the Cabinet of President Rodrigo Duterte. He previously served as the Chief of Staff of the Armed Forces of the Philippines from May to September 2002 under President Gloria Macapagal Arroyo. After his retirement from the military, President Arroyo appointed him as the Special Envoy to the Middle East during the Iraq War.

== Early life and education ==
Roy Cimatu was born on July 4, 1946, in Bangui, Ilocos Norte, the third child of war veteran Fidel Magarro Cimatu Sr. and public school teacher Clara Agullana.His birth was timing to the Proclamation of Philippine Independence from the United States, which also marks the birth of the Republic of the Philippines. His father joined the guerilla movement and the 15th Infantry of the United States Armed Forces in the Philippines at the Battle of Bessang Pass during World War II. He completed his elementary education at Bangui Elementary School, and completed high school at Bangui National High School.

Cimatu studied engineering for two years at the National University in Manila before taking and passing the entrance exam for the Philippine Military Academy. He took the Infantry Officers Advanced Course with the Philippine Army Training Command and graduated from the Academy as a second lieutenant of the Magiting Class of 1970 and topped his batch and received the highest grade of 97.27%. He then enrolled at the Aerostar Flying School to become a certified helicopter and fixed-wing aircraft pilot. He also trained at the United States Army Command and General Staff College at Fort Leavenworth in Kansas, U.S.

Cimatu has a master's degree in Business Administration from Ateneo de Manila University.

== Career ==
=== Armed Forces of the Philippines (AFP) ===
Cimatu spent most of his military career in Mindanao. After graduating from the Philippine Military Academy in 1970, he was immediately assigned in Cotabato City as platoon leader and executive officer of the Alpha Company of the 11th Infantry Battalion under the 3rd Infantry Division.

As Commander of the 4th Infantry Division of the Philippine Army based in Cagayan de Oro from 1999 to 2001, Cimatu led the 2000 Philippine campaign against the Moro Islamic Liberation Front which resulted in the successful capture of most of the 46 camps of the Moro Islamic Liberation Front in Lanao del Sur and Maguindanao. He earned the moniker "General Pacman" for his efficiency during the "all-out war" launched by President Joseph Estrada versus the MILF rebels.

In 2001, Cimatu was appointed as the Commanding General of the Armed Forces of the Philippines Southern Command (SOUTHCOM) based in Zamboanga City (now AFP Western Mindanao Command). During his short stint as Southcom chief, he took part in the Balikatan 02-1 military exercises between the Philippines and the United States which took place for the first time in Basilan amid the U.S.-led war on terror.

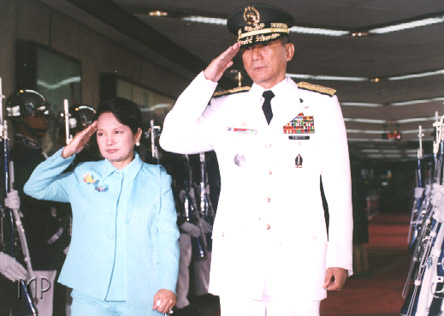
Then-Chief of Staff Cimatu with then-President Gloria Macapagal-Arroyo in May 2002

In May 2002, President Gloria Macapagal Arroyo appointed Cimatu as the 30th AFP Chief of Staff citing his accomplishments in his 36 years of military service. As the AFP chief, Cimatu crafted and implemented a comprehensive anti-terrorist campaign plan to break the backbone of the Abu Sayyaf and to decimate other terror groups in the country. He spearheaded Operation Endgame in Sulu under Operation Enduring Freedom that eventually led to the killing of Abu Sayyaf leader Abu Sabaya in June 2002. Cimatu retired on September 10, 2002, and was replaced by Benjamin Defensor Jr. as AFP chief.

As a former chief of staff, Cimatu was accused by former AFP budget officer Col. George Rabusa of receiving send-off money or pabaon when he retired in September 2002. During the Senate hearing on the 2011 Armed Forces of the Philippines corruption scandal, Rabusa said the retiring AFP chiefs, which also included Diomedio Villanueva and Angelo Reyes, received at least ₱50 million from the pabaon system. The Department of Justice filed plunder charges against Cimatu and other high-ranking AFP officials in June 2011 for allegedly accumulating ill-gotten wealth sourced from the conversion of military funds. Rodrigo Duterte, then the mayor of Davao City, defended Cimatu from the allegations. In his weekend television program Gikan Sa Masa, Para Sa Masa, Duterte said "I do not believe that General Roy Cimatu has millions."

An April 2013 decision by the Office of the Ombudsman recommended the dismissal of the plunder charges for lack of evidence.

His awards in the military are:

- - Gawad Mabini
- Luzon Anti Dissidence Campaign Medal
- Visayas Anti-Dissidence Campaign Medal
- Mindanao Anti-dissidence Campaign Medal
- Disaster Relief & Rehabilitation Operation Ribbon
- Military Commendation Medal
- Silver Wing Medal
- Outstanding Achievement Medal
- Long Service Medal
- Anti-Dissidence Campaign Medal
- Distinguished Service Star
- Distinguished Conduct Star
- Bronze Cross Medal
- Military Merit Medal (Philippines)
- Scout Ranger Qualification Badge

=== Special envoy ===
Upon his retirement from military service, President Arroyo appointed Cimatu as Special Envoy to the Middle East and head of the Middle East Preparedness Team (MEPT) in 2002 that was tasked to look after the safety and welfare of overseas Filipino workers in the Middle East amid the tensions brought by the Iraq War. He was the chief negotiator for the release of kidnapped Filipinos in Iraq including the truck driver Angelo de la Cruz who was abducted by Iraqi insurgents near the city of Fallujah in 2004.

As Arroyo's envoy, Cimatu also negotiated for the surrender of 326 AFP officers who joined the Magdalo Group in the Oakwood mutiny in July 2003. Cimatu served as Special Envoy to the Middle East for President Arroyo until 2010 and for President Benigno Aquino III from 2010 to June 30, 2011.

On October 11, 2016, Cimatu was reappointed to the same position as Special Envoy to the Middle East by President Rodrigo Duterte. As Duterte's special envoy, he was part of the President's delegation during the state visits to Saudi Arabia, Bahrain and Qatar from April 10–16, 2017.

On April 23, 2017, during the opening ceremony of Palarong Pambansa 2017 in San Jose de Buenavista, Antique, President Duterte introduced Cimatu as a new Cabinet member and announced his appointment as Special Envoy for Overseas Filipino Worker (OFW) Refugees who is tasked to assist distressed Filipino workers in the Middle East.

=== Department of Environment and Natural Resources ===
Cimatu assumed the leadership of the Department of Environment and Natural Resources on May 8, 2017, when he was appointed by President Rodrigo Duterte to replace Gina Lopez; his appointment was confirmed on October 4, 2017, by the Commission on Appointments. He is the second retired general to head the department after former AFP chief and Defense Secretary Angelo Reyes who was President Arroyo's DENR Secretary from 2006 to 2007. As Environment Secretary, Cimatu said he will be reviewing the mine closures ordered by his predecessor. He said "balancing environmental care and responsible mining can be done".

The Nickelodeon Theme Park in Coron, which Lopez blocked, was given the green light by Department of Tourism Wanda Teo after a month of Lopez' rejection by the Commission on Appointments. Cimatu however, vowed for a thorough inquiry regarding the theme park to ensure the conservation and protection of the area stating 'that we continue to conserve and protect this last bastion of coastal biodiversity in Palawan'. In a statement, Cimatu said he has ordered his department's Biodiversity Management Bureau, Environmental Management Bureau, and MiMaRoPa office "to undertake an inquiry into this proposed plan, so that at the outset we can ensure that we continue to conserve and protect this last bastion of coastal biodiversity in Palawan."

Duterte, satisfied with the Boracay rehabilitation, gave Cimatu a more challenging task of rehabilitating the long-neglected Manila bay and vowed a serious cleanup on Manila Bay coastline which stretches 190 kilo meters across three regions from Cavite in Calabarzon, National Capital Region (NCR) or the Metro Manila area, and Bulacan and Pampanga in Central Luzon. Furthermore, Cimatu stated in a 2019 speech: "In Manila Bay, we have to break down in class SB status the fatal coliform of 330 million spm per 100 ml. of Manila Bay and the required effort to clean and rehabilitate Manila Bay would take around 330 times as that of Boracay," it indicates that the fatal coliform in Manila bay is far more than what was present in Boracay, despite the overwhelming potential hurdles, the challenge was wholeheartedly accepted by Cimatu stating: "We are in the limelight now of what we want to do with Manila Bay. The President has shown confidence in our competence after what we have done in Boracay."

In 2019, Cimatu spearheaded the task of rehabilitating Manila bay, which has been very polluted due to the years of neglect by authorities. Under his leadership, the DENR has begun to inspect establishments near the bay and has given orders for them to put up their own sewage treatment plants. Part of their initiative includes taking water samples of the establishments' wastewater discharges. The rehabilitation was dubbed "The Battle for Manila Bay" by Cimatu. It began on January 27, 2018, wherein around 5,000 people have taken part carrying shovels, broomsticks, and sacks to assist in cleaning up their long-neglected bay.

=== COVID-19 Pandemic ===
On June 22, 2020, President Duterte assigned Cimatu to oversee the COVID-19 response in Cebu City due to city having the highest number of confirmed coronavirus cases in the country.

=== Cebu City Environment Consultant ===
On August 30, 2022, Cebu City Mayor Michael Rama appointed Cimatu as environment consultant to help realize his vision for the city to be Singapore-like. Cimatu’s task is to help and coordinate with the city on the restoration of waterways, address flooding, and find possible potable water sources to address scarcity.

== Personal life ==
Cimatu was married to businesswoman Fe Aguillon of Antique with whom he has one son, Dennis, who studied architecture at the University of Santo Tomas. Aguillon-Cimatu died on February 20, 2021. His brother, Fidel Cimatu Jr., is the incumbent municipal mayor of their hometown Bangui, Ilocos Norte who also graduated from the Philippine Military Academy in 1977.

Military offices
Preceded by Diomedio Villanueva	Chief of Staff of the Armed Forces of the Philippines; 2002	Succeeded by Benjamin Defensor Jr.
Political offices
Preceded by Gina Lopez	Secretary of Environment and Natural Resources; 2017–2022	Succeeded by Jim O. Sampulna (acting)
Order of precedence
Preceded by John Castriciones as Secretary of Agrarian Reform	Order of Precedence of the Philippines as Secretary of Environment and Natural Resources	Succeeded by Eduardo Año as Secretary of the Interior and Local Government
