= Diomedio Villanueva =

Former Filipino general

Postmaster General
- In office 2003–2010
- President: Gloria Macapagal-Arroyo
- Vice President: Noli De Castro; Teofisto Guingona

Chief of Staff of the Armed Forces of the Philippines
- In office March 17, 2001 – May 18, 2002
- President: Gloria Macapagal-Arroyo
- Vice President: Teofisto Guingona Jr.
- Preceded by: Angelo Reyes
- Succeeded by: Roy Cimatu

Commanding General of the Philippine Army
- In office 2000–2001
- President: Joseph Ejercito Estrada
- Vice President: Gloria Macapagal-Arroyo
- Preceded by: Angelo Reyes
- Succeeded by: Jaime de los Santos

Commander of AFP South Luzon Command
- In office May 1, 2000 – October 22, 2000
- President: Joseph Ejercito Estrada
- Succeeded by: Ernesto Carolina

Commander of AFP Southern Command
- In office 1999 – March 16, 2000
- President: Joseph Ejercito Estrada
- Preceded by: Edgardo Espinosa
- Succeeded by: Gregorio Camiling

Personal details
- Died: May 1, 2023 (aged 76) Libingan ng mga Bayani
- Resting place: Libingan ng mga Bayani, Fort Bonifacio, Taguig
- Education: Bachelor of Science Degree
- Alma mater: Philippine Military Academy (1968)
- Occupation: Soldier
- Profession: Soldier

Military service
- Allegiance: Philippines
- Branch/service: Philippine Army
- Years of service: 1968 - 2002
- Rank: General
- Unit: 1st Infantry Division
- Commands: Armed Forces of the Philippines Philippine Army; South Luzon Command; Southern Command 1st Infantry Division
- Battles/wars: Anti-Communist Campaign All Out war with MILF (2000) Anti-Terrorism Campaign (1999)

Diomedio Villanueva was retired Philippine Army General who served as Chief of Staff of the Armed Forces of the Philippines in 2001 - 2002. He succeeded General Angelo Reyes who was appointed as Secretary of National Defense upon his mandatory retirement.

== See also ==
- Chief of Staff of the Armed Forces of the Philippines
- Commanding General of the Philippine Army
- AFP Southern Luzon Command
- Commanders of the AFP Western Mindanao Command
- AFP Southern Command
