= Benjamin Defensor Jr. =

Filipino retired air force general

Benjamin Defensor AFP (Ret.)
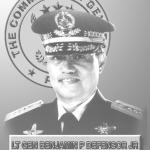

Vice Chairman of the Clark Development Corporation
- In office 2003–2010
- President: Gloria Macapagal-Arroyo

31st Chief of Staff of the Armed Forces of the Philippines
- In office September 12, 2002 – November 28, 2002
- President: Gloria Macapagal-Arroyo
- Preceded by: Roy Cimatu
- Succeeded by: Dionisio Santiago

Commanding General of the Philippine Air Force
- In office January 2000 – September 2002
- President: Gloria Macapagal-Arroyo; Joseph Ejercito Estrada
- Preceded by: William Hotchkiss III
- Succeeded by: Nestor Santillan

Personal details
- Born: Benjamin Defensor Jr. September 12, 1946 (age 79) Iloilo City, Iloilo Province, Western Visayas
- Spouse: Margaret Defensor
- Parents: Atty. Benjamin Defensor Sr. (father); Dimpna Palma - Defensor (mother)
- Relatives: Miriam Defensor Santiago (sister); Narciso Santiago (Brother-in-law)
- Education: Masters in Business and Public Management; Masters in Mass Communication; Bachelor of Science Degree
- Alma mater: Air University; De La Salle University; University of the Philippines; Philippine Military Academy (1969)
- Occupation: Soldier
- Profession: Combat Pilot
- Awards: Presidential Award for Military Leadership; Golden Aviator Award for Leadership and Command; PAF Flying School for leadership excellence

Military service
- Allegiance: Philippines
- Branch/service: Philippine Air Force
- Years of service: 1969 – 2002
- Rank: General
- Commands: Office of the Chief of Staff, AFP; Office of the Air Force Commanding General; PAF Tactical Operations Command; 100th Training Wing; Clark Air Base

Benjamin Palma Defensor Jr., is a retired Philippine Air Force General who served as 31st Chief of Staff of the Armed Forces of the Philippines for 69 days, the shortest stint of a Chief of Staff. He succeeded General Roy Cimatu of the Philippine Army on September 12, 2002, until his mandatory retirement at the age of 56 on November 28, 2002. He is the fourth Chief of Staff coming from the Air Force which he was the commanding general from 2000 – September 2002.

== Early years ==
Defensor was born in Iloilo City, Iloilo, Philippines on September 12, 1946, to parents Benjamin Defensor Sr. a local judge and Dimpna Palma a college dean. He is the second eldest among the seven siblings which include his famous elder sister and late Senator Miriam Defensor Santiago. He entered Philippine Military Academy and graduated in 1969.

== See also ==
- Chief of Staff of the Armed Forces of the Philippines
- Commanding General Philippine Air Force

Military offices
Preceded by Roy Cimatu	Chief of Staff of the Armed Forces of the Philippines; September 2002 - November 2002	Succeeded by Dionisio Santiago
Preceded by Willie Florendo	Commanding General Philippine Air Force; July 2000 - September 2002	Succeeded by Nestor Santillan
Political offices
Preceded by	Vice Chairman of the Board of Clark Development Corporation; 2003–2017	Succeeded by
