= Generoso Senga =

34th Chief of Staff of the Armed Forces of the Philippines
- In office August 15, 2005 – July 22, 2006
- President: Gloria Macapagal-Arroyo
- Preceded by: Efren Abu
- Succeeded by: Hermogenes Esperon Jr.

Commanding General, Philippine Army
- In office November 3, 2004 – August 17, 2005
- President: Gloria Macapagal-Arroyo
- Preceded by: Efren Abu
- Succeeded by: Alexander Yano

Commander, AFP Southern Command
- In office 2003 – November 2, 2004
- President: Gloria Macapagal-Arroyo
- Preceded by: Roy Kyamko
- Succeeded by: Alberto Braganza

Personal details
- Education: Philippine Military Academy
- Occupation: Army Soldier
- Profession: Soldier
- Awards: Distinguished Service Star w/ 2 Gold Anahaw Leaf; Bronze Cross Medals; Military Merit Medals; Wounded Personnel Medals

Military service
- Allegiance: Philippines
- Branch/service: Philippine Army
- Years of service: 1972 - 2006
- Rank: General
- Unit: Assistant Chief of Operations J3, AFP Northern Luzon Command; 7th Infantry Division 27th Infantry Battalion
- Commands: Armed Forces of the Philippines Philippine Army; AFP Southern Command; 6th Infantry Division; 701st Infantry Brigade; Army Counter-Terrorist Group 59th Infantry Battalion

Generoso Senga, is a Philippine Army general who served as 34th chief of staff of the Armed Forces of the Philippines from August 15, 2005, to July 22, 2006. He was commanding general of the Philippine Army prior to his appointment as chief of staff by President Gloria Macapagal-Arroyo.

== Early life and education ==
Senga was born on July 21, 1950, in Marikina, Rizal (now Metro Manila).

He attended Philippine Military Academy and graduated in 1972. He earned a master's degree in Business Administration at Ateneo de Manila University.

He also took law at Ateneo de Manila University.

=== Military service ===
Senga was commissioned as second lieutenant in 1972.

He was named assistant chief of operations of the Philippine Army, commander of Counter-Terrorist Group, and later commander of 701st Infantry Brigade based in Davao. He was selected by then AFP chief of staff General Angelo Reyes as AFP spokesperson. He was later named chief of staff of the Philippine Army and later deputy chief of staff for civil military operations, AFP. He was later named commander of 6th Infantry Division based in Awang, Maguindanao and subseuently commander of the AFP Southern Command. He was appointed as commanding general, Philippine Army.

=== Botched coup ===
During his term as AFP chief of staff, several senior officers planned a coup in February 2006 to oust President Gloria Macapagal-Arroyo. However, this was discovered abruptly stopped when President Arroyo declared a week long State of Emergency. 38 officers and 27 foot soldiers were courtmartialed.

=== Later career ===
Senga was appointed as ambassador to Iran in 2008 by President Arroyo until 2010.

== Personal life ==
Senga is married to Pilar Pigason-Senga of Masbate and they have three children.
