= National Intelligence Coordinating Agency =

Primary intelligence gathering and analysis arm of the Philippine government

- Pambansang Ahensiya sa Ugnayang Intelihensiya
- Official Seal

Agency overview
- Formed: July 10, 1949; 77 years ago
- Preceding agencies: National Intelligence and Security Authority (NISA); Civil Intelligence and Security Agency (CISA)
- Jurisdiction: Government of the Philippines
- Headquarters: Quezon City, Philippines
- Motto: Kaalaman ay Kaligtasan (Knowledge is Safety)
- Employees: 910 (2024)
- Agency executive: Ricardo de Leon, Director-General
- Parent agency: Office of the President of the Philippines
- Website: Official website

The National Intelligence Coordinating Agency (NICA; Filipino: Pambansang Ahensiya sa Ugnayang Intelihensiya) is the primary intelligence gathering and analysis arm of the government of the Philippines in charge of carrying out overt, covert, and clandestine intelligence activities. The NICA directs, coordinates, and integrates all intelligence activities, both foreign and domestic, concerning national security, serving as the leading intelligence collector of the national government, focusing on the country's strategic intelligence requirements. It is mandated to prepare intelligence estimate on local and foreign situation for the formulation of national security policies by the President and the National Security Council.

The agency also serves as the focal point for the government's counterintelligence activities and operation; acts as Secretariat to the Anti-Terrorism Council; and serves as head of the National Task Force to End Local Communist Armed Conflict's Situation Awareness and Knowledge Management Cluster.

The NICA is led by a Director-General, who reports directly to the president of the Philippines, and is assisted by two Deputy Director-Generals. Its headquarters is located in Quezon City, with regional offices located all over the country and foreign stations in countries of interest to the Philippine government.

The National Intelligence Committee, chaired by the Director-General, serves as the advisory body of NICA.

== History ==
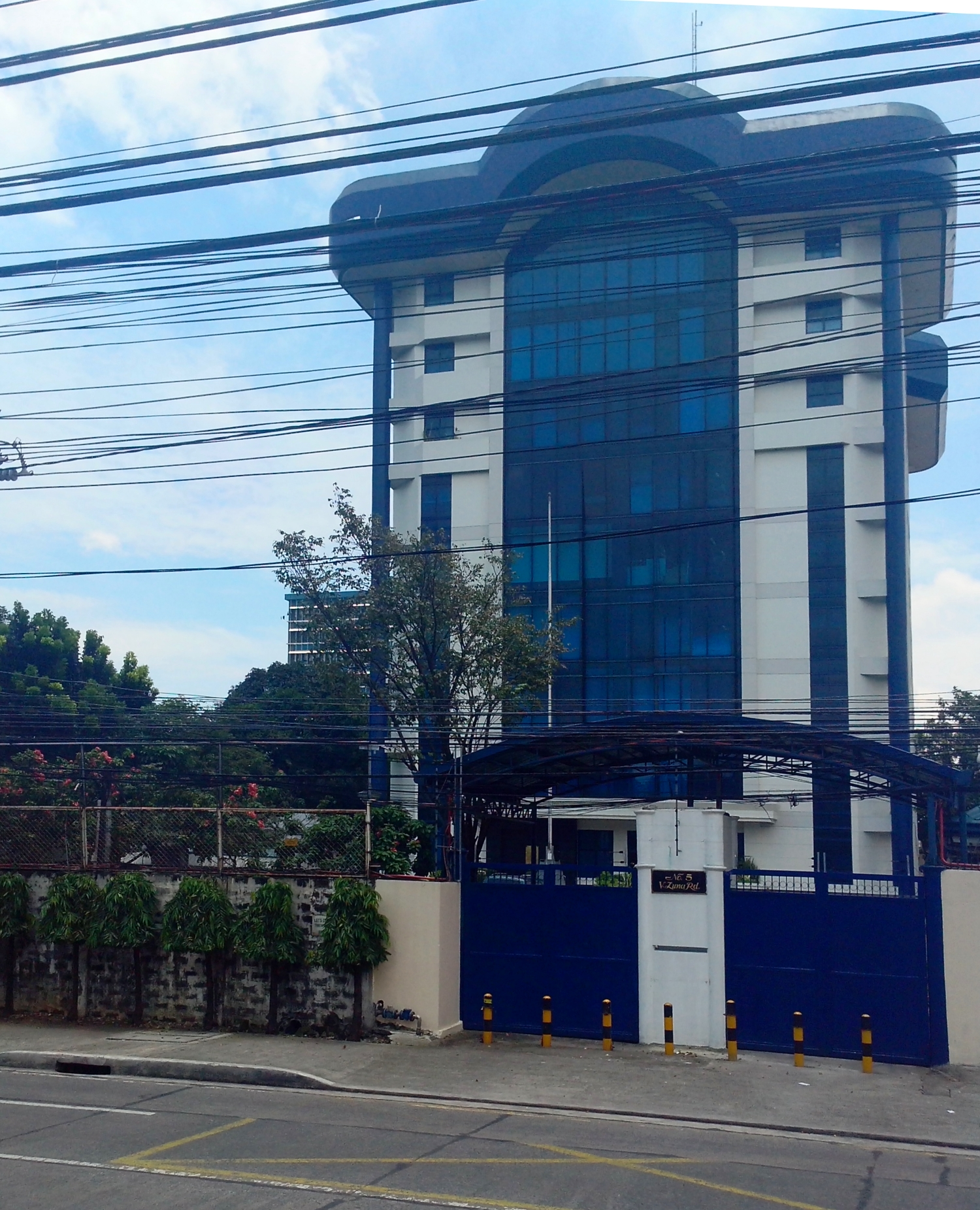
Main office of NICA along V. Luna Avenue in Quezon City

Founded in July 10, 1949, the NICA was created by President Elpidio Quirino under the authority of Executive Order No. 235. In 1954, the Government Survey and Reorganization Commission ordered the expansion of the powers of NICA. The agency was reorganized in 1958 under Executive Order No. 291 by President Carlos P. Garcia.

The NICA was abolished on November 16, 1972, by President Ferdinand Marcos under Presidential Decree No. 51, and was replaced by the National Intelligence and Security Authority (NISA), which was designated as the principal intelligence agency, and the Civil Intelligence and Security Agency (CISA), which was tasked with counterintelligence and supervision of all civil security units in Philippine government offices. The NISA was then headed by Gen. Fabian Ver and was alleged to be responsible for various human rights abuses, primarily during the martial law period. The regime of President Marcos, through Gen. Ver, was believed by human rights groups to have used NISA to spy on, abduct and eliminate persons opposing the autocracy of President Marcos in the 1970s and the 1980s, as the regime's secret police.

In 1978, the NISA was designated as the focal point for all intelligence activities involving national security and supervisor of other intelligence agencies under the Office of the President.

In 1987, shortly after the People Power Revolution which had led to a peaceful removal of President Marcos from office, his successor President Corazon Aquino issued Executive Order No. 246 which abolished NISA and CISA and reestablished NICA. The NICA then refocused its priorities in tackling the communist insurgency in the Philippines.

In 1990, the National Security Advisor was given responsibility to oversee management and control of NICA to be responsive to the needs of the President and the National Security Council.

NICA agents were responsible for the arrest of several Abu Sayyaf members, including Al Qaeda-linked bomber Abdulmukim Edris in November 2002.

In 2005, the agency established two directorates to conduct economic intelligence and counterintelligence activities.

On February 1, 2006, President Gloria Macapagal-Arroyo issued Executive Order No. 492, which ordered the NICA to activate the National Maritime Aerial Reconnaissance and Surveillance Center (NMARSC). The NMARSC was designated as the primary imagery intelligence provider for the Philippine intelligence community and was tasked to operate unmanned aerial vehicles under the supervision and oversight of the National Security Adviser.

On March 6, 2007, President Arroyo signed Republic Act No. 9372, also known as the Human Security Act of 2007, which designates the NICA as the Secretariat of the Anti-Terrorism Council (ATC).

In 2011, Juan Ponce Enrile challenged President Aquino to declassify intelligence files from the former NISA.

In 2018, then-House of Representatives Majority Floor Leader Rodolfo Fariñas filed House Bill No. 7111, also known as the Foreign Electronic Surveillance Act. The bill would have allowed NICA agents to covertly conduct electronic surveillance operations against foreign countries, terrorists and private groups without the need of having a warrant or a court order in an emergency situation. A warrantless operation outside the Philippine territory would also need the approval by the director-general of the NICA and the secretary of the Department of Justice (DOJ). However, since it was not enacted by the end of the 17th Congress, the bill is already considered "dead" in the House of Representatives Committee on National Defense and Security.

On June 3, 2020, President Rodrigo Duterte signed Republic Act No. 11479, also known as the Anti-Terrorism Act of 2020, which repealed the Human Security Act of 2007. Pursuant to the Anti-Terrorism Act of 2020, the NICA remains as the Secretariat of the ATC. However, NICA has also now been tasked to provide its recommendation on an application for proscription seeking to declare any individual or group as a terrorist before the Court of Appeals. Such application for proscription may only be filed by the DOJ, subject to the authority of the ATC.

On January 3, 2024, President Bongbong Marcos ordered a revamp to the NICA through Executive Order No. 54, which would create the Office of the Deputy Director General (ODDG) for Cyber and Emerging Threats to handle and address counter-intelligence and counter-measures against cybersecurity threats.

In November 2025, ACT Teachers Rep. Antonio Tinio raised concerns on why the agency was given half of the proposed 2026 budget to confidential and intelligence funds (CIF), when NICA was given budgets that only in the millions.

== Mandate ==
The NICA is mandated to:

- conduct and coordinate national intelligence activities;
- fulfill strategic intelligence needs of the Philippine government;
- provide the National Intelligence Estimate for purposes of national security policymaking;
- lead counterintelligence activities;
- serve as the Secretariat of the Anti-Terrorism Council; and
- serve as the Head of the Situational Awareness and Knowledge Management Cluster of the National Task Force to End Local Communist Armed Conflict.

== Organization ==
The NICA is organized into the following divisions and directorates:

- Office of the Director-General – led by the Director-General
- Directorate of Operations – led by the Assistant Director-General for Operations
- Directorate of Production – led by the Assistant Director-General for Production
- Directorate of Administration – led by the Assistant Director-General for Administration
- Management and Planning Office
- Office of the Comptroller
- In June, 2024, Marcos Jr. appointed Jesus Leonardo Auxilio as Executive director of the National Maritime Aerial Reconnaissance and Surveillance Center of the NICA.
- Various field stations in various regions – led by its respective Regional Directors

== Directors-General ==
| Image | Name | Start | End | President | Notes |
|---|---|---|---|---|---|
| | Nicanor Jimenez | ? | 1961 | Garcia | |
| | Marcos Soliman | 1961 | 1966 | Macapagal | |
| | Marcos Soliman | 1961 | 1966 | F. E. Marcos | |
| | Segundo Gazmin | 1966 | 1970 | F. E. Marcos | |
| | Marcos Soliman | 1970 | 1972 | F. E. Marcos | |
| | Santiago Barangan | 1972 | 1972 | F. E. Marcos | |
| | Fabian Ver | 1972 | October 24, 1984 | F. E. Marcos | as National Intelligence and Security Authority (NISA) |
| | Vicente S. Yumul | October 24, 1984 | | F. E. Marcos | |
| | Vicente S. Yumul | October 24, 1984 | | C. Aquino | |
| | Jose T. Almonte | | | C. Aquino | |
| | Alfredo Filler | | | Ramos | former Vice Chief of Staff, AFP |
| | Cesar Fortuno | 1998 | 2001 | Estrada | |
| | Cesar Garcia | 2001 | August 20, 2008 | Arroyo | |
| | Pedro Cabuay | August 20, 2008 | July 9, 2010 | Arroyo | |
| | Trifonio Salazar | July 9, 2010 | November 26, 2013 | B. Aquino | Resigned |
| | Ager Ontog | November 26, 2013 | June 30, 2016 | B. Aquino | |
| | Alex Paul Monteagudo | June 30, 2016 | June 30, 2022 | Duterte | |
| | Ricardo de Leon | June 30, 2022 | present | F. R. Marcos | |
