= Ernesto Carolina =

Filipino military leader

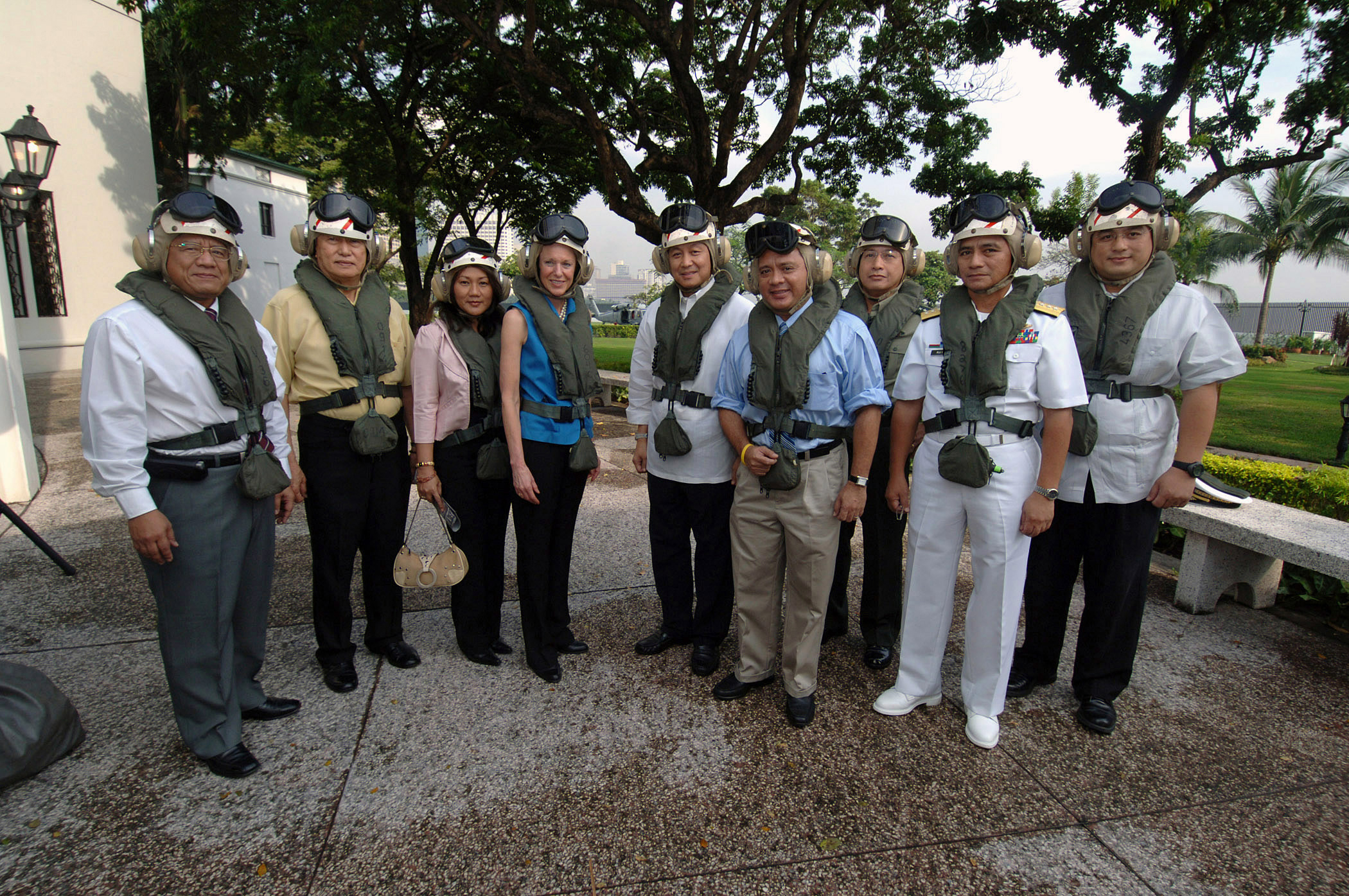
Ernesto Carolina in a group picture (middle, white shirt)

Lieutenant General Ernesto G. Carolina served in various civilian positions in government. He was Presidential Assistant and Chairman of the Joint Defense Assessment Planning and Implementation Group (JDA-PAIG), Office of the President; Undersecretary for Philippine Defense Reform Program, Department of National Defense (DND); Undersecretary for Civil, Veterans and Reserve Affairs, DND; and Administrator, Philippine Veterans Affairs Office, He held the rank of Undersecretary of the Department of National Defense for nineteen (19) years up to June 30, 2022. .

== Family background ==
Lt Gen Carolina is the eldest of nine siblings: three brothers, including himself and six sisters. All nine of them earned academic degrees. His mother, his only living parent, resides in the United States with his sister.

Carolina is married to Aurora B. Dominguez and has four children with her. He has a son who is a commissioned officer in the Philippine Army.

== Academic background ==
A graduate of the Philippine Military Academy Class of 1970, Undersecretary Carolina obtained a master's degree in business economics from the University of Asia & the Pacific and completed the academic requirements for a master's degree in mathematics from the University of the Philippines. He also attended numerous training programs, seminars and conferences, both local and international.

== Military career ==
In 2003, Carolina retired from the Armed Forces of the Philippines (AFP) with the rank of Lieutenant General. Among the many important posts he held are the following: Commander, 78th Infantry Battalion, Philippine Army (PA); Chief, AFP Liaison Office for Legislative Affairs and AFP Spokesman in concurrent capacity; Chief of Staff, 4th Infantry Division, PA; Assistant Chief of Staff for Personnel, G1, PA; Assistant Chief of Staff for Comptrollership, G6, PA; Commanding General, 401st Infantry Brigade, PA; Deputy Chief of Staff for Civil Military Operations, J7, AFP; Commanding General, 7th Infantry Division, PA; Commander, Southern Luzon Command (SOLCOM), AFP; Commander, South Command (SOUTHCOM), AFP in Mindanao; and The Deputy Chief of Staff, AFP.
