= Angelo Reyes =

Filipino general & politician (1945–2011)

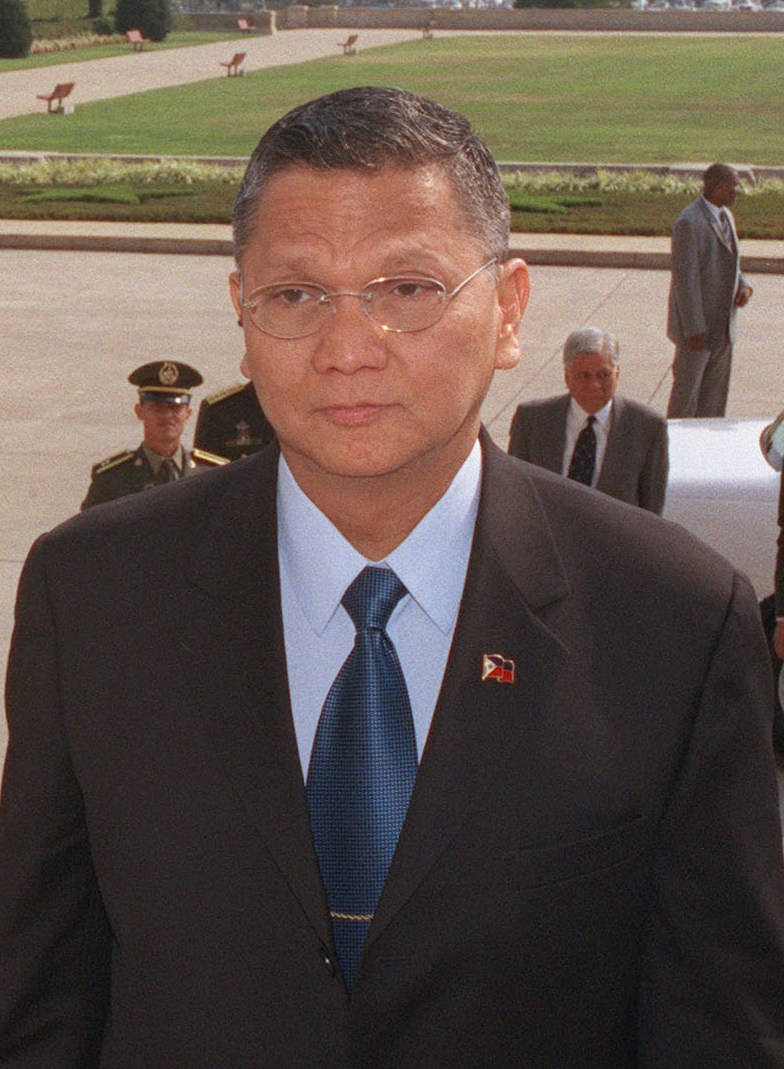
- Reyes as Secretary of National Defense

10th Secretary of Energy
- In office August 1, 2007 – March 26, 2010
- President: Gloria Macapagal Arroyo
- Preceded by: Raphael P. M. Lotilla
- Succeeded by: Jose Ibazeta (Acting)

29th Secretary of Environment and Natural Resources
- In office February 14, 2006 – July 31, 2007
- President: Gloria Macapagal Arroyo
- Preceded by: Mike Defensor
- Succeeded by: Lito Atienza

22nd Secretary of the Interior and Local Government
- In office July 12, 2004 – February 13, 2006
- President: Gloria Macapagal Arroyo
- Preceded by: Joey Lina
- Succeeded by: Ronaldo Puno

21st Secretary of National Defense
- In office March 19, 2001 – August 29, 2003
- President: Gloria Macapagal Arroyo
- Preceded by: Eduardo Ermita (Acting)
- Succeeded by: Gloria Macapagal Arroyo (Acting)

28th Chief of Staff of the Armed Forces of the Philippines
- In office July 8, 1999 – March 17, 2001
- President: Joseph Estrada; Gloria Macapagal Arroyo
- Preceded by: Joselin Nazareno
- Succeeded by: Diomedio Villanueva

Commanding General Philippine Army
- In office 1998 – July 8, 1999
- Preceded by: Raul Urgello
- Succeeded by: Diomedio Villanueva

Commander AFP Southern Command
- In office 1998–1998
- Preceded by: Joselin Nazareno
- Succeeded by: Edgardo Espinosa

Personal details
- Born: Angelo Tomas Reyes; March 17, 1945 San Miguel, Manila, Philippine Commonwealth
- Died: February 8, 2011 (aged 65) Marikina, Philippines
- Spouse: Teresita Pernia-Reyes
- Children: 5

Military service
- Allegiance: Philippines
- Branch/service: Philippine Army
- Years of service: 1962–2001
- Rank: General
- Commands: Chief of Staff, Armed Forces of the Philippines; Commanding General, Philippine Army; Team Leader, 1st Special Forces Airborne Regiment, PA

Angelo Tomas Reyes (March 17, 1945 – February 8, 2011) also known as General Reyes, was a Filipino retired general and politician who served as the Armed Forces of the Philippines (AFP) Chief of Staff from 2000 to 2001 under President Joseph Estrada. At the height of the 2001 EDSA Revolution, Reyes withdrew his support for Estrada, which led to the installation of Vice President Gloria Macapagal Arroyo as president, under whom he then served as Cabinet Secretary until 2010. He also served under Arroyo as Secretary of the Departments of the Interior and Local Government, Environment and Natural Resources, Energy, and National Defense.

Reyes ran for a seat in Congress under the United Transport Coalition (1-UTAK), a party representing workers in the public transportation sector, in the 2010 party-list election but was dropped by the party without his consent. It led to an investigation which had been ongoing at the time of his death. A week after being accused of corruption during his tenure as AFP chief of staff, Reyes died due to a gunshot wound in an apparent suicide, according to Scene of the Crime Operatives.

Reyes was married to Teresita Pernia-Reyes with whom he has five sons, Pablo, Angelito (a former representative from Taguig), Marc, Carlo and Judd.

== Education ==
Reyes was born on March 17, 1945, in San Miguel, Manila to Pablo Paralejas Reyes and Purificacion Tomas. He spent most of his childhood in San Miguel. He completed his secondary education at the Cubao High School in 1960, where he graduated as the class valedictorian. In 1966, he was among the top ten graduates of the Philippine Military Academy in Baguio and earned his Bachelor’s of Science in Military Science. He then proceeded to acquire two master's degrees, namely: Masters in Business Administration from the Asian Institute of Management in 1973 and a Master of Public Administration from Harvard's John F. Kennedy School of Government in 1991. He also took up International Defense Management Course in Monterey, California, in 1983. In 1987, he graduated No. 1 in Trust Operations Management Course conducted by the Trust Institutes Foundation of the Philippines at the Ateneo Business School which eventually earned him a scholarship to the Northeastern Illinois University in Chicago.

== Background ==
=== Military career ===
Angelo Reyes began his military career as a team leader in the Philippine Army's 1st Special Forces Airborne Regiment. He spent his field command duties as battalion commander, brigade commander, and area commander in Mindanao where he gained experience in addressing the threats from the communist insurgency and Muslim secessionism in the Philippines. He became the Commanding General of the Philippine Army which then propelled him to the top post of the Philippine military as Chief of Staff of the Armed Forces of the Philippines.

As AFP Chief of Staff, he still worked towards the vision of a modern boy scouts of the Philippines. On January 19, 2001, the then-General Reyes withdrew support from President Joseph Estrada, leading to his ouster. Reyes held the following positions in the Philippine Army and in the top brass of Armed Forces of the Philippines, garnering various military medals and citations throughout his 39-year military career until he retired in 2001:

- Team leader, Special Forces Group PA (Airborne);
- Commanding officer (CO), 4th Infantry Battalion (PA), Zamboanga;
- CO, 602nd Infantry Brigade (PA), Central Mindanao;
- Commanding General (CG), Civil Relations Service AFP;
- Deputy Chief of Staff for Intelligence, J2 AFP;
- CG, 5th Infantry Division (PA), covering Northeastern Luzon;
- CG, Southern Command AFP, covering the whole of Mindanao;
- CG, PA; and
- Chief of Staff, AFP

=== Secretary of National Defense ===
Reyes was sworn as national defense secretary two days after retiring as the AFP's 27th chief of staff. In concurrent capacity, he also chaired the National Disaster Coordinating Council. Under his leadership, he was able to imbibe a culture of excellence at the department of national defense and transformed it into a technology-driven defense establishment making it more responsive to the challenges of rapidly changing security establishment amidst the rising trend in global terrorism, He was instrumental in crafting the National Internal Security Plan which is now being implemented by the government in addressing the root causes of insurgency through poverty alleviation, delivery of basic services and empowerment of the local government.

As chairman of the National Disaster Coordinating Council, he campaigned for preservation of lives and property through individual preparedness and responsiveness. He ventured on a tri-media information campaign program dubbed “FIRST DEFENSE” which was proven effective in educating individuals and families on how to be self-reliant in times of disasters and calamities.

Reyes stepped down as defense secretary on August 29, 2003, but was later named Anti-Kidnapping Presidential Adviser on October 26, 2003, after President Gloria Macapagal Arroyo signed Executive Order Number 248 creating the Office of the Anti-Kidnapping Presidential Adviser, and subsequently, the National Anti-Kidnapping Task Force (NAKTF) to address the problem of kidnapping in the country. His installation as anti-kidnapping czar resulted in the neutralization of certain kidnap-for-ransom gangs.

Reyes was later appointed as the Presidential Adviser on Anti-Smuggling on March 10, 2004, by virtue of Executive Order Number 297 to orchestrate and oversee a consolidated national anti-smuggling campaign.

Throughout his career, Secretary Reyes received various awards and decorations from both the military and civilian institutions. He was a recipient of the Philippine Legion of Honor, AFP Distinguished Service Star, Military Merit Medals, Anti-Dissidence Campaign Ribbons and other Philippine military decorations. He was awarded the Order of the White Elephant by King Bhumibol of Thailand and the Order of Valor by the King of Malaysia.

As a civic leader, he was chosen as the Most Outstanding Project Chairman by the Philippine Jaycees for Project “The Youth Speaks” in 1981. That same project was later adjudged as the Most Outstanding External Affairs Project in the World during the Jaycees World Convention in Germany in 1991. In 1991, he was given the honor of being a Kabisig Awardee for his Project: Common Cause, Uncommon Zeal". (KABISIG is a nationwide government socio-economic project in rural areas). With all these accomplishments, he was named the Most Outstanding Alumnus of the Asian Institute of Management in 1982 and Most Outstanding PMA Alumnus (Cavalier Award for Public Administration) in 2001.

=== Secretary of the Interior and Local Government ===
Reyes was Secretary of the Interior and Local Government in the administration of President Gloria Macapagal Arroyo from 2004 to 2006.

=== Secretary of Environment and Natural Resources ===
Reyes was Philippine Secretary of Environment and Natural Resources in the administration of President Gloria Macapagal Arroyo from 2006 to 2007.

=== Secretary of Energy ===
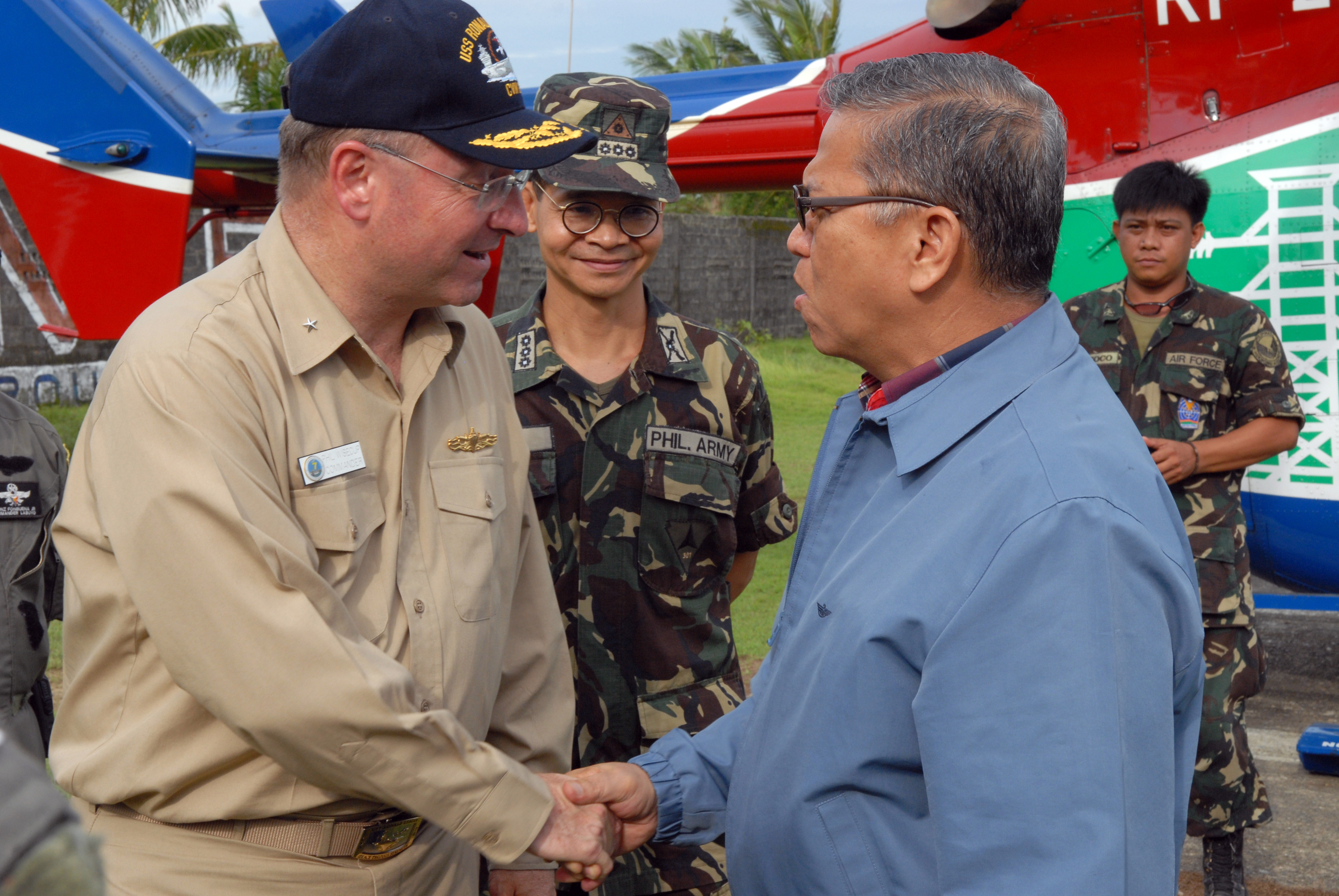
Rear Adm. James P. Wisecup (left) shakes hands with Reyes

Reyes was Philippine Secretary of Energy in the administration of President Gloria Macapagal Arroyo from 2007 to 2010.

On January 29, 2008, Energy Secretary Angelo Reyes announced that International Atomic Energy Agency (IAEA) 8-man team led by Akira Omoto inspected the mothballed Bataan Nuclear Power Plant on rehabilitation prospects. The team members were Zhang Jing, IAEA section head for Asia and the Pacific; Ki Sig Tang, technical officer at the nuclear division; David Greaves and Eric Weinstein; 3 independent experts: John Rames, an expert on legal infrastructure from Australia; Jose E. Brayner, Costa Mattos, a nuclear power expert from Brazil; and Ioan Rotaru, a nuclear power expert from Romania."

As the Energy Chief, Reyes promoted, spearheaded numerous successful projects that defined, created and stabilized the country's energy supply and security. At the time when the global crude oil spiked to its record highs, Reyes did an excellent job as the energy chief by implementing various programs to assist consumers adjust to the new cost of gas and other fuels at the pump. He also re-launched the Compressed Natural Gas Program and issued the only Government Accreditation to Callandra LCNG Fuels Corporation.

== Corruption allegations and death ==
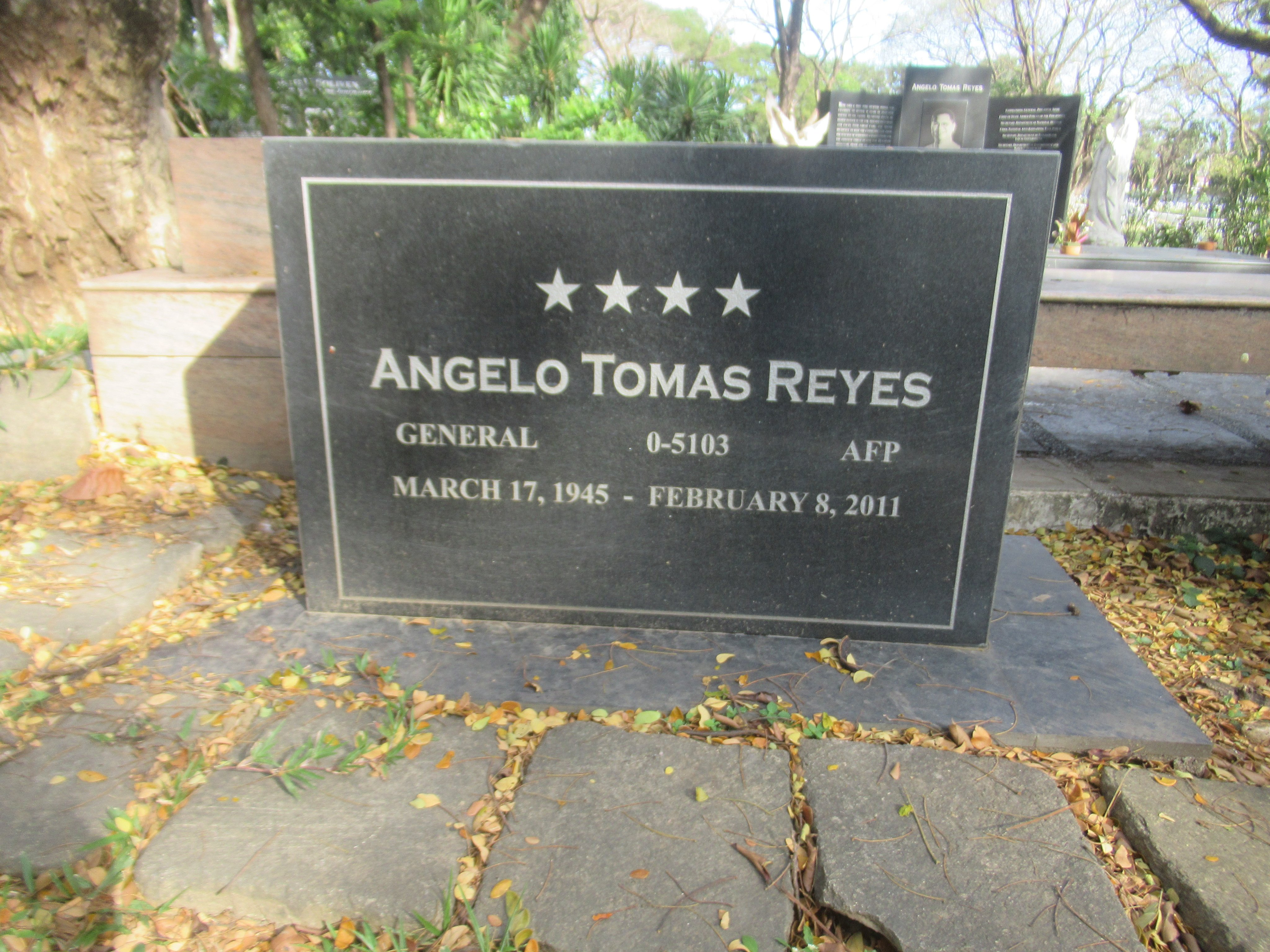
Reyes's grave at the Libingan ng mga Bayani

On January 27, 2011, retired Lt. Col. George Rabusa, who served as AFP's budget officer during Reyes' tenure as Armed Forces chief, testified before a Senate panel and accused Reyes of receiving ₱50 million in "send-off" money when he retired from the Armed Forces, as part of a decades-old military tradition. Reyes denied receiving such funds for his own use and sought to cross-examine Rabusa, but was refused the opportunity. Reyes then did not attend subsequent hearings in both the Senate and the House of Representatives.

On the morning of February 8, 2011, a month before his 66th birthday, Reyes, together with two of his sons and a bodyguard, visited his parents' grave at the Loyola Memorial Park in Marikina. He asked his children and bodyguard to go ahead and wait for him in the car, before shooting himself in the chest near the heart. He was rushed to Quirino Memorial Medical Center in Quezon City, but was declared dead on arrival and attempts to revive him were unsuccessful. The cause of his suicide ranges from pressure from the media and the senators taking the questions to a personal level and his connection to the Arroyo administration, with then-Senator Antonio Trillanes IV calling him "gutless coward". A visitor to the cemetery and caretaker were present nearby and witnessed the suicide; the latter was stated to have overheard Reyes's last words "I'm sorry".

On February 11, 2011, Reyes's remains were transferred to the Saint Ignatius Cathedral at Camp Aguinaldo, Quezon City, for a funeral. Reyes was buried on February 13, 2011, with full military honors at the Libingan ng mga Bayani in Taguig, Metro Manila.

== Awards ==
- Presidential Medal of Merit (Philippines)
- Disaster Relief & Rehabilitation Operation Ribbon
- Anti-dissidence Campaign Medal
- Luzon Anti Dissidence Campaign Medal
- Visayas Anti-Dissidence Campaign Medal
- Mindanao Anti-dissidence Campaign Medal
- Long Service Medal
- Military Commendation Medal
- Military Civic Action Medal
- Silver Wing Medal
- Distinguished Service Star
