= List of political appointments by Rodrigo Duterte =

Duterte Cabinet
- Cabinet of the Philippines
- 2016–2022
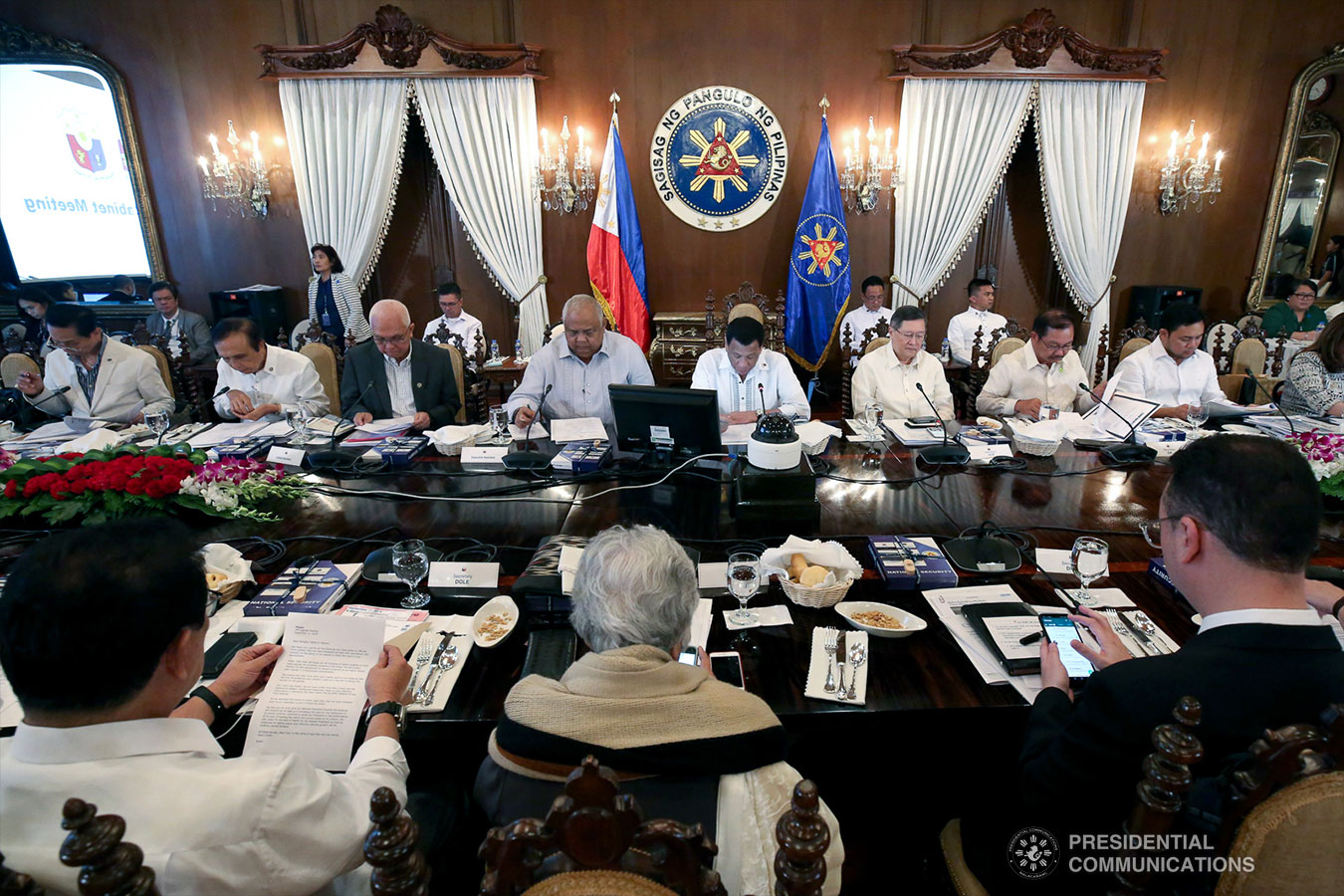
- Duterte presides over the 29th Cabinet Meeting at the Malacañang Palace on September 11, 2018
- Date formed: June 30, 2016
- Date dissolved: June 30, 2022

People and organisations
- President: Rodrigo Duterte
- President's history: 2016–2022
- Vice-president: Leni Robredo
- Member party: PDP-Laban; People's Reform Party; Nacionalista Party; National Unity Party; Lakas–CMD; Nationalist People's Coalition; Partido Federal ng Pilipinas; Laban ng Demokratikong Pilipino; Pederalismo ng Dugong Dakilang Samahan; Hugpong ng Pagbabago; Pwersa ng Masang Pilipino; Makabayan (Until 2017)
- Opposition party: Liberal Party; Akbayan; Katipunan ng Nagkakaisang Pilipino; Makabayan (From 2017)
- Opposition leader: Leni Robredo

History
- Election: 2016 Philippine presidential election
- Legislature terms: 17th Congress of the Philippines; 18th Congress of the Philippines
- Budgets: General Appropriations Act of 2017; General Appropriations Act of 2018; General Appropriations Act of 2019; Extension of General Appropriations Act of 2019; General Appropriations Act of 2020; General Appropriations Act of 2021; General Appropriations Act of 2022
- Advice and consent: Senate of the Philippines
- Predecessor: Cabinet of Benigno Aquino III
- Successor: Cabinet of Bongbong Marcos

Rodrigo Duterte assumed office as President of the Philippines on June 30, 2016, and his term ended on June 30, 2022. On May 31, 2016, a few weeks before his presidential inauguration, Duterte named his Cabinet members, which comprised a diverse selection of former military generals, childhood friends, classmates, and leftists. Following his presidential inauguration, he administered a mass oath-taking for his Cabinet officials, and held his first Cabinet meeting on June 30.

During his tenure, he appointed several retired military generals and police directors to the Cabinet and other government agencies, stressing they are honest and competent. He initially offered four executive departments to left-leaning individuals, who later resigned, were fired, or rejected by the Commission on Appointments after relations between the government and the communist rebels deteriorated. He fired several Cabinet members and officials linked to corruption, but has been accused by critics of "recycling" people he fired when he reappointed some of them to other government positions. Admitting he is not an economist, he appointed several technocrats in his Cabinet, which he relied upon on economic affairs. In February 2022, a few months before leaving office, he said he got the "best minds" in his Cabinet, whom he praised for their good works, and expressed his willingness to pass his Cabinet members to the succeeding administration for the benefit of the people.

== Administration and cabinet ==
Office	Name	Term
President	Rodrigo Roa Duterte	June 30, 2016 – June 30, 2022
Head of state	Rodrigo Roa Duterte	June 30, 2016 – June 30, 2022
Head of government	Rodrigo Roa Duterte	June 30, 2016 – June 30, 2022
Vice-President	Maria Leonor G. Robredo	June 30, 2016 – June 30, 2022
Executive secretary	Atty. Salvador Medialdea	June 30, 2016 – June 30, 2022
Chief presidential Legal Counsel	Atty. Salvador Panelo	June 30, 2016 – October 8, 2021
Chief presidential Legal Counsel	Atty. Jesus Melchor Quitain	October 19, 2021 – June 30, 2022
Cabinet Secretary	Leoncio Evasco Jr.	June 30, 2016 – October 16, 2018
Cabinet Secretary	Karlo Nograles	November 5, 2018 – March 7, 2022
Cabinet Secretary	Melvin Matibag (Acting)	March 8, 2022 – June 30, 2022
Secretary of Agrarian Reform	Rafael V. Mariano	June 30, 2016 – September 6, 2017
Secretary of Agrarian Reform	Rosalina Bistoyong (OIC)	September 11, 2017 – November 30, 2017
Secretary of Agrarian Reform	John Castriciones	December 1, 2017 (Acting) / March 22, 2018 – October 14, 2021
Secretary of Agrarian Reform	Bernie Cruz (Acting)	October 28, 2021 – June 22, 2022
Secretary of Agrarian Reform	David Erro (OIC)	June 22, 2022 – June 30, 2022
Secretary of Agriculture	Manny Piñol	June 30, 2016 – June 27, 2019
Secretary of Agriculture	William Dar	August 5, 2019 – June 30, 2022
Secretary of Budget and Management	Benjamin Diokno	June 30, 2016 – March 4, 2019
Secretary of Budget and Management	Janet Abuel (OIC)	March 5, 2019 – August 5, 2019
Secretary of Budget and Management	Wendel Avisado	August 5, 2019 – August 13, 2021
Secretary of Budget and Management	Tina Rose Marie Canda (OIC)	August 13, 2021 – June 30, 2022
Secretary of Education	Prof. Leonor Magtolis Briones	June 30, 2016 – June 30, 2022
Secretary of Energy	Alfonso Cusi	June 30, 2016 – June 30, 2022
Secretary of Environment and Natural Resources	Gina López	June 30, 2016 – May 3, 2017
Secretary of Environment and Natural Resources	Ret. Gen. Roy Cimatu, AFP	May 8, 2017 – February 18, 2022
Secretary of Environment and Natural Resources	Jim Sampluna, CESO I (Acting)	February 18, 2022 – June 22, 2022
Secretary of Environment and Natural Resources	Joselin Marcus Fragada (OIC)	June 22, 2022 – June 30, 2022
Secretary of Finance	Carlos Dominguez III	June 30, 2016 – June 30, 2022
Secretary of Foreign Affairs	Perfecto Yasay Jr.	June 30, 2016 – March 8, 2017
Secretary of Foreign Affairs	Enrique Manalo (Acting)	March 9, 2017 – May 17, 2017
Secretary of Foreign Affairs	Alan Peter Cayetano	May 18, 2017 – October 17, 2018
Secretary of Foreign Affairs	Teodoro Locsin, Jr.	October 17, 2018 – June 30, 2022
Secretary of Health	Paulyn Jean Rosell-Ubial, M.D.	June 30, 2016 – October 10, 2017
Secretary of Health	Herminigildo V. Valle (OIC)	October 12, 2017 – October 25, 2017
Secretary of Health	Francisco Duque III	October 26, 2017 – June 30, 2022
Secretary of Human Settlements and Urban Development	Ret. Maj. Gen. Eduardo del Rosario, AFP	January 7, 2020 – June 30, 2022
Secretary of Information and Communications Technology	Rodolfo Salalima	June 30, 2016 – September 22, 2017
Secretary of Information and Communications Technology	Ret. BGen. Eliseo M. Rio, Jr., AFP	October 12, 2017 – June 30, 2019
Secretary of Information and Communications Technology	Ret. Col. Gregorio Honasan, PA	July 1, 2019 – October 8, 2021
Secretary of Information and Communications Technology	Jose Arturo De Castro (OIC)	October 28, 2021 – December 19, 2021
Secretary of Information and Communications Technology	Emmanuel Rey Caintic (Acting)	December 20, 2021 – June 30, 2022
Secretary of the Interior and Local Government	Ismael Sueno	June 30, 2016 – April 4, 2017
Secretary of the Interior and Local Government	Ret. Police Maj. Gen. Catalino Cuy (OIC)	April 5, 2017 – January 5, 2018
Secretary of the Interior and Local Government	Ret. Gen. Eduardo Año, AFP	January 5, 2018 (OIC) / November 5, 2018 – June 30, 2022
Secretary of Justice	Vitaliano Aguirre II	June 30, 2016 – April 5, 2018
Secretary of Justice	Menardo I. Guevarra	April 5, 2018 – June 30, 2022
Secretary of Labor and Employment	Silvestre Bello III	June 30, 2016 – June 30, 2022
Secretary of Migrant Workers	Abdullah Derupong Mama-o (Ad-Interim)	March 9, 2022 – June 30, 2022
Secretary of National Defense	Ret. Maj. Gen. Delfin Lorenzana, AFP	June 30, 2016 – June 30, 2022
Secretary of Public Works and Highways	Rafael Yabut (Acting)	July 1, 2016 – July 26/27, 2016
Secretary of Public Works and Highways	Mark Villar	June 30, 2016 – October 4, 2021
Secretary of Public Works and Highways	Roger Mercado (OIC)	October 13, 2021 – June 30, 2022
Secretary of Science and Technology	Fortunato de la Peña	June 30, 2016 – June 30, 2022
Secretary of Social Welfare and Development	Prof. Judy Taguiwalo	June 30, 2016 – August 16, 2017
Secretary of Social Welfare and Development	Emmanuel A. Leyco (OIC)	August 19, 2017 – May 9, 2018
Secretary of Social Welfare and Development	Virginia Orogo (OIC)	May 10, 2018 – October 15, 2018
Secretary of Social Welfare and Development	Ret. Lt. Gen. Rolando Joselito Bautista, AFP	October 17, 2018 – June 30, 2022
Secretary of Tourism	Wanda Corazon Teo	June 30, 2016 – May 8, 2018
Secretary of Tourism	Bernadette Romulo-Puyat	May 8, 2018 – June 30, 2022
Secretary of Trade and Industry	Ramon Lopez	June 30, 2016 – June 30, 2022
Secretary of Transportation	Atty. Arthur Tugade	June 30, 2016 – June 30, 2022
Presidential Spokesperson	Sec. Ernesto Abella	June 30, 2016 – October 27, 2017
Presidential Spokesperson	Sec. Harry Roque	October 29, 2017 – October 15, 2018
Presidential Spokesperson	Sec. Salvador Panelo	October 15, 2018 – April 12, 2020
Presidential Spokesperson	Sec. Harry Roque	April 13, 2020 – November 15, 2021
Presidential Spokesperson	Sec. Karlo Nograles (Acting)	November 15, 2021 – March 7, 2022
Presidential Spokesperson	Sec. Martin Andanar (Acting)	March 8, 2022 – June 30, 2022
Secretary of the Presidential Communications Operations Office	Martin Andanar	June 30, 2016 – June 30, 2022
Director-General of the National Economic and Development Authority	Ernesto Pernia	June 30, 2016 – April 17, 2020
Director-General of the National Economic and Development Authority	Karl Kendrick Chua	April 17, 2020 (Acting) / April 22, 2021 –
National Security Adviser	Ret. Gen. Hermogenes Esperon, AFP	June 30, 2016 –
Presidential Adviser on the Peace Process	Jesus Dureza	June 30, 2016 – November 27, 2018
Presidential Adviser on the Peace Process	Ret. Gen. Carlito Galvez Jr., AFP	December 12, 2018 –
Special assistant to the President	Christopher Lawrence "Bong" Go	June 30, 2016 – October 15, 2018
Special assistant to the President	Atty. Jesus Melchor Quitain (OIC)	November 12, 2018 – June 30, 2022
Chairperson of the Commission on Higher Education	Dr. Patricia Licuanan	June 30, 2016 – January 15, 2018
Chairperson of the Commission on Higher Education	Prof. J. Prospero de Vera III	January 24, 2018 (OIC) / October 15, 2018 – June 30, 2022
AFP Chief of Staff/Chairman of the Joint Chiefs	Gen. Ricardo Visaya	July 1, 2016 – December 7, 2016
AFP Chief of Staff/Chairman of the Joint Chiefs	Gen. Eduardo Año	December 7, 2016 – October 26, 2017
AFP Chief of Staff/Chairman of the Joint Chiefs	Gen. Rey Leonardo Guerrero	October 26, 2017 – April 18, 2018
AFP Chief of Staff/Chairman of the Joint Chiefs	Gen. Carlito Galvez Jr.	April 18, 2018 – December 12, 2018
AFP Chief of Staff/Chairman of the Joint Chiefs	Gen. Benjamin Madrigal Jr.	December 12, 2018 – September 28, 2019
AFP Chief of Staff/Chairman of the Joint Chiefs	Gen. Noel Clement	September 28, 2019 – January 5, 2020
AFP Chief of Staff/Chairman of the Joint Chiefs	Gen. Felimon Santos Jr.	January 5, 2020 – August 3, 2020
AFP Chief of Staff/Chairman of the Joint Chiefs	Gen. Gilbert Gapay, PA	August 4, 2020 – February 4, 2021
AFP Chief of Staff/Chairman of the Joint Chiefs	Gen. Cirilito Sobejana, PA	February 4, 2021 – July 31, 2021
AFP Chief of Staff/Chairman of the Joint Chiefs	Gen. Jose Faustino Jr., PA	July 31, 2021 – November 12, 2021
AFP Chief of Staff/Chairman of the Joint Chiefs	Gen. Andres Centino, PA	November 12, 2021 – June 30, 2022
Chief of the Philippine National Police	Police Dir. Gen. Ronald dela Rosa	July 1, 2016 – April 19, 2018
Chief of the Philippine National Police	Police Gen. Oscar Albayalde	April 19, 2018 – October 14, 2019
Chief of the Philippine National Police	Police Gen. Archie Gamboa	October 14, 2019 – September 2, 2020
Chief of the Philippine National Police	Police Gen. Camilo Cascolan	September 2, 2020 – November 10, 2020
Chief of the Philippine National Police	Police Gen. Debold Sinas	November 10, 2020 – May 8, 2021
Chief of the Philippine National Police	Police Gen. Guillermo Eleazar	May 8, 2021 – November 13, 2021
Chief of the Philippine National Police	Police Gen. Dionardo Carlos	November 13, 2021 – May 8, 2022
Chief of the Philippine National Police	Police Lt. Gen. Vicente Danao (Acting)	May 8, 2022 – June 30, 2022
Solicitor General	Jose Calida	June 30, 2016 – June 30, 2022
Chairman of the Metropolitan Manila Development Authority	Emerson Carlos	July 8, 2016 – August 19, 2016
Chairman of the Metropolitan Manila Development Authority	Thomas Orbos (OIC)	August 23, 2016 – May 21, 2017
Chairman of the Metropolitan Manila Development Authority	Ret. BGen. Danilo Lim, AFP	May 22, 2017 – January 6, 2021
Chairman of the Metropolitan Manila Development Authority	Benjamin Abalos Jr.	January 11, 2021 – February 7, 2022
Chairman of the Metropolitan Manila Development Authority	Atty. Romando Artes	February 9, 2022 – June 30, 2022
Lead Convenor of the National Anti-Poverty Commission	Liza Maza	June 30, 2016 – August 20, 2018
Lead Convenor of the National Anti-Poverty Commission	Noel Felongco	November 6, 2018 – June 30, 2022
Presidential Assistant for the Visayas	Michael Dino	June 30, 2016 – June 30, 2022
Chairman of the Mindanao Development Authority	Luwalhati Antonino	June 30, 2016 – September 9, 2016
Chairman of the Mindanao Development Authority	Datu Abul Khayr Alonto	September 9, 2016 – May 9, 2019
Chairman of the Mindanao Development Authority	Nathaniel D. Dalumpines (OIC)	May 10, 2019 – July 31, 2019
Chairman of the Mindanao Development Authority	Manny Piñol	August 1, 2019 – October 5, 2021
Chairman of the Mindanao Development Authority	Maria Belen S. Acosta	January 13, 2022 – June 30, 2022
Director-General of the Technical Education and Skills Development Authority	Atty. Guiling A. Mamondiong	July 13, 2016 – October 24, 2018
Director-General of the Technical Education and Skills Development Authority	Ret. Police Lt. Gen. Isidro S. Lapeña	October 25, 2018 – June 30, 2022
Presidential Adviser on Legislative Affairs Secretary of Presidential Legislative Liaison Office	Adelino B. Sitoy	September 12, 2016 – April 15, 2021
Presidential Adviser on Legislative Affairs Secretary of Presidential Legislative Liaison Office	Luzverfeda Estepa Pascual (Acting)	June 24, 2021 – June 30, 2022
Chairperson of the Commission on Filipinos Overseas	Maria Regina G. Galias (OIC)	September 12, 2016 – August 19, 2018
Chairperson of the Commission on Filipinos Overseas	Francisco P. Acosta	August 20, 2018 – June 30, 2022
Chairperson of the National Commission on Muslim Filipinos	Yasmin Busran-Lao	July 9, 2016 – July 8, 2018
Chairperson of the National Commission on Muslim Filipinos	Atty. Saidamen Balt Pangarungan	July 9, 2018 – March 8, 2022
Chairperson of the National Commission on Muslim Filipinos	Atty. Guiling A. Mamondiong	March 8, 2022 – June 30, 2022
Chairman of the Dangerous Drugs Board	Benjamin P. Reyes	August 26, 2016 – July 8, 2017
Chairman of the Dangerous Drugs Board	Ret. Gen. Dionisio R. Santiago, AFP	July 10, 2017 – November 6, 2017
Chairman of the Dangerous Drugs Board	Ret. Police Maj. Gen. Catalino Cuy	January 5, 2018 – June 30, 2022
Administrator of the Maritime Industry Authority	Marcial Amaro III	June 30, 2016 – January 4, 2018
Administrator of the Maritime Industry Authority	Ret. Gen. Rey Leonardo Guerrero, AFP	April 18, 2018 – October 24, 2018
Administrator of the Maritime Industry Authority	Ret. VAdm. Narciso A. Vingson Jr., AFP (OIC)	October 24, 2018 – March 1, 2020
Administrator of the Maritime Industry Authority	Ret. VAdm. Robert Empedrad, PN	March 2, 2020 – June 30, 2022
Commissioner of Bureau of Customs	Ret. Capt. Nicanor Faeldon, PMC	June 30, 2016 – August 21, 2017
Commissioner of Bureau of Customs	Ret. Police Lt. Gen. Isidro S. Lapeña	August 22, 2017 – October 24, 2018
Commissioner of Bureau of Customs	Ret. Gen. Rey Leonardo Guerrero, AFP	October 25, 2018 – June 30, 2022
Chief of Bureau of Immigration	Ret. Police Maj. Gen. Jaime Morente	June 30, 2016 – June 30, 2022
Commissioner of Bureau of Internal Revenue	Cesar Dulay	June 30, 2016 – June 30, 2022
Chief of the Land Transportation Franchising and Regulatory Board	Atty. Martin Delgra III	June 30, 2016 – June 30, 2022
Chief of the Land Transportation Office	Ret. Police Maj. Gen. Edgar C. Galvante	June 30, 2016 – June 30, 2022
Director-General of the National Intelligence Coordinating Agency	Alex Paul Monteagudo	June 30, 2016 – June 30, 2022
Chief of the National Bureau of Investigation	Atty. Dante Gierran, CPA, LLB	June 30, 2016 – February 21, 2020
Chief of the National Bureau of Investigation	Eric Bito-on Distor (OIC)	February 22, 2020 – June 30, 2022
Executive director of the National Disaster Risk Reduction and Management Council	Ret. BGen. Ricardo Jalad PA	June 30, 2016 – June 30, 2022
Chief of the National Telecommunications Commission	Gamaliel Cordoba	June 30, 2016 – June 30, 2022
Chairperson of the Philippine Amusement and Gaming Corporation	Andrea Domingo	June 30, 2016 – June 30, 2022
Chief of the Philippine Drug Enforcement Agency	Ret. Police Lt. Gen. Isidro S. Lapeña	June 30, 2016 – September 5, 2017
Chief of the Philippine Drug Enforcement Agency	Ret. Police BGen. Aaron Aquino	September 6, 2017 – May 25, 2020
Chief of the Philippine Drug Enforcement Agency	Wilkins M. Villanueva, MPA, CESE	May 26, 2020 – June 30, 2022
Administrator of the National Irrigation Administration	Peter T. Laviña	November 15, 2016 – March 1, 2017
Administrator of the National Irrigation Administration	Ret. Gen. Ricardo Visaya, AFP	March 7, 2017 – June 30, 2022
Administrator of the Philippine Coconut Authority	Avelino Andal	June 30, 2016 – March 15, 2017
Administrator of the Philippine Coconut Authority	Romulo "Billy" Dela Rosa	July 3, 2017 – January 26, 2020
Administrator of the Philippine Coconut Authority	Ret. Gen. Benjamin Madrigal Jr., AFP	January 27, 2020 – June 30, 2022
Administrator of the National Food Authority	Tomas Escarez (OIC)	June 30, 2016 – December 28, 2016
Administrator of the National Food Authority	Ret. Maj. Jason Aquino, PA	December 29, 2016 – September 11, 2018
Administrator of the National Food Authority	Judy Carol L. Dansal (OIC)	September 12, 2018 – June 30, 2022
Director of the Bureau of Corrections	Ret. Supt. Rolando Asuncion (OIC)	June 30, 2016 – January 6, 2017
Director of the Bureau of Corrections	Ret. Supt. Benjamin delos Santos	January 6, 2017 – July 13, 2017
Director of the Bureau of Corrections	Ret. Police BGen. Valfrie Tabian (OIC)	July 16, 2017 – April 18, 2018
Director of the Bureau of Corrections	Ret. Police Gen. Ronald dela Rosa	April 20, 2018 – October 12, 2018
Director of the Bureau of Corrections	Ret. Capt. Nicanor Faeldon, PMC	October 12, 2018 – September 4, 2019
Director of the Bureau of Corrections	Ret. Police BGen. Melvin Ramon G. Buenafe (OIC)	September 6, 2019 – September 16, 2019
Director of the Bureau of Corrections	Gerald Bantag	September 17, 2019 – June 30, 2022
Director-General of Philippine Space Agency	Joel Marciano Jr.	January 7, 2020 – June 30, 2022
Chairperson of the Presidential Anti-Corruption Commission	Dante Jimenez	January 12, 2018 – January 29, 2021
Chairperson of the Presidential Anti-Corruption Commission	Greco Belgica	March 24, 2021 – October 8, 2021
Chairperson of the Presidential Anti-Corruption Commission	Atty. Fortunato G. Guerrero	October 11, 2021 – June 30, 2022

== Changes ==
=== 2016 ===
Name	Position	Agency/Department	Date	Replaced by
Manuel Huberto Gaite	Commissioner	Securities and Exchange Commission	December 2, 2016	Emilio Aquino
Leni Robredo	Chairperson	Housing and Urban Development Coordinating Council	December 5, 2016	Leoncio Evasco Jr. Eduardo Del Rosario
Al Argosino	Deputy Commissioners	Bureau of Immigration	December 16, 2016	Estanislao Canta (OIC); Tobias Javier
Michael Robles	Deputy Commissioners	Bureau of Immigration	December 16, 2016	Jose Carlitos Licas (OIC); Aimee Torrefranca-Neri (Note: As Undersecretary of Department of Justice and Department of Social Welfare and Development and as Commissioner of COMELEC)

=== 2017 ===
Name	Position	Agency/Department	Date	Replaced by
Rolando Asuncion	Director	Bureau of Corrections	January 6, 2017	Benjamin Delos Santos
Peter T. Laviña	Administrator	National Irrigation Administration	March 1, 2017	Ret. Gen. Ricardo Visaya
Perfecto Yasay Jr.	Secretary	Department of Foreign Affairs	March 8, 2017	Enrique Manalo (Acting); Alan Peter Cayetano
Avelino Andal (Note: As Board Member of Movie and Television Review and Classification Board.)	Administrator	Philippine Coconut Authority	March 15, 2017	Romulo Dela Rosa
Ismael Sueno	Secretary	Department of the Interior and Local Government	April 4, 2017	Catalino Cuy; Ret. Gen. Eduardo Año
Gina Lopez	Secretary	Department of Environment and Natural Resources	May 3, 2017	Ret. Gen. Roy Cimatu
Cherie Mercado	Spokesperson	Department of Transportation	May 19, 2017	Atty. Leah Quimabao
Benjamin P. Reyes	Chairman	Dangerous Drugs Board	May 24, 2017	Ret. Gen. Dionisio R. Santiago
Benjamin Delos Santos	Director	Bureau of Corrections	July 13, 2017	Rey Raagas (OIC); Ret. Dir. Gen. Ronald dela Rosa
Judy Taguiwalo	Secretary	Department of Social Welfare and Development	August 16, 2017	Emmanuel A. Leyco (OIC); Virginia Orogo (Acting); Ret. Lt. Gen. Rolando Joselito Bautista
Ret. Capt. Nicanor Faeldon (Note: As Deputy Administrator of the Office of the Civil Defense, later as Director-General of the Bureau of Corrections, Later, he was sacked from office on September 4, 2019.)	Commissioner	Bureau of Customs	August 21, 2017	Ret. Supt. Isidro Lapeña (Note: As Commissioner of the Bureau of Customs, later he was designated as Director-General of TESDA.)
Rafael V. Mariano	Secretary	Department of Agrarian Reform	September 6, 2017	Rosalina Bistoyong (OIC); John Castriciones
Rodolfo Salalima	Secretary	Department of Information and Communications Technology	September 22, 2017	Ret. BGen. Eliseo M. Rio, Jr.
Martin Diño (Note: As Interior Undersecretary.)	Chairperson	Subic Bay Metropolitan Authority	September 27, 2017	Wilma Eisma
Jose Vicente Salazar	Chairperson	Energy Regulatory Commission	October 9, 2017	Agnes Devanadera
Paulyn Jean Rosell-Ubial	Secretary	Department of Health	October 10, 2017	Herminigildo V. Valle (OIC); Francisco Duque
Gertrudo de Leon	Undersecretary	Department of Budget and Management	October 20, 2017	Herman B. Jumilla
Ernesto Abella (Note: As Foreign Affairs Undersecretary.)	Presidential Spokesman	Presidential Communications Group	October 27, 2017	Harry Roque
Isko Moreno (Note: As Social Welfare Undersecretary, later resigned on October 11, 2018.)	Chairman	North Luzon Railways Corporation	October 27, 2017	
Ret. Gen. Dionisio Santiago	Chairman	Dangerous Drugs Board	November 6, 2017	Catalino Cuy
Cesar Chavez	Undersecretary	Department of Transportation	November 23, 2017	Timothy James Batan
Terry Ridon	Chairman	Presidential Commission for the Urban Poor	December 11, 2017	Noel Felongco (Note: As Lead Convenor of the National Anti-Poverty Commission)
Melissa A. Aradanas (Note: As Housing and Urban Development Coordinating Council Deputy Director General.)	Commissioners	Presidential Commission for the Urban Poor	December 11, 2017	Romeo Halasan Janduga
Manuel Serra Jr. (Note: As Member of Philippine Coconut Authority Governing Board)	Commissioners	Presidential Commission for the Urban Poor	December 11, 2017	Randy Halasan
Joan Lagunda (Note: As Assistant Secretary of DENR.)	Commissioners	Presidential Commission for the Urban Poor	December 11, 2017	Norman Brillantes Baloro
Noel Indonto	Commissioners	Presidential Commission for the Urban Poor	December 11, 2017	Melvin Mitra
Atty. Elba Cruz	President	Development Academy of the Philippines	December 21, 2017	Magdalena Mendoza (OIC); Engelbert Caronan Jr.

=== 2018 ===
Name	Position	Agency/Department	Date	Replaced by
Marcial Amaro III	Administrator	Maritime Industry Authority	January 4, 2018	Ret. Gen. Rey Leonardo Guerrero (Note: As Commissioner of the Bureau of Customs)
Jose Jorge E. Corpuz	Chairman	Philippine Charity Sweepstakes Office	January 12, 2018	Ret. Gen. Anselmo Pinili
Patricia Licuanan	Chairperson	Commission on Higher Education	January 15, 2018	J. Prospero de Vera III
Amado Valdez	Chairman	Social Security System	February 12, 2018	Aurora Cruz-Ignacio
Jose Gabriel La Viña (Note: As Tourism Undersecretary, later as Agriculture Undersecretary, now resigned on October 17, 2018.)	Commissioner	Social Security System	February 12, 2018	Ricardo Moldez
Allen Capuyan (Note: As Chairperson of the National Commission on Indigenous Peoples)	Assistant general manager	Manila International Airport Authority	March 14, 2018	Elenita M. Fernando
Vitaliano Aguirre II	Secretary	Department of Justice	April 5, 2018	Menardo Guevarra
Aiza Seguerra	Chairperson	National Youth Commission	April 5, 2018	Ronald Gian Cardema
Dominador Say	Undersecretary	Department of Labor and Employment	April 17, 2018	Renato Ebarle
Ronald dela Rosa	Chief	Philippine National Police	April 18, 2018	Oscar Albayalde
Atty. Karen Jimeno (Note: As Undersecretary for Disaster Resiliency of the Presidential Management Staff, later resigned.)	Undersecretary for Legal Affairs and Priority Projects	Department of Public Works and Highways	April 22, 2018	
Blas James Viterbo	Commissioner	Securities and Exchange Commission	April 24, 2018	Javey Paul Francisco
Atty. Aimee Torrecampo-Neri	Deputy Commissioner	Bureau of Immigration	May 2, 2018	Marc Red Mariñas (OIC)
Roberto Teo	Board Member	Tourism Infrastructure and Enterprise Zone Authority	May 7, 2018	
Wanda Corazon Teo	Secretary	Department of Tourism	May 8, 2018	Bernadette Romulo-Puyat
Tingagun Umpa	Assistant secretary	Department of Public Works and Highways	May 15, 2018	
Moslemen T. Macarambon Sr.	Assistant secretary	Department of Justice	May 15, 2018	
Frederick Alegre	Assistant secretary	Department of Tourism	May 15, 2018	Myra Abubakar
Cesar Montano	Head	Tourism Promotions Board	May 21, 2018	Arnold Gonzales (OIC); Maria Venus Tan
Mark Tolentino	Assistant secretary	Department of Transportation	May 22, 2018	
Rudolf Jurado	Chief	Office of the Government Corporate Counsel	May 28, 2018	Elpidio Vega
Noel Patrick Prudente	Deputy Commissioner	Bureau of Customs	May 30, 2018	Jeffrey Ian C. Dy
Celestina dela Serna	Officer-in-Charge	Philippine Health Insurance Corporation	June 5, 2018	Roy Ferrer
Teresita Herbosa	Chairperson	Securities and Exchange Commission	June 6, 2018	Emilio Aquino
Patricia Yvette Ocampo	Chairperson	Nayong Pilipino Foundation	August 7, 2018	Lucille Karen E. Malilong
Petronilo L. Ilagan	Undersecretary	Department of Energy	August 15, 2018	
Liza Maza	Lead Convenor	National Anti-Poverty Commission	August 20, 2018	Noel Felongco
Katherine de Castro (Note: As Board Member of IBC-13)	Undersecretary of Tourism Advocacy and Public Affairs	Department of Tourism	August 22, 2018	Edwin Enrile
Ret. Maj. Jason Aquino	Administrator	National Food Authority	September 11, 2018	Judy Carol L. Dansal (OIC)
Mocha Uson (Note: As Deputy Executive Director of Overseas Workers Welfare Administration)	Assistant secretary	Presidential Communications Operations Office	October 1, 2018	
Joel Maglunsod	Undersecretary	Department of Labor and Employment	October 2, 2018	Ana Colting Dione
Ret. Dir. Gen. Ronald dela Rosa	Director-General	Bureau of Corrections	October 12, 2018	Ret. Capt. Nicanor Faeldon
Alan Peter Cayetano	Secretary	Department of Foreign Affairs	October 12, 2018	Teodoro Locsin, Jr.
Marc Red Mariñas	Deputy Commissioner	Bureau of Immigration	October 12, 2018	Atty. Jose Ronaldo P. Ledesma (OIC)
Harry Roque	Presidential Spokesman	Presidential Communications Group	October 15, 2018	Salvador Panelo
Christopher "Bong" Go	Special assistant to the President	Presidential Management Staff	October 15, 2018	Jesus Melchor Quitain (OIC)
Leoncio Evasco Jr.	Cabinet Secretary	Office of the Cabinet Secretary	October 16, 2018	Karlo Nograles
Francis Tolentino	Political Adviser	Office of Political Adviser	October 17, 2018	
Thomas Orbos	Undersecretary	Department of Transportation	October 17, 2018	
Guiling A. Mamondiong	Director-General	Technical Education and Skills Development Authority	October 17, 2018	Ret. Supt. Isidro S. Lapeña
Maria Lourdes Turalde-Jarabe	Undersecretary for Promotive Operations and Programs	Department of Social Welfare and Development	November 18, 2018	
Mae Ancheta-Templa	Undersecretary for Protective Operations and Programs	Department of Social Welfare and Development	November 18, 2018	
Hope Hervilla	Undersecretary for Disaster Response Management	Department of Social Welfare and Development	November 18, 2018	
Falconi Millar	Secretary-General	Housing and Urban Development Coordinating Council	November 19, 2018	Marcelino Escalada Jr.
Jesus Dureza	Presidential Adviser	Office of the Presidential Adviser on the Peace Process	November 27, 2018	Gen. Carlito Galvez Jr.
Ronald Flores	Undersecretary	Office of the Presidential Adviser on the Peace Process	November 27, 2018	
Yeshtern Donn Baccay	Assistant secretary	Office of the Presidential Adviser on the Peace Process	November 27, 2018	
Stella Quimbo	Commissioner	Philippine Competition Commission	November 28, 2018	

=== 2019 ===
Name	Position	Agency/Department	Date	Replaced by
Arnell Ignacio	Deputy Administrator	Overseas Workers Welfare Administration	February 26, 2019	Mocha Uson
Benjamin Diokno (Note: As Governor of Bangko Sentral ng Pilipinas)	Secretary	Department of Budget and Management	March 4, 2019	Janet Abuel (OIC)
Alexander Balutan	General manager	Philippine Charity Sweepstakes Office	March 8, 2019	Royina Garma
Emmanuel F. Dooc	President and CEO	Social Security System	March 28, 2019	Aurora Cruz-Ignacio
Nela Charade Puno	Director General	Food and Drug Administration	May 16, 2019	Enrique Domingo
Ronald Gian Cardema	Chairperson	National Youth Commission	May 19, 2019	Paul Anthony Pangilinan
Reynaldo Velasco	Administrator	Metropolitan Waterworks and Sewerage System	May 24, 2019	Emmanuel B. Salamat
Roy Ferrer	Officer-in-Charge	Philippine Health Insurance Corporation	June 13, 2019	Ret. Gen. Ricardo Morales
Jack Arroyo	Local Chief Executive	Philippine Health Insurance Corporation	June 13, 2019	
Rex Maria Mendoza	Independent Director of the Monetary Board	Philippine Health Insurance Corporation	June 13, 2019	
Hildegardes Dineros	Member, Information Economy sector	Philippine Health Insurance Corporation	June 13, 2019	
Celestina Ma. Jude dela Serna	Member, Filipino Overseas Workers sector	Philippine Health Insurance Corporation	June 13, 2019	
Roberto Salvador	Member, Formal Economy sector	Philippine Health Insurance Corporation	June 13, 2019	
Joan Cristine Reina Liban-Lareza	Member, Health Care Provider sector	Philippine Health Insurance Corporation	June 13, 2019	
Ret. BGen. Eliseo M. Rio, Jr.	Secretary	Department of Information and Communications Technology	June 30, 2019	Gregorio Honasan
Jesus Clint O. Aranas	President and General Manager	Government Service Insurance System	July 2, 2019	Lucas Bersamin
Manny Piñol (Note: As Chairman of Mindanao Development Authority)	Secretary	Department of Agriculture	August 5, 2019	William Dar
Janet Abuel (OIC)	Secretary	Department of Budget and Management	August 5, 2019	Wendel Avisado
	Undersecretary	Department of Budget and Management	August 20, 2019	Lloyd Christopher Lao
	Undersecretary	Department of Agriculture	August 20, 2019	Ernesto Gonzales
	Assistant secretary	Office of the Cabinet Secretary	August 20, 2019	Ricky dela Torre
	Commissioner	Securities and Exchange Commission	August 20, 2019	Karlo Bello
Ret. Capt. Nicanor Faeldon	Director-General	Bureau of Corrections	September 4, 2019	Melvin Ramon G. Buenafe (OIC); Gerald Bantag
Jose Antonio Goitia	Executive director	Pasig River Rehabilitation Commission	September 10, 2019	Anshari C. Lomodag Jr.
Pedro Aquino Jr.	President and CEO	Philippine National Oil Company	October 15, 2019	Lt. Gen. Rozzano Briguez

=== 2020 ===
Name	Position	Agency/Department	Date	Replaced by
Oscar Albayalde	Chief	Philippine National Police	January 17, 2020	Archie Gamboa
Romulo Dela Rosa	Administrator	Philippine Coconut Authority	January 26, 2020	Benjamin Madrigal Jr.
Ret. BGen. Eliseo M. Rio, Jr.	Undersecretary for Operations	Department of Information and Communications Technology	February 3, 2020	Ramon Jacinto
Dante Gierran	Chief	National Bureau of Investigation	February 21, 2020	Eric Bito-on Distor (OIC)
Ret. VAdm. Narciso A. Vingson Jr. (OIC)	Administrator	Maritime Industry Authority	March 1, 2020	Ret. VAdm. Robert Empedrad
Salvador Panelo	Presidential Spokesperson	Presidential Communications Group	April 13, 2020	Harry Roque
Ernesto Pernia	Director-General	National Economic and Development Authority	April 16, 2020	Karl Kendrick Chua (acting)
Kristoffer James Purisima	Deputy Administrator	Office of Civil Defense	May 22, 2020	
Ret. Gen. Aaron Aquino	Chief	Philippine Drug Enforcement Agency	May 25, 2020	Wilkins M. Villanueva
Ret. Gen. Ricardo Morales	President	Philippine Health Insurance Corporation	August 31, 2020	Dante Gierran
Archie Gamboa	Chief	Philippine National Police	September 1, 2020	Camilo Cascolan
Camilo Cascolan	Chief	Philippine National Police	November 10, 2020	Debold Sinas

=== 2021 ===
Name	Position	Agency/Department	Date	Replaced by
Debold Sinas	Chief	Philippine National Police	May 5, 2021	Guillermo Eleazar
Edgardo Masongsong	Administrator	National Electrification Administration	August 21, 2021	Emmanuel P. Juaneza
Wendel Avisado	Secretary	Department of Budget and Management	August 13, 2021	Tina Rose Marie Canda (OIC)
	Deputy Director-general	National Security Council	September 9, 2021	Antonio Parlade Jr.
Celine Pialago	Spokesperson	Metropolitan Manila Development Authority	October 1, 2021	
Maria Rachel Arenas	Chairperson	Movie and Television Review and Classification Board	October 1, 2021	Atty. Jeremiah P. Jaro
Ito Ynares	Presidential Adviser for Southern Tagalog		October 1, 2021	
Jojo Garcia	General manager	Metropolitan Manila Development Authority	October 4, 2021	Atty. Romando Artes
Manny Piñol	Chairman	Mindanao Development Authority	October 5, 2021	Maria Belen Acosta
Mitzi Cajayon	Undersecretary/Executive Director	Department of Social Welfare and Development/Council for Welfare of Children	October 5, 2021	
Mark Villar	Secretary	Department of Public Works and Highways	October 6, 2021	Roger Mercado (Acting)
Ernesto Abella	Undersecretary for Strategic Communications and Research	Department of Foreign Affairs	October 8, 2021	
John Castriciones	Secretary	Department of Agrarian Reform	October 8, 2021	Bernie Cruz (OIC)
Gregorio Honasan	Secretary	Department of Information and Communications Technology	October 8, 2021	Jose Arturo De Castro (OIC); Emmanuel Rey R. Caintic (Acting)
Greco Belgica	Chairperson	Presidential Anti-Corruption Commission	October 8, 2021	Atty. Fortunato G. Guerrero
Salvador Panelo	Chief presidential Legal Counsel		October 8, 2021	Jesus Melchor Quitain
Vince Dizon	Chairman and CEO	Bases Conversion and Development Authority	October 15, 2021	Aristotle Batuhan (OIC)
Guillermo Eleazar	Chief	Philippine National Police	November 10, 2021	Dionardo Carlos
Harry Roque	Presidential Spokesman	Presidential Communications Group	November 15, 2021	Karlo Nograles (acting)

=== 2022 ===
Name	Position	Agency/Department	Date	Replaced by
Eric Domingo	Director General	Food and Drug Administration	January 3, 2022	Oscar Gutierrez (OIC)
Ret. Gen. Roy Cimatu	Secretary	Department of Environment and Natural Resources	February 18, 2022	Jim Sampluna (Acting)
Goddess Libiran	Assistant secretary	Department of Transportation	February 28, 2022	
Wilma Eisma	Chairperson	Subic Bay Metropolitan Authority	March 2, 2022	Rolen Paulino
Alicia dela Rosa-Bala	Chairperson	Civil Service Commission	March 7, 2022	Karlo Nograles
Karlo Nograles (acting) (Note: As Chairman of Civil Service Commission)	Presidential Spokesman	Presidential Communications Group	March 8, 2022	Martin Andanar (acting)
Karlo Nograles (acting)	Cabinet Secretary	Office of the Cabinet Secretary	March 8, 2022	Melvin Matibag
Abdullah Derupong Mama-o	Secretary	Department of Migrant Workers	March 9, 2022	
Aurora Cruz-Ignacio	President and CEO	Social Security System	March 11, 2022	Michael Regino
Ephyro Luis Amatong	Commissioner	Securities and Exchange Commission	March 21, 2022	McJill Bryant Fernandez
	Undersecretary	Department of Health	March 24, 2022	Elmer Punzalan
