= Drug policy of the Philippines =

The drug policy of the Philippines is guided by the Comprehensive Dangerous Drugs Act of 2002 and is implemented by the Dangerous Drugs Board with its implementing arm, the Philippine Drug Enforcement Agency along with other member agencies. Aside from regulating and prohibiting the usage, sale, production of certain drugs, the 2002 law is noted for including policies on drug testing.

== History ==
=== 1972 Dangerous Drugs Act ===
The Dangerous Drugs Act of 1972 or the Republic Act 6425 was enacted during the administration of President Ferdinand Marcos. The government considers the drug problem in the country as nascent with 20,000 drug users in the country and marijuana as the most preferred drug.

The Dangerous Drugs Board was established on November 14, 1972 with seven national agencies as its initial component members – the Department of Health; Department of Education, Culture and Sports; Department of Justice, Department of National Defense, Department of Finance, and the National Bureau of Investigation.

The Batas Pambansa 179 enacted in 1982 amended the 1972 Dangerous Drugs Act to further itemized prohibited drugs and its derivatives.

In 1995 during Fidel Ramos's presidency, the Dangerous Drug Board adopted the Oplan Iwas Droga as a national program against drug abuse.

=== 2002 Comprehensive Dangerous Drugs Act ===
On July 4, 2001, President Gloria Macapagal Arroyo, through the Letter of Instruction No. 1, instituted a National Anti-Drug Program of Action which aimed for a "drug-free" Philippines by 2010.

The Comprehensive Dangerous Drugs Act of 2002, which was signed into law on January 23, 2002, superseded the 1972 anti-drug law which created the DDB's implementing arm in the Philippine Drug Enforcement Agency (PDEA) and expanded the DDB into a 17-member body which also includes PDEA. In practice however, the DDB and PDEA both claim to be the main anti-drug agency despite PDEA being under the DDB. Also, there was a lack of quorum with at least nine out of 17 members required for the DDB to act. The legislation is noted for having a policy on drug testing.

In 2008, the Supreme Court announced that the mandatory drug testing on drug offenders obliged by the 2002 law is unconstitutional as per Social Justice Society vs. DDB and PDEA. The Commission on Elections Resolution No. 6486, which required candidates for appointive and elected positions to undergo mandatory drug testing, was likewise declared unconstitutional.

A National Anti-Drug Plan of Action for 2015 to 2020 was formulated under the president Benigno Aquino III administration. The policy created by the initiative of the Dangerous Drugs Board and partner agencies was activated in 2015. Under President Benigno Aquino III's term, 77,810 people were arrested by government authorities in connection with the illegal drug trade. Aquino cooperated with Mexico and China in combatting the illegal drug trade.

=== Duterte's war on drugs (2016–22) ===
President Rodrigo Duterte was elected in 2016 through a platform promise focused on dealing with the illegal drug trade and criminality by having drug addicts killed. He launched a bloody war on drugs campaign. Officially, 6,229 drug personalities have been killed as of March 2022. News organizations and human rights groups claim that the death toll is over 12,000.

The Philippine National Police led the drug war through Oplan Double Barrel which began in 2016. It consists of two main components: Oplan Tokhang and Oplan HVT. Tokhang is characterized as the lower barrel approach while HVT, which stands for high value targets, is described as the police's high barrel approach.

Oplan Double Barrel would undergo revisions with its final iteration during the Duterte administration launched in March 14, 2022. Oplan Double Barrel Finale is also known as the Anti-Illegal Drugs Operations Thru Reinforcement and Education (ADORE).

=== Bongbong Marcos administration (2022–) ===
Then-outgoing President Duterte advised then President-elect Bongbong Marcos to continue his campaign against illegal drugs even if its continuation meant its modification. The Anti-Illegal Drugs Operations through Reinforcement and Education (ADORE) program from the previous administration would still be continued to be implemented.

President Marcos announced a policy shift on the Philippines' campaign against illegal drugs. Marcos noted that "drug abuse prevention and education and the improvement of rehabilitation centers will be the focus" of his own campaign. Department of the Interior and Local Government (DILG) Secretary Benjamin Abalos Jr. said that the approach of the government under his watch would be to build "airtight cases" against "big-time" drug traffickers to minimize dismissed cases. Though deaths would still persist, extrajudicial killings would be disavowed as a state policy.

The Philippine National Police placed ADORE under review in August 2024 in an attempt to align the program with the Marcos administration's "recalibrated strategy" of the anti-drug campaign.

== Conduct of drug tests ==
The Comprehensive Dangerous Drugs Act of 2002 obliges mandatory drug testing for specific situations such as firearms license applications, employment, and schooling. It also mandates the devising of two testing methods—a screening test and a confirmatory test to be performed if the former yields a presumptive positive result.

The DDB requires taking urine drug tests in an area where samples are not easily manipulated. Urine tests are also subject to guidelines from the Department of Health. Those who yield positive results are advised to take a drug dependency examination conducted by a physician to manage their drug dependency.

Despite SJC vs. DDB and PDEA of 2008, drug offense subjects are allegedly pressured to undergo mandatory drug testings.

== Legality of certain substances ==
=== Opium ===
Both the 1972 and 2002 laws prohibit opium and its derivatives. This includes "Opium Poppy" which the 2002 law defines as parts of the plants Papaver somniferum, Papaver setigerum, Papaver orientale, Papaver bracteatum, and Papaver rhoeas including substances derived thereof "even for floral, decorative and culinary purposes". This legally prohibits poppy seed used for food. The usage of such ingredient in food by restaurants was brought to attention by Senator Tito Sotto in 2011 despite its illegality.

=== Psilocybin mushrooms ===
The legal status of psilocybin mushrooms as a drug came into light when high school students were reportedly hospitalized after consuming the mushrooms for their psychedelic property in 2019. Psilocybin mushrooms themselves are not in the "list of drugs included in schedule" under the Comprehensive Dangerous Drugs Act of 2002 and therefore, the Philippine Drug Enforcement Agency (PDEA) could not arrest the students and could only issue an advisory against the use of the mushrooms at best. The Philippines is a signatory of the United Nations Convention on Narcotic Drugs which lists psilocybin as a Schedule I substance.

However, the PDEA has conducted arrests of illegal drug peddlers who also sold psilocybin mushrooms alongside explicitly recognized illegal substances in the past.

== See also ==
- Illegal drug trade in the Philippines
