= 2021 Quezon City PNP–PDEA shootout =

Shooting between Philippine law enforcement agencies

- Part of the Philippine drug war
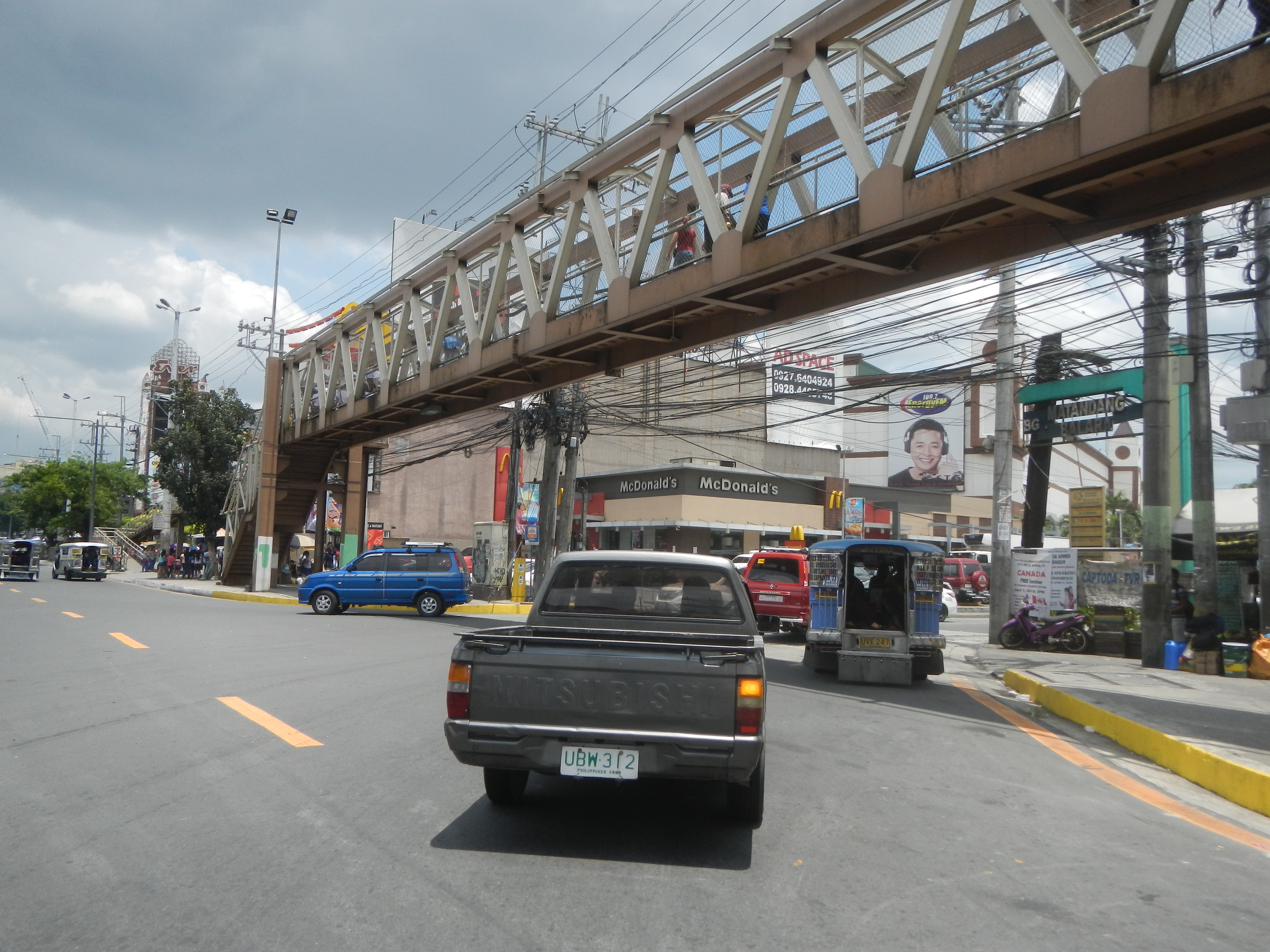
- McDonald's Paragon Place and Don Antonio Pedestrian Overpass
- Date: February 24, 2021; 5 years ago
- Location: McDonald's Paragon Place parking lot, Quezon City, Philippines; 14°40′40.5″N 121°05′01.0″E
- Caused by: Under investigation

Parties
Philippine National Police: Quezon City Police District Special Operations Unit	Philippine Drug Enforcement Agency: Special Enforcement Service

Casualties and losses
2 deaths 1 injured	2 deaths, including 1 informant 3 injured

On February 24, 2021, a botched buy-bust operation resulted in a shootout between units of the Philippine National Police (PNP) and the Philippine Drug Enforcement Agency (PDEA) on Commonwealth Avenue in Quezon City. The incident resulted in the deaths of two police officers, a PDEA agent and an informant. Both agencies claimed that they had been conducting a legitimate anti-drug operation.

== Background and shooting ==
On February 24, 2021, officers of the Quezon City Police District Special Operations Unit (QCPD-DSOU) of the Philippine National Police (PNP) were to conduct a buy-bust operation, following a "sketchy incident report" from the QCPD's Station in Batasan Hills. The operation was supposed to transpire in Quiapo, Manila, but was later relocated to Litex, Quezon City. At around 5:17 p.m. (UTC+8) a white Honda City owned by the Philippine Drug Enforcement Agency (PDEA) was seen coming to a stop at a McDonald's parking lot by the Ever Gotesco Commonwealth Center and a Shell gasoline station after its engine overheated. By 5:57, a white Toyota Hiace, also PDEA-owned, came to a halt by the same parking lot. QCPD Corporals Elvin Garado and Lauro de Guzman Jr were then seen approaching the car. Things quickly escalated as the first shots were discharged, killing both the men and injuring another. Positioned agents from both parties were quick to intervene but as PDEA tried to identify themselves, more shots were fired, marking the start of the hour-long shootout. People nearby rushed to safety, shoppers and employees by the mall gathered outside, and customers of McDonald's sheltered inside the restaurant.

By the time the shooting had ceased and PDEA agents had been detained, footage from all angles had been posted to the media.

== Aftermath and investigation ==
Two police officers died in the friendly fire incident while one police officer and three PDEA agents were injured. An agent and an informant from the PDEA also died as a result of the shootout. Both the PNP and PDEA agreed to execute a joint investigation in response to the incident. The Criminal Investigation and Detection Group (CIDG) was designated by the PNP to lead their investigation, while the regional director of the National Capital Region Police Office (NCRPO) would relay official updates of the PNP's investigation to the public.

The Department of Justice had also ordered the National Bureau of Investigation (NBI) to create a parallel investigation on the incident. The NBI was later designated as the sole investigating body for the incident by President Rodrigo Duterte, who ordered the joint PNP-PDEA investigation to be stopped in a bid to ensure impartiality. Duterte also asked the Senate and the House of Representatives to delay their own investigation on the incident.

Ten police officers and seven PDEA agents were reportedly "restricted" to the CIDG headquarters following the incident.

=== Possible causes ===
The PNP initially characterized the incident as a "misencounter", claiming that the PDEA agents were first to open fire which led to the shootout. While they did consider the claim as one possible account of the incident, they later abandoned it to allow for the ongoing investigation to determine what had happened. The PDEA claims, on its part, that it was the police who started the gunfight and noted that the PDEA were seen identifying themselves to the police in CCTV footage.

Another possibility being considered by the police is that one side may have been conducting a sell-bust operation, where law enforcement agencies pose as drug dealers to apprehend buyers of illegal drugs. It is also being considered that criminal drug syndicates may have created the conditions which led to the shootout between the two law enforcement bodies.

The NBI said in May 2021, that PDEA's informant Untong Matalnas and one of the shootout's casualties, may have acted on his own by pretending to sell drugs to Jonaire Decena. Decena is a detainee who was used as an asset of the PNP for their operation.

=== May 14 incident ===
Another similar incident occurred on May 14, 2021. Quezon City police Novaliches station drug enforcement unit personnel and PDEA agents conducted anti-illegal drugs operations independent of each other in a same parking lot near a shopping mall in Novaliches. A shootout or a "misencounter" was averted after the two groups were able to identify each other. This led to PDEA and PNP officials holding a meeting over the following weekend.

=== Reform ===
PDEA and PNP drafted new guidelines on conducting operations so that they could avoid potential future incidents like the February 2021 shootout. On July 9, 2021, PDEA and PNP signed the Unified Coordination Guidelines, a memorandum circular intended to prevent "misencounters" and miscoordination between the two agencies. Among the key provisions were:

- With coordination with PDEA, only the PNP Drug Enforcement Group (PDEG) and Drug Enforcement Units (DEUs) of regional, district, provincial, city, municipal, and police stations are authorized to conduct anti-illegal drug operations
- Other operating units are only allowed to participate in PDEG / DEUs led operations, which in turn are coordinated with PDEA.
- Only a single anti-drug operation should be conducted in a given area at a particular time covering areas of jurisdiction of PNP stations

== Reactions ==
President Rodrigo Duterte expressed "sadness and concern" over the incident, vowing that an investigation will be made to determine the cause of the shootout. He personally assigned the NBI to discover which law enforcers were at fault for creating the tensions which led to the friendly fire.

General Wilkins Villanueva, director of the PDEA, said in a press conference that the shootout was "the saddest day in the history of drug law enforcement".

Quezon City Mayor Joy Belmonte released a statement following the incident, saying that the local government supports the ongoing investigation. Belmonte also sought the creation of a contingency plan for the city government's response to future incidents, including protocols on crowd and traffic control, and the conduct of simulation exercises.

Senator Panfilo Lacson said that the administration's war on drugs "have not succeeded".
