= Rey Leonardo Guerrero =

Filipino government official

Retired General Rey Leonardo B. Guerrero AFP, GCOL, CCLH, OLH, OAM
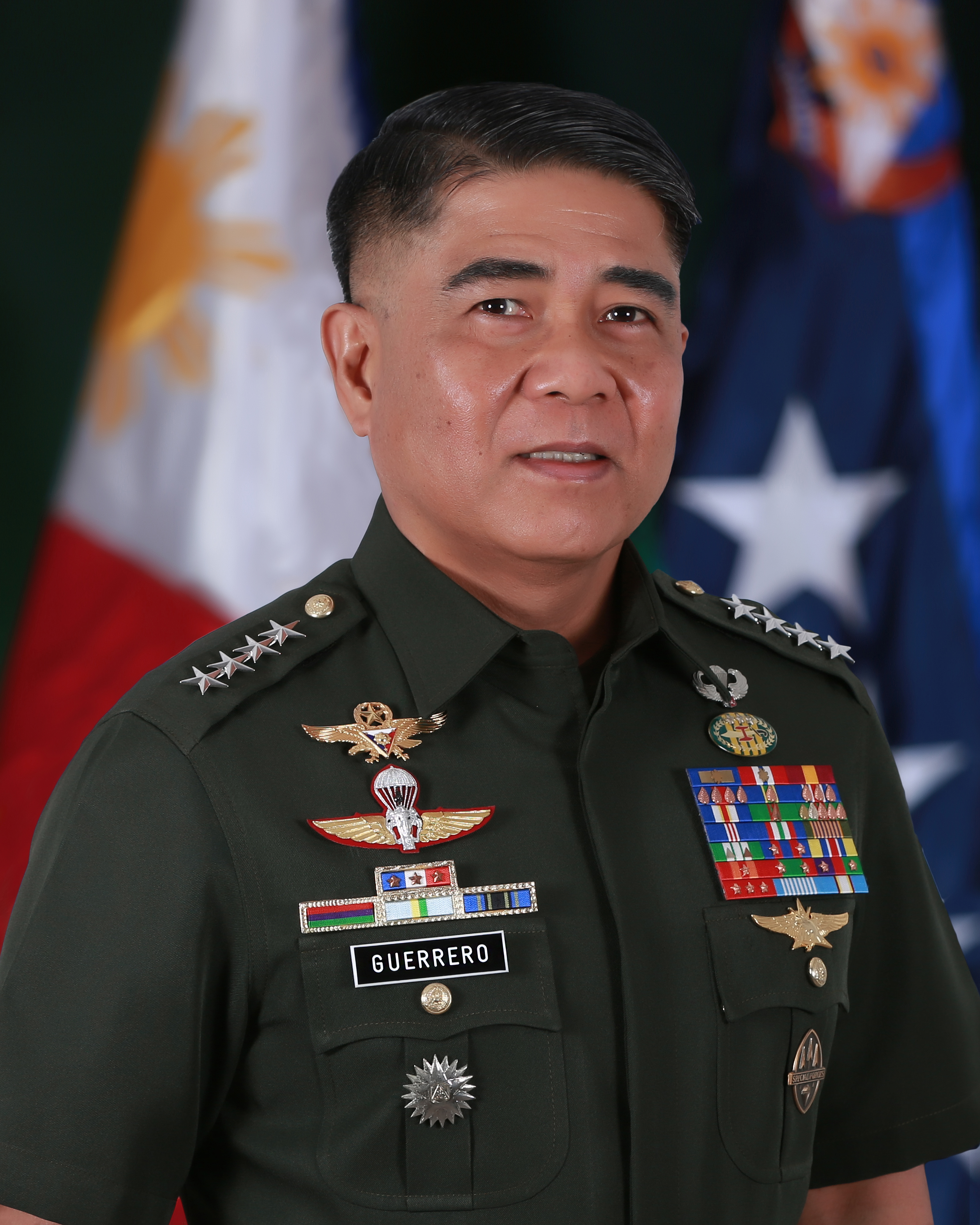

Commissioner of the Bureau of Customs
- In office October 25, 2018 – July 20, 2022
- President: Rodrigo Duterte; Bongbong Marcos
- Preceded by: Isidro Lapeña
- Succeeded by: Yogi Filemon L. Ruiz

Administrator of the Maritime Industry Authority
- In office April 30, 2018 – October 24, 2018
- President: Rodrigo Duterte
- Preceded by: Marcial Q. C. Amaro III
- Succeeded by: Robert Empedrad; Narciso A. Vingson Jr. (OIC)

49th Chief of Staff of the Armed Forces of the Philippines
- In office October 26, 2017 – April 18, 2018
- President: Rodrigo Duterte
- Preceded by: Gen. Eduardo Año
- Succeeded by: Gen. Carlito Galvez Jr.

Personal details
- Born: December 17, 1961 (age 64) Philippines
- Education: Philippine Military Academy; University of the Philippines Diliman
- Nickname: "Jagger"

Military service
- Allegiance: Philippines
- Branch/service: Philippine Army
- Years of service: 1984–2018
- Rank: General
- Unit: Chief of Staff of the Armed Forces of the Philippines; AFP Eastern Mindanao Command; Chief of Staff, Philippine Army; 3rd Infantry Division; AFP Special Operations Command; Presidential Security Group; 701st Infantry Brigade, 7 ID; 61st Infantry Battalion, 3 ID
- Battles/wars: Moro conflict Communist rebellion in the Philippines

Rey Leonardo Borja Guerrero is a retired general of the Philippine Army serving as the Commissioner of the Bureau of Customs under the Duterte administration since 2018. He is a member of the PMA "Maharlika" Class of 1984. Previously, he was the administrator of the Maritime Industry Authority (MARINA) from April to October 2018 and was the Chief of Staff of the Armed Forces of the Philippines from October 2017 to April 2018.

== Military service ==
Before entering military service,he was a student in the University of the Philippines Diliman, where he took his PMA Exams in 1980 before entering the Philippine Military Academy (PMA) the same year, and graduated as a member of the PMA "Maharlika" class of 1984. He was known to be strict, determined, well rounded, and serious, yet very kind-hearted and a great leader, and also attended various military courses locally and abroad, such as the AFP Command and General Staff Course, and the Basic Airborne Course, among others. He is also a qualified member of the Special Forces.

During his 38 years in military service (including spending a total of 4 years as a PMA Cadet), he served as the former commander of the 61st Infantry Battalion of the 3rd Infantry Division, the 701st Infantry Brigade of the 7th Infantry Division, and the Presidential Security Group under the term of then President Gloria Macapagal Arroyo. He also commanded the Special Operations Command and also served as the former Philippine Army chief of staff, where he earned his second star and was promoted to Major General. He also served as commander of the 3rd Infantry Division, before being named as the commander of the AFP Eastern Mindanao Command, where he earned his third star and was promoted to Lieutenant General.

He is often called as "Jagger" as his nickname in the military. He was appointed as the Chief of Staff of the Armed Forces of the Philippines on October 26, 2017, with his term as Chief of Staff of the AFP was extended by President Rodrigo Duterte from December 17, 2017, until April 18, 2018, allowing him to serve his term beyond the mandatory retirement age at 56. He was replaced by the commander of the AFP Western Mindanao Command then-Lieutenant General Carlito Galvez Jr. on April 18, 2018.

== Retirement and post-retirement ==
After his retirement in the AFP, he was named by President Rodrigo Duterte as the next head of the Marina (Maritime Industry Authority), as the agency's administrator after he retired in the AFP. In October 2018, Guerrero was named Commissioner of the Bureau of Customs by President Rodrigo Duterte, replacing Isidro Lapeña after the latter was dismissed and given a new position in TESDA.

On February 12, 2026, Guerrero was appointed as a member of the board of directors of Petron Corporation.

== Awards ==
Left Side:

1st row		Chief Commander, Philippine Legion of Honor	
2nd row	Grand Cross, Order of Lakandula	Officer, Philippine Legion of Honor	Outstanding Achievement Medal
3rd row	5 Distinguished Service Stars with four bronze anahaw clusters	2 Gawad sa Kaunlaran with one bronze anahaw cluster	4 Bronze Cross Medals with four bronze anahaw clusters
4th row	Silver Wing Medal	Military Merit Medals with one spearhead device (35 overall military merit medals)	Military Merit Medals with three bronze anahaws (35 overall military merit medals)
5th row	Sagisag ng Ulirang Kawal	Military Civic Action Medal	Parangal sa Kapanalig ng Sandatahang Lakas ng Pilipinas
6th row	4 Military Commendation Medals	United Nations Service Medal	United Nations Transitional Administration in East Timor (UNTAET) Ribbon
7th row	4 Long Service Medals with three campaign stars	3 Anti-Dissidence Campaign Medals with two campaign stars	Luzon Anti-Dissidence Campaign Medal
8th row	Visayas Anti-Dissidence Campaign Medal with one campaign star	3 Mindanao Anti-Dissidence Campaign Medal with two campaign stars	Disaster Relief and Rehabilitation Operations Ribbon with two campaign stars

Right Side:

1st row		Philippine Republic Presidential Unit Citation	
2nd row	Martial Law Unit Citation	People Power I Unit Citation	People Power II Unit Citation

Badges and Other Awards:

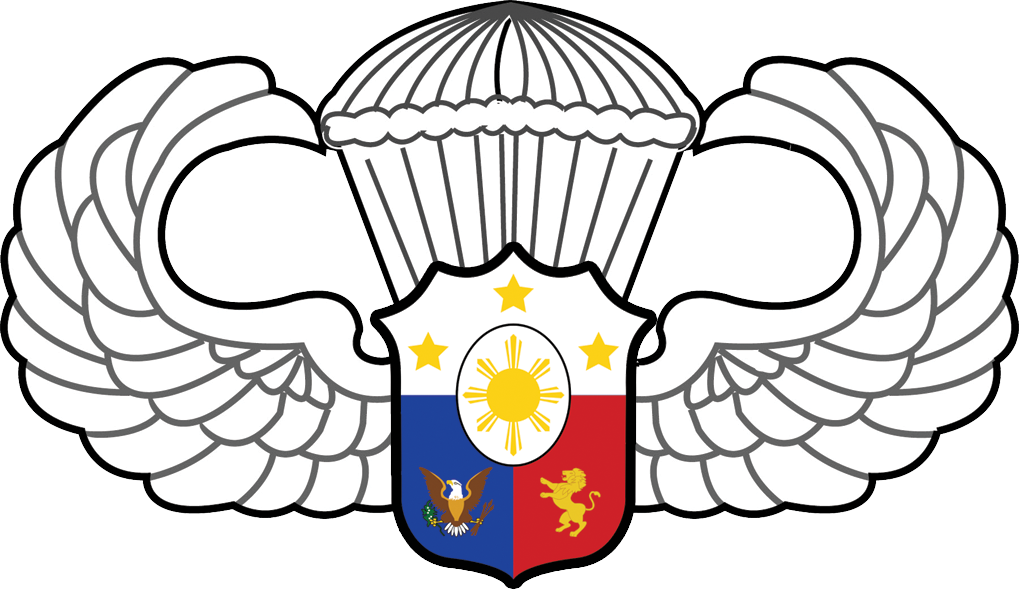
- AFP Parachutist Badge
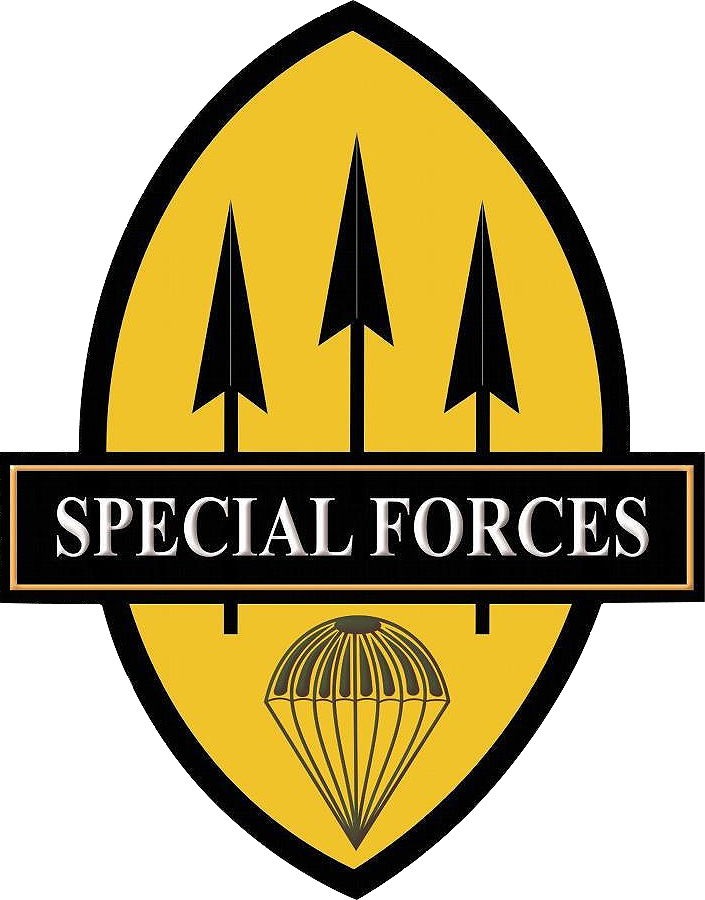
- Special Forces Qualification Badge
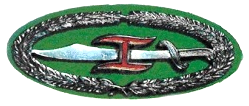
- Combat Commander's Badge
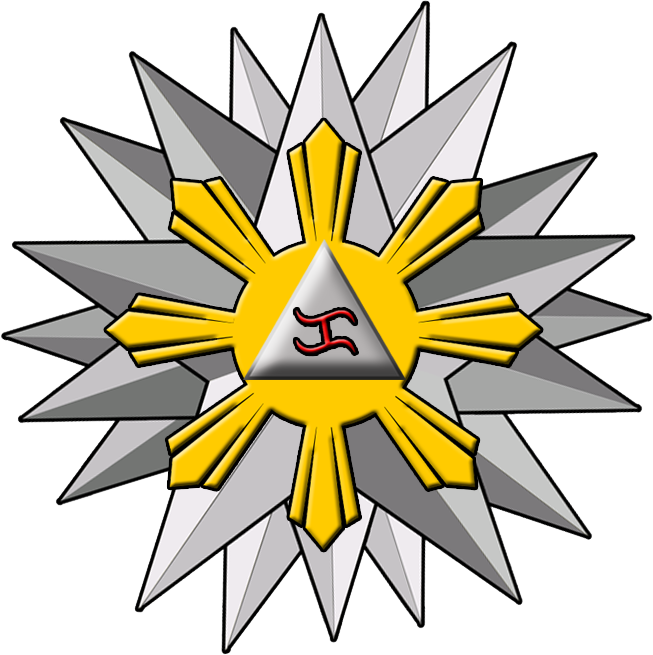
- AFP Command and General Staff Course Badge
- Honorary Airborne Wings - From The Royal Thai Army
- Ulirang Alumnus ng Akademya - from the PMA

== Personal life ==
He is married to Jayne R. Guerrero and has four children.
