= Ismael Sueno =

Filipino politician

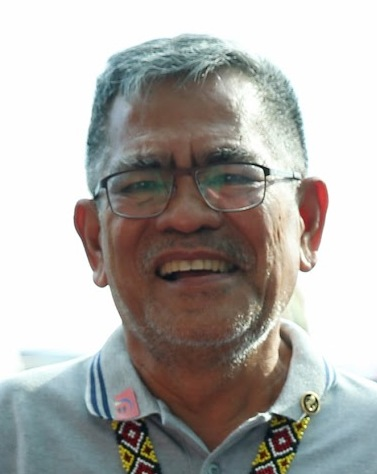
- Sueno in September 2016

26th Secretary of the Interior and Local Government
- In office June 30, 2016 – April 4, 2017
- President: Rodrigo Duterte
- Preceded by: Mel Senen Sarmiento
- Succeeded by: Catalino Cuy (OIC)

Assembly Member of the Southern Philippine Council for Peace and Development
- In office 1997–1998
- President: Fidel Ramos

2nd Governor of South Cotabato
- In office 1986–1992
- Preceded by: Sergio Morales
- Succeeded by: Hilario de Pedro III

Mayor of Koronadal
- In office 1980–1986
- Vice Mayor: Fernando Miguel
- Preceded by: Gerardo Calaliman
- Succeeded by: Hilario de Pedro III

Vice Mayor of Koronadal
- In office 1975–1980
- Mayor: Gerardo Calaliman
- Preceded by: Frederico Dizon
- Succeeded by: Fernando Miguel

Personal details
- Born: Ismael Dres Sueno Koronadal, Cotabato, Philippines
- Party: PDP–Laban; Probinsya Muna Development Initiative
- Spouse: Jocelyn Bernardo Sueño
- Education: Our Lady of Perpetual Help Seminary
- Occupation: Businessman

Ismael "Mike" Dres Sueno (born July 1947 or 1948) is the former Secretary of the Philippine Department of the Interior and Local Government. He was appointed by President Rodrigo Duterte to replace Mel Senen Sarmiento starting June 30, 2016. A member and former national chairman of PDP–Laban, he served as Governor of South Cotabato under President Corazon Aquino. On April 4, 2017, Sueno was dismissed as Secretary of the Interior and Local Government by Duterte due to 'loss of trust and confidence'.

== Early life and education ==
Sueno was born and raised in Koronadal, then known as Marbel, in the former undivided Province of Cotabato. His parents were Perfecto Sueno Sr., the first municipal vice mayor of Koronadal, and Ma. Neri Dres. He has five brothers (Rolando, Perfecto Jr., Roberto, Leo and Joseph), and one sister (Corazon), some of which have already migrated to the United States. He obtained his associate degree in arts from Our Lady of Perpetual Help Seminary in Marbel in 1964. He then pursued his Bachelor of Arts degree in philosophy from the Regional Major Seminary.

== Political career ==
Sueno was elected municipal mayor of Koronadal in 1980 during the administration of President Ferdinand Marcos. In 1986, following the People Power Revolution, he was appointed by President Corazon Aquino as officer-in-charge (OIC) governor of the province of South Cotabato. He then served a full term as provincial governor from 1988 to 1992. During his term as governor, he pursued several environmental and reforestation programs integrated with livelihood projects. He imposed a total logging ban in the province and also helped organize and strengthen local cooperatives.

In 1997, Sueno was appointed to the Southern Philippine Council for Peace and Development (SPCPD) Consultative Assembly by President Fidel Ramos. He was an unsuccessful candidate for vice president and running mate to Emilio Osmeña on the Probinsya Muna Development Initiative (PROMDI) ticket in the 1998 presidential election.

Sueno ran for congressman of South Cotabato's 2nd District in 2001 but lost to Arthur Y. Pingoy Jr. In 2007, he made another unsuccessful bid for Vice Governor of the province under the administration party.

He was appointed Secretary of the Interior and Local Government by President Rodrigo Duterte on June 30, 2016. On April 4, 2017, he was reported by Justice Secretary Vitaliano Aguirre as having been fired from his office by the president due to corruption allegations.

Political offices
Preceded by Gerardo Calaliman	Mayor of Koronadal; 1980–1986	Succeeded by Hilario de Pedro III
Preceded by Sergio Morales	Governor of South Cotabato; 1986–1992	Succeeded by Hilario de Pedro III
Preceded by Mel Senen Sarmiento	Secretary of the Interior and Local Government; 2016–2017	Succeeded by Catalino Cuy; Officer-in-charge
Party political offices
Preceded by Jejomar Binay	Chairman of PDP–Laban; 2014–2016	Succeeded by Rodrigo Duterte
