= Bureau of Customs =

Philippine customs government agency

Bureau of Customs Kawanihan ng Adwana
- Seal of the Bureau of Customs

- Ensign of the Bureau of Customs
- Common name: Bureau of Customs
- Abbreviation: BoC, BOC

Agency overview
- Formed: February 6, 1902; 124 years ago
- Employees: 3,553 (2024)
- Annual budget: ₱2.58 billion (2021)

Jurisdictional structure
- National agency: Philippines
- Operations jurisdiction: Philippines
- Specialist jurisdiction: Customs, excise, gambling

Operational structure
- Headquarters: POM Building, Port Area, Manila, Philippines
- Elected officer responsible: Frederick Go, Secretary of the Department of Finance
- Agency executive: Atty. Charlito Martin R. Mendoza, Commissioner
- Parent agency: Department of Finance

Website
- www.customs.gov.ph

The Bureau of Customs (BoC or BOC; Filipino: Kawanihan ng Adwana) is a Philippine government agency that is responsible for the collecting of customs duties, excise duties, and other indirect taxes in the Philippines. It is part of the Philippine Department of Finance.

The Bureau of Customs was established on February 6, 1902, by the Insular Government of the Philippine Islands when it was under control of the United States, during the American colonial period of the Philippines.

== History ==
Prior to European colonization, people in the Philippines traded with others from Southeast Asia. Since money was not yet the medium of exchange, people bartered commodities. The rulers of the barangays collected tributes from the people before they were allowed to engage in trade. The practice of collecting tributes became part of the Customs Law of the Land.

=== The Spanish colonial era ===
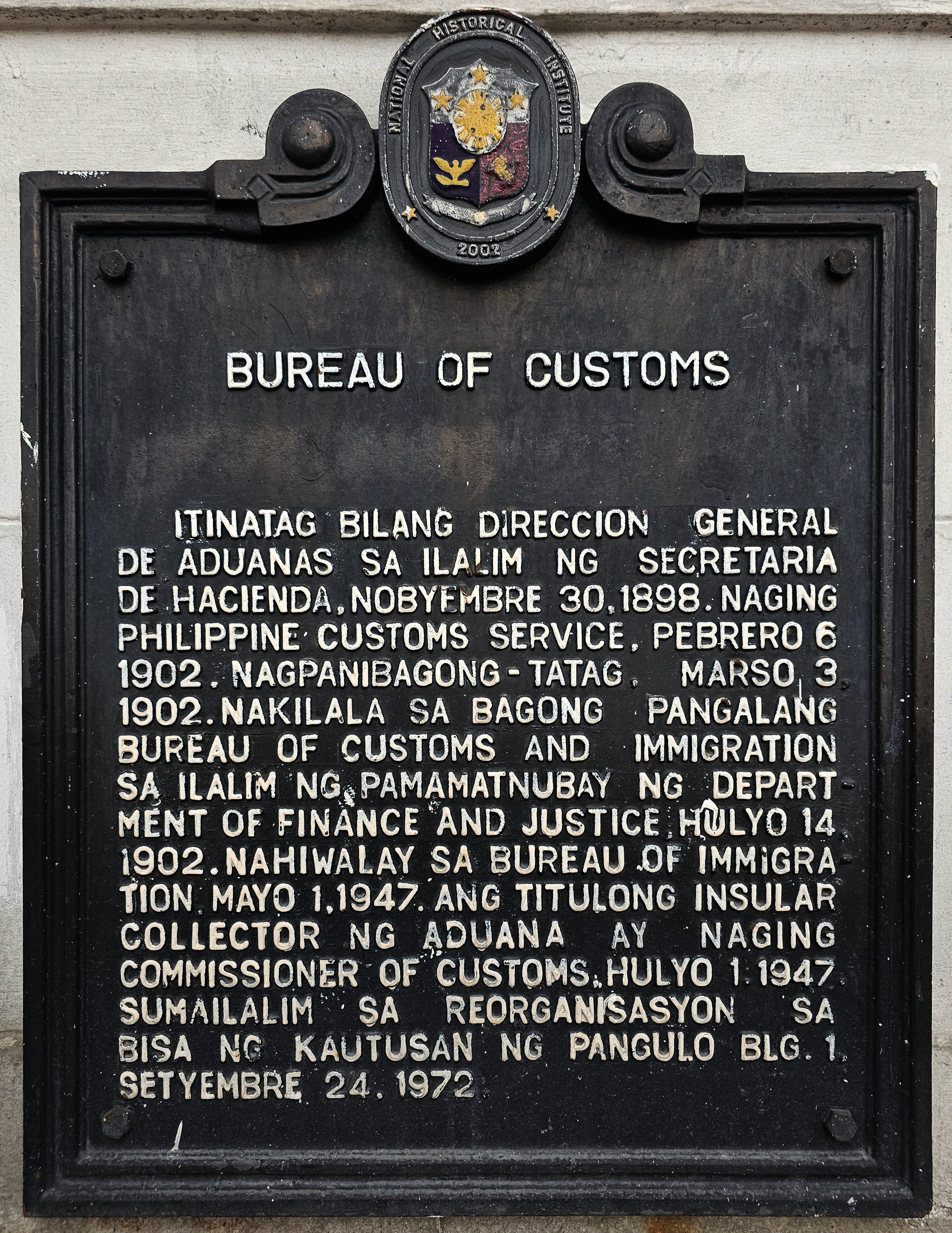
National historical marker installed in 2002 at the Customs head office

During the Spanish Colonial Era of the Philippines, Spain passed three important statutes:

- Spanish Customs Law which was similar to that of the Indies enforced in the country from 1582 to 1828. It was a concept of ad valorem levied on import and export.
- A Tariff Board was established which drew up a tariff of fixed values for all imported articles on which ten percent (10%) ad valorem duty was uniformly collected.
- Another Tariff Law was introduced in 1891, which established the specific duties on all imports and on certain exports and this lasted till the end of the Spanish rule in the Philippines.

=== The American colonial era ===
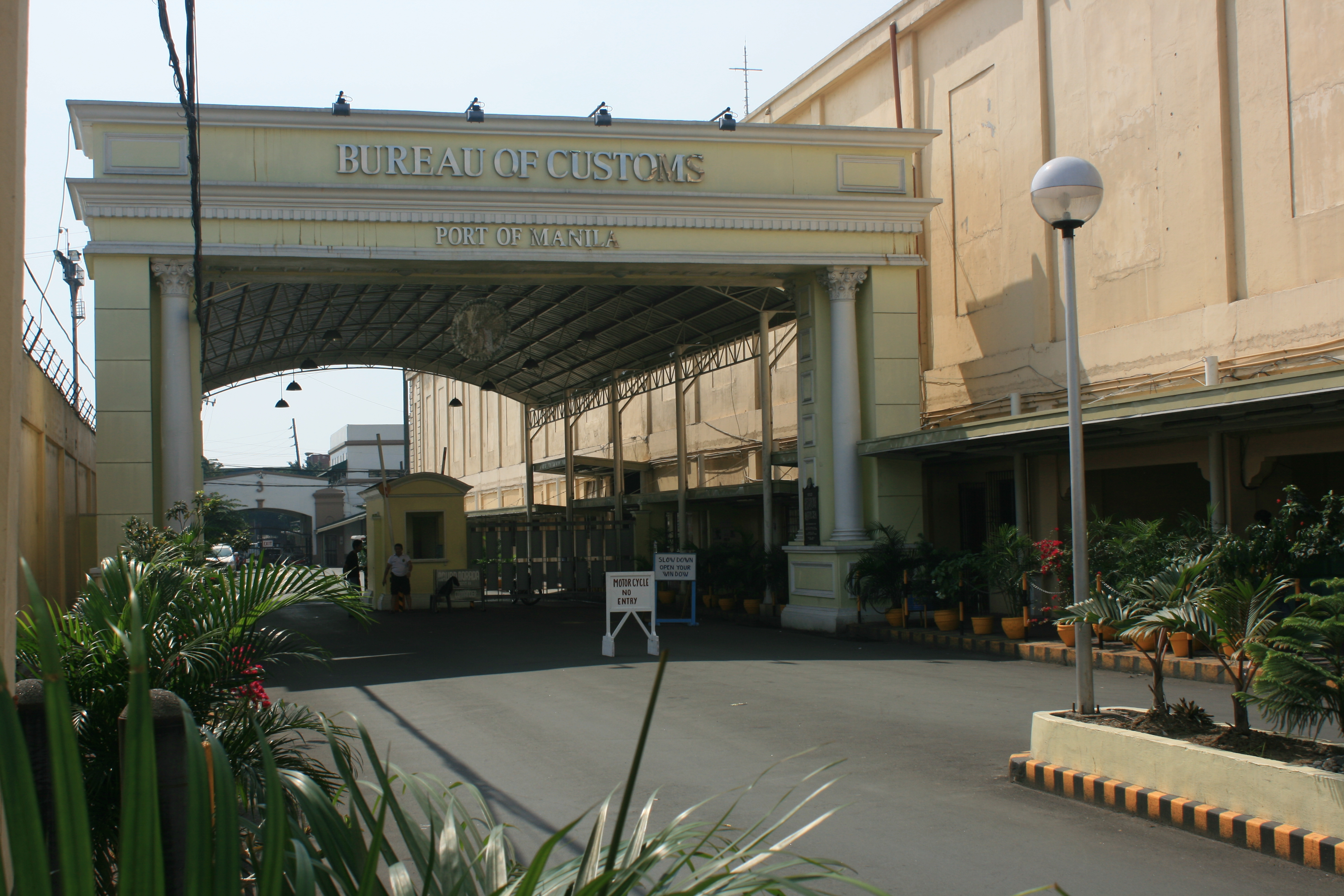
Customs Building, Manila

When the Americans came to the Philippines, the Military Government continued to enforce the Spanish Tariff Code of 1891, which remained in effect until the Philippine Commission enacted the Tariff Revision Law of 1901.

On October 24, 1900, the Philippine Commission passed Act No. 33 abolishing and changing the position of Captain of the Port to Collector of Customs in all ports of entry except the Port of Manila. The designation of the Captain of the Port in the Port of Manila was retained.

When the Civil Government was established in the Philippines, the most important laws passed by the Philippine Commission were the following:

- Tariff Revision Law of 1902 based on the theory that the laws of Spain were not as comprehensive as the American Customs Laws to conform with the existing conditions of the country.
- Philippine Administrative Act No. 355 passed by the Philippine Commission on February 6, 1902. The full implementation of this Act, however, was considered inadequate and incomplete, so the Customs Service Act No. 355, called the Philippine Customs Service Act was passed to amend the previous laws. After several modifications and amendments, the Philippine Customs Service finally became a practical counterpart of the American Customs Service.
- Act No. 357 reorganized the Philippine Customs Service and officially designated the Insular Collector of Customs as Collector of Customs for the Port of Manila.
- Act No. 625 abolished the Captain of the Port for the Port of Manila.
- Public Act No. 430 transformed the Philippine Customs Service to a Bureau of Customs and Immigration under the supervision and control of the Department of Finance and Justice.

When the Department of Justice became a separate office from the Department of Finance, the customs service remained under the umbrella of the latter which set-up remained up to this time.

=== The Commonwealth Government ===
After the Philippine Commonwealth was established, the Philippine Legislature enacted Commonwealth Act No. 613 forming the Bureau of Immigration as a separate office from the Bureau of Customs.

=== The Republic ===
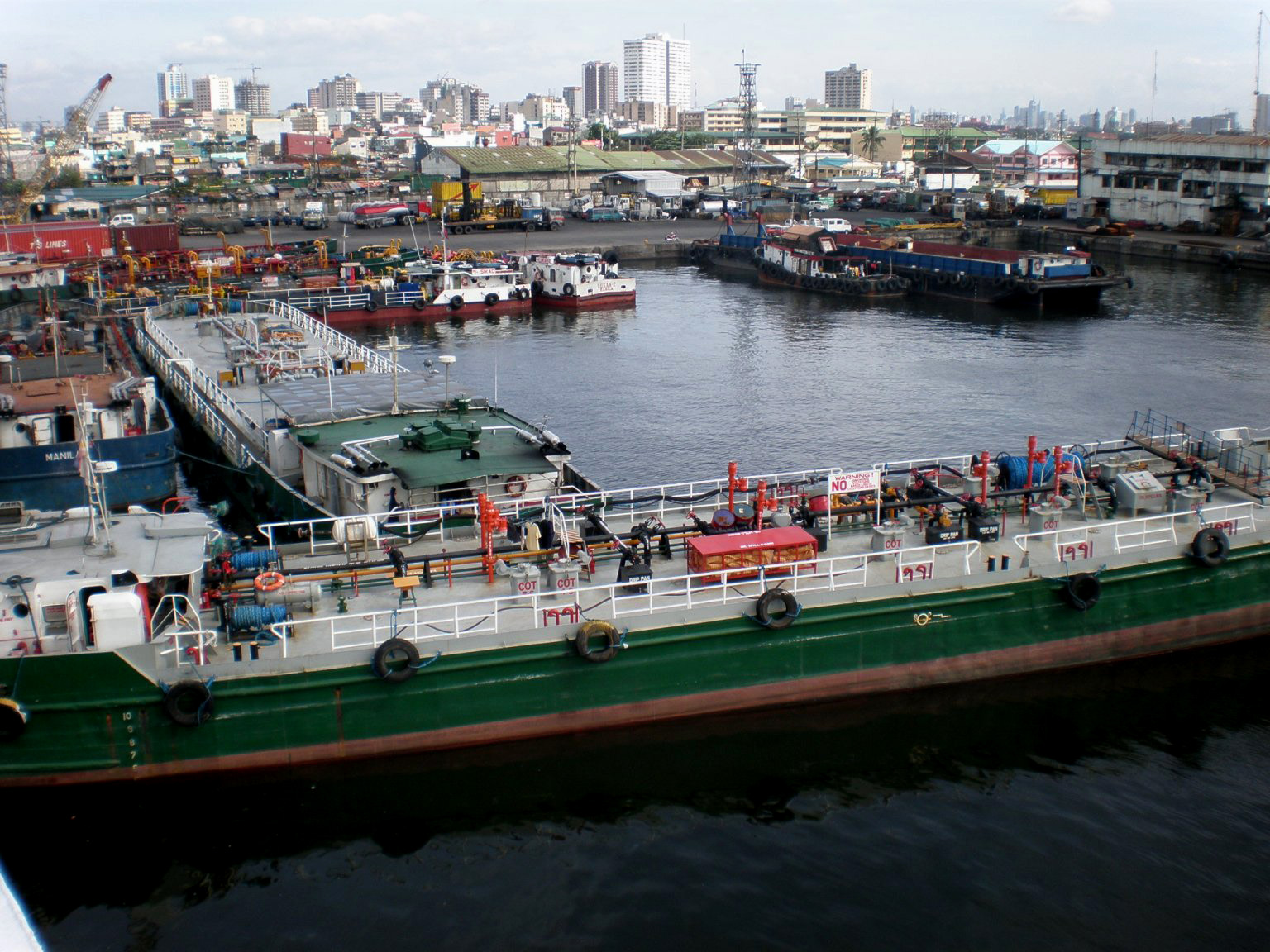
Manila North Harbor

On May 1, 1947, the Bureau of Customs has as its head the Insular Collector of Customs. He was assisted by the Deputy Insular Collector of Customs. Both officials were concurrently Collector of Customs and the Deputy Collector of Customs of the Port of Manila. The Republic Pursuant to the Executive Order No. 94 of Republic Act No. 52, the President of the Philippines reorganized the different departments, bureaus, offices and agencies of the government of the Republic of the Philippines. Consequently, the Insular Collector of Customs was changed to Collector of Customs for the Port of Manila. The reorganization took effect on July 1, 1947.

In 1957, Congress enacted the Tariff and Customs Code of the Philippines known as Republic Act No. 1937, otherwise known as the “Tariff Law of the Republic of the Philippines”. This took effect on July 1, 1957. The passage of this act by the defunct Congress of the Philippines subject to the provisions of the Laurel-Langley Agreement, became the first official expression of an autonomous Philippine Tariff Policy.

Before the passage of Republic Act 1937, all importations from the United States enjoyed full exemptions pursuant to the Tariff Act No. 1902 which was adopted by Republic Act No. 3 as the Tariff Laws of the Philippines.

=== 2017 drug smuggling scandal ===
On May 28, 2017, the Bureau of Customs (BOC) seized ₱6.4 billion worth of methamphetamine in two warehouses in Barangay Ugong of Valenzuela, Metro Manila. The BOC said that they acted on an intelligence report from the Chinese General Administration of Customs. The seizure was made in accordance to a Letter of Authority issued by BOC Commissioner Nicanor Faeldon. The BOC officials were accompanied by personnel of the National Bureau of Investigation and Philippine Drug Enforcement Agency who inspected the warehouses found the contraband in five metal cylinders.

During the Senate and House hearings, details on how the shipment was smuggled into the Philippines were given. On May 16, 2017, the ship Guang Ping Voyage No. 1719S, which carried the container with the methamphetamine arrived at the Manila International Container Port (MICP) in Tondo, Manila. The cargo of the ship was lodged on the next day by Customs broker, Teejay Marcellana, who claims that the shipment contained kitchenware. The following day, the importer of the goods, EMT Trading, which is owned by Eirene Tatad, paid the customs and duties for the shipment. The firm says that they were not aware of the illegal drugs inside the shipment. The shipment was then passed through the green lane where shipments were not scanned through X-ray. According to protocol, shipments accepted by first-time importers or from China were not allowed to be passed through the green lane. A truck registered under Golden Strike Logistics transported the container from the MICP on May 23. Chinese businessman Richard Tan, also known as Chen Ju Long, narrated during the congressional hearing that he called the Bureau of Customs at 11pm after he was informed about the illegal drugs shipment. Customs broker, Mark Taguba claims that Tan was behind the smuggling of the drugs who says that he was hired by the businessman to "fix" the shipment through a middle man named Kenneth Dong.

The Philippine Senate Blue Ribbon Committee investigated and called the BOC personnel with links to the case as either incompetent or corrupt.

=== Present ===
In November 2021, the BOC's Enforcement and Security Service (ESS) introduced a new tactical uniform for frontline officers.

== Functions ==
The Bureau has the following duties under the 2015 Customs Modernization and Tariff Act (RA 10863):

1. Assessment and collection of customs revenues from imported goods and other dues, fees, charges, fines and penalties accruing under the CMTA;
2. Simplification and harmonization of customs procedures to facilitate movement of goods in international trade;
3. Border control to prevent entry of smuggled goods;
4. Prevention and suppression of smuggling and other customs fraud;
5. Facilitation and security of international trade and commerce through an informed compliance program;
6. Supervision and control over the entrance and clearance of vessels and aircraft engaged in foreign commerce;
7. Supervision and control over the handling of foreign mails arriving in the Philippines for the purpose of collecting revenues and preventing the entry of contraband;
8. Supervision and control on all import and export cargoes, landed or stored in piers, airports, terminal facilities, including container yards and freight stations for the protection of government revenue and prevention of entry of contraband;
9. Conduct a compensation study with the end view of developing and recommending to the President a competitive compensation and remuneration system to attract and retain highly qualified personnel, while ensuring that the Bureau remains financially sound and sustainable;
10. Exercise of exclusive original jurisdiction over forfeiture cases under the CMTA; and
11. Enforcement of the CMTA and all other laws, rules and regulations related to customs administration.

== Organization ==
=== Office of the Commissioner (OCOM) ===
The Bureau of Customs is headed by a Commissioner, who is responsible for the general administration and management of the bureau. The Commissioner is assisted by six Deputy Commissioners and an Assistant Commissioner, who supervises the Internal Administration Group, Revenue Collection Monitoring Group, Assessment and Operations Coordination Group, Intelligence Group, Enforcement Group, Management Information System and Technology Group and Post Clearance Audit Group.

=== Customs Intelligence and Investigation Service (CIIS) ===
The Customs Intelligence and Investigation Service (CIIS) is the service of the Bureau mandated to the collection, collation, and evaluation of data and information on acts of economic sabotage and the conduct of surveillance, investigation and apprehension of cases involving violations of customs, tariff laws and regulations.

=== Customs Districts ===
The Bureau of Customs has 17 Customs Districts (as enumerated below). Each Customs District is headed and supervised by a District Collector, assisted by as many Deputy District Collectors as may be necessary. A Customs District has a designated “principal port of entry”. Generally, a principal port of entry has its “sub-port(s) of entry”.

Customs District	Principal Port of Entry	City/Municipality
Customs District I	Port of San Fernando	San Fernando, La Union
Customs District II-A	Port of Manila (POM)	Manila (Port Area)
Customs District II-B	Manila International Container Port (MICP)	Manila (Tondo)
Customs District III	Ninoy Aquino International Airport (NAIA)	Pasay
Customs District IV	Port of Batangas	Batangas City
Customs District V	Port of Legazpi	Legazpi, Albay
Customs District VI	Port of Iloilo	Iloilo City
Customs District VII	Port of Cebu	Cebu City
Customs District VIII	Port of Tacloban	Tacloban
Customs District IX	Port Surigao	Surigao City
Customs District X	Port of Cagayan de Oro	Cagayan de Oro
Customs District XI	Port of Zamboanga	Zamboanga City
Customs District XII	Port of Davao	Davao City
Customs District XIII	Port of Subic	Olongapo, Zambales / Morong, Bataan (Subic Freeport Zone)
Customs District XIV	Port of Clark	Mabalacat, Pampanga (Clark Freeport Zone)
Customs District XV	Port of Aparri	Aparri, Cagayan
Customs District XVI	Port of Limay	Limay, Bataan

== Commissioners ==
Image	Name	Term	
Image	Name	Start	End
Insular Collectors of the Port of Manila (1902–1946)
	Morgan Anhister	1902	1916
	J.S. Stanley	1916	1918
	Vicente Aldenese	1918	1937
	Guillermo Gomez	1937	1945
	Melencio Fabros	1945	1946
Commissioners (1946–present)
	Alfredo de Leon	1947	1950
	Alfredo Jacinto	1950	1954
	Jaime Velasquez	1954	1955
	Manuel Manahan	1955	1957
	Eleuterio Capapas	1957	1960
	Timoteo Aseron	1960	1960
	Eleuterio Capapas	1960	1961
	Rolando Geotina	1961	1961
	Cesar Climaco	1962	1962
	Norberto Romualdez, Jr.	1962	1963
	Rodrigo Perez, Jr.	1963	1964
	Jose B. Lingad	January 1964	July 15, 1964
	Alfredo de Joya	July 15, 1964	1965
	Pablo Mariano	1965	1965
	Jacinto Gavino	1965	1966
	Juan Ponce Enrile	1966	1968
	Rolando Geotina	1968	1975
	Alfredo Pio de Roda, Jr.	1975	1977
	Ramon Farolan	1977	1986
	Wigberto Tañada	1986	1987
	Alexander Padilla	1987	1987
	Salvador Mison	1987	1991
	Tomas Apacible	1991	1992
	Guillermo Parayno, Jr.	1992	1998
	Pedro Mendoza, Jr.	1998	1998
	Nelson Tan	1998	1999
	Renato Ampil	1999	2001
	Titus Villanueva	2001	2002
	Antonio Bernardo	2002	2004
	George Jereos	2004	2005
	Alberto Lina	February 4, 2005	July 8, 2005
	Alexander Arevalo	July 2005	December 2005
	Napoleon Morales	January 2006	July 2010
	Angelito Alvarez	July 2010	September 2011
	Ruffy Biazon	September 2011	December 2013
	John Philip Sevilla	December 2013	April 2015
	Alberto Lina	April 23, 2015	June 30, 2016
	Nicanor Faeldon	June 30, 2016	August 30, 2017
	Isidro Lapeña	August 30, 2017	October 31, 2018
	Rey Leonardo Guerrero	October 31, 2018	July 20, 2022
	Yogi Filemon Ruiz	July 20, 2022	February 10, 2023
	Bienvenido Y. Rubio	February 10, 2023	June 30, 2025
	Ariel Nepomuceno	June 30, 2025	November 12, 2026
	Charlito Martin R. Mendoza	November 13, 2026	

== See also ==
- Department of Finance
- Bureau of Customs Transformers (basketball)
- Bureau of Customs Transformers (volleyball)
