= Isidro Lapeña =

Filipino retired police officer and former government official

The Honourable Isidro Lapeña Ph.D., CSEE
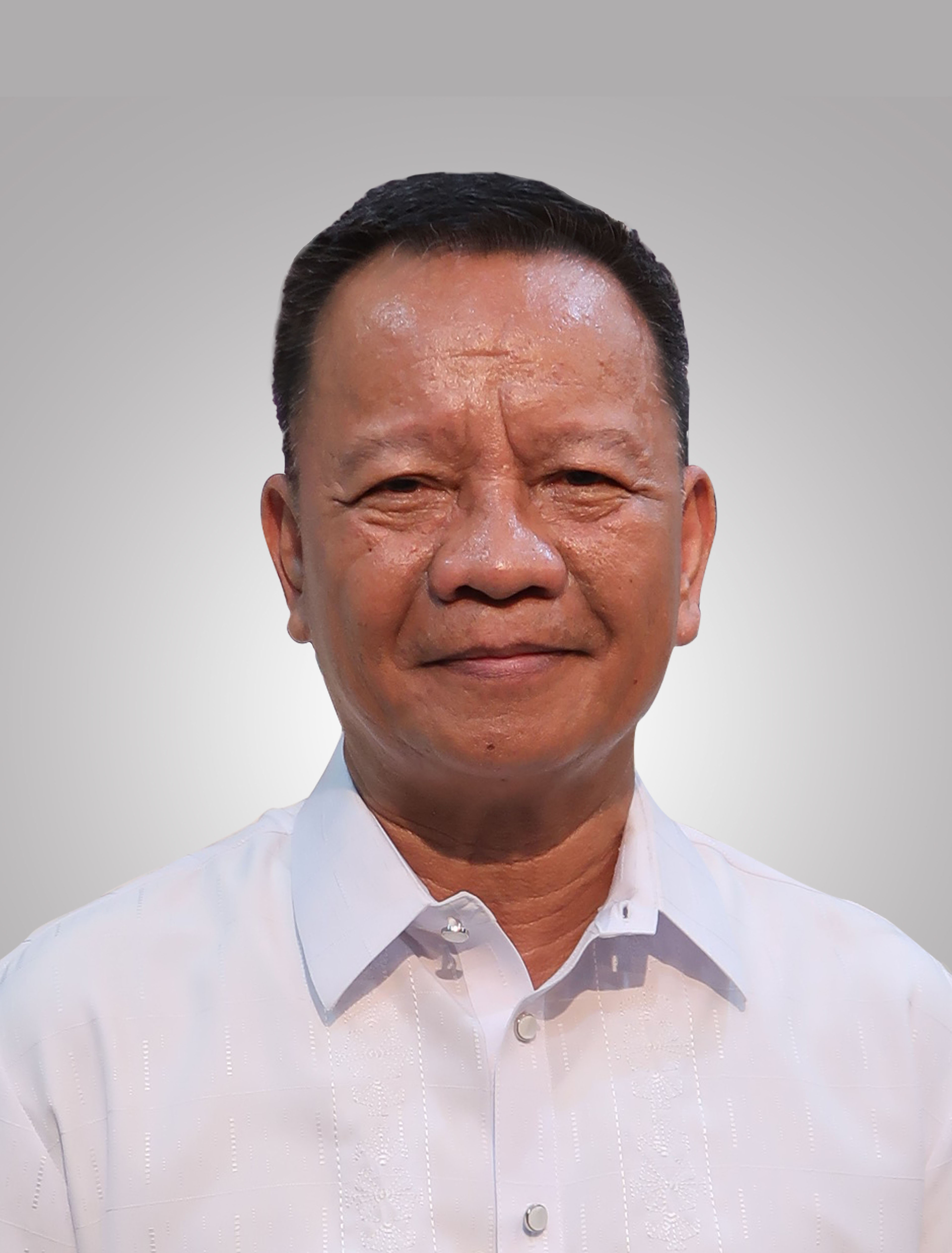
- Lapeña in 2017

Director General of Technical Education and Skills Development Authority
- In office October 25, 2018 – June 30, 2022
- President: Rodrigo Roa Duterte
- Preceded by: Sec. Guiling A. Mamondiong
- Succeeded by: Sec. Danilo P. Cruz

Commissioner of the Bureau of Customs
- In office August 30, 2017 – October 25, 2018
- President: Rodrigo Roa Duterte
- Preceded by: Nicanor Faeldon
- Succeeded by: Rey Leonardo Guerrero

Director General of Philippine Drug Enforcement Agency
- In office July 2016 – August 2017
- President: Rodrigo Roa Duterte
- Preceded by: Arturo G. Cacdac, Jr.
- Succeeded by: Aaron N. Aquino

Personal details
- Born: Isidro S. Lapeña; January 2, 1950 (age 76)
- Education: Philippine Military Academy (BS)
- Police career
- Service: Philippine National Police
- Divisions: Directorate for Operations; Davao City Police Office
- Service years: 1973–2006
- Rank: Police Deputy Director General

Isidro S. Lapeña (born January 2, 1951) is a Filipino retired police officer and former government official former served as director general of Technical Education and Skills Development Authority, Philippine Drug Enforcement Agency, and commissioner of Bureau of Customs.

== Police career ==
Graduate of PMA Maagap Class of 1973, notable police assignment of Lapeña was being the Davao City Police Chief under then-Mayor Rodrigo Duterte. Lapeña's batchmates are former police general Thompson Lantion, and former Defense Secretary Delfin Lorenzana. Lapeña also served as Directorate for Operations, and later served as deputy chief for operations and retired on January 2, 2007, with the rank of Deputy Director General (3-star rank).

== Civilian career ==
Lapeña was appointed by then-President Duterte as director of the Philippine Drug Enforcement Agency from July 12, 2016, to August 30, 2017. He conducted operations against "high value targets" in the Philippine drug war and was in charge of verifying drug watchlists that identified suspects for "neutralization".

He was reassigned at Bureau of Customs on August 30, 2017. But, in 2018, he was implicated in the Custom's drug smuggling scandal, and other officials for smuggling of the ₱11 billion worth of methamphetamine, locally known as shabu which was discovered inside the magnetic lifters in a warehouse in General Mariano Alvarez, Cavite. He claimed it was only a demolition job against him, will not resign, and did not show up in the Senate probe. The Department of Justice later halted probe process, after Lapeña was reassigned.

On October 25, 2018, he was reassigned again, this time at the Technical Education and Skills Development Authority as its director general. He served until June 30, 2022.

Lapeña is among the "Davao Boys", a small circle of Duterte's trusted associates, which included police officers who were previously posted to Davao, implemented the nationwide drug war, and were afterwards given choice government assignments.

On February 13, 2026, the International Criminal Court included Lapeña among eight indirect co-perpetrators in the crimes against humanity case against president Duterte during the Philippine drug war.
