= Catalino Cuy =

Filipino politician

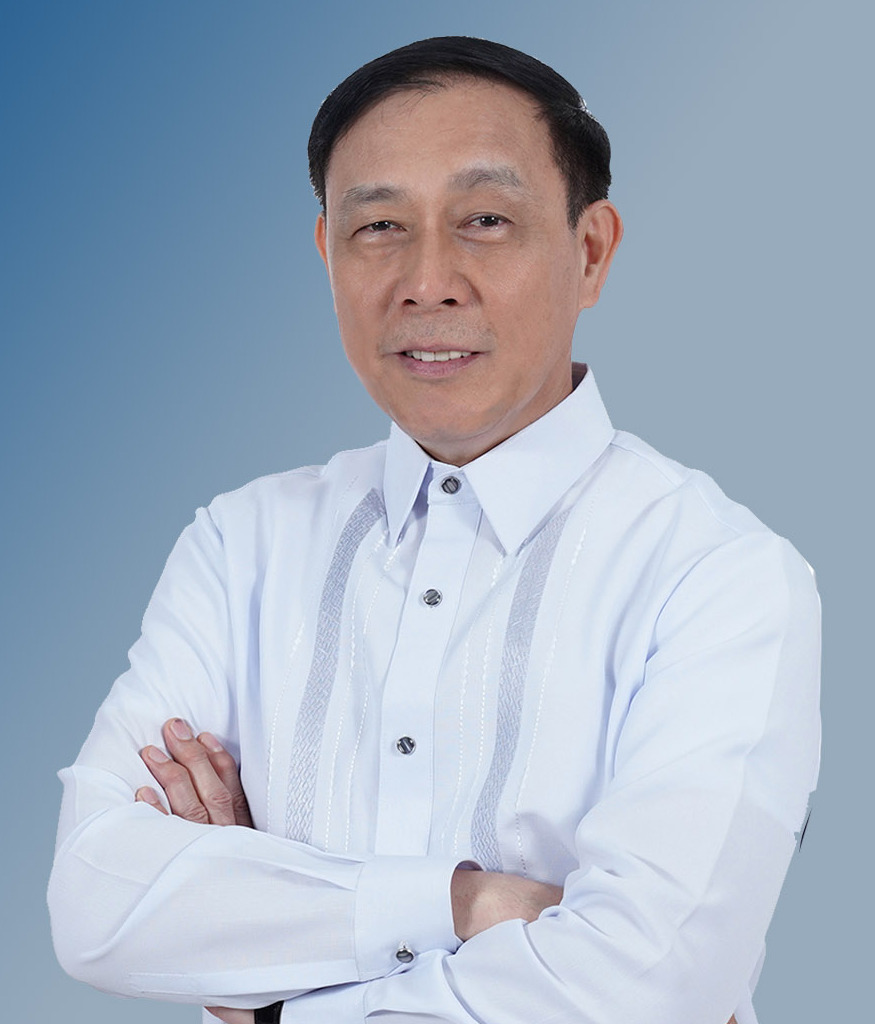

Chairman of Dangerous Drugs Board
- In office January 4, 2018 – February 7, 2025
- President: Rodrigo Duterte; Bongbong Marcos
- Preceded by: Dionisio Santiago
- Succeeded by: PMGen. Oscar F. Valenzuela (Ret.)

Secretary of Department of Interior and Local Government
- Officer-In-Charge
- In office April 5, 2017 – December 11, 2017
- President: Rodrigo Duterte
- Preceded by: Ismael Sueno
- Succeeded by: Eduardo Año

Undersecretary for Peace and Order of the Department of the Interior and Local Government
- In office July 1, 2016 – April 4, 2017
- President: Rodrigo Duterte

Personal details
- Born: Catalino Salandanan Cuy; November 25, 1957 (age 68) Philippines
- Education: Mapúa Institute of Technology; Philippine Military Academy; Manuel L. Quezon University

Military service
- Allegiance: Philippines
- Branch/service: Philippine Constabulary (former); Philippine National Police
- Police career
- Service: Philippine National Police
- Divisions: Davao Oriental Police Provincial Office; Davao City Police Office; Directorate for Human Resource and Doctrine Development; Directorate for Personnel and Records Management; Special Action Force
- Service years: 1981 – 2012
- Rank: Police Major General

Catalino "Lito" Salandanan Cuy (born November 25, 1957) is a Filipino retired police director and who served as chairman of the Dangerous Drugs Board under the Duterte administration and Marcos administration from 2018 to 2025. He assumed the role of Officer-in-Charge of the Department of Interior and Local Government on April 5, 2017, upon the departure of Ismael Sueno who was dismissed by President Duterte following corruption allegations.

== Education ==
Cuy completed three years of studying Bachelor of Science in Electrical Engineering from the Mapúa Institute of Technology in Manila in 1977. The following year, he moved to Baguio to study at the Philippine Military Academy where he graduated as part of the Dimalupig Class of 1981. Cuy also received a master's degree in Public Administration from the Manuel L. Quezon University in 1994.

== Career ==
Cuy began his career in law enforcement after graduating from the Philippine Military Academy in 1981. He served as an aide of President Fidel Ramos before being assigned in Mindanao to join the Philippine National Police (PNP). He served as the Provincial Director of the Davao Oriental Police Office for three years starting 2002. In 2005, he was appointed as the Director of the Davao City Police Office under then Mayor Rodrigo Duterte. As Davao police chief, he, along with 20 other police officers, was charged with negligence in 2012 and fined an equivalent of a month's salary by the Office of the Ombudsman for failing to control the summary killings by the alleged Davao death squads between 2005 and 2008. Following his stint in Mindanao, he became the Deputy Director for Personnel and Records Management in 2009.

In 2010, Cuy was appointed as Commander of the PNP Special Action Force. Two years later, he served as Director for Human Resource and Doctrine Development before being designated as Director for Personnel and Records Management by then Director General Alan Purisima in December 2012. Upon retirement from the PNP, Cuy joined the administration of President Rodrigo Duterte as DILG Undersecretary in July 2016, and as officer-in-charge of the department in April 2017. He was appointed chairperson of the Dangerous Drugs Board on January 4, 2018.

Political offices
| Preceded by Ismael Sueno | Secretary of the Interior and Local Government; Officer in Charge; 2017–2018 | Succeeded by Eduardo Año |
