= Nicanor Faeldon =

Filipino former Marine

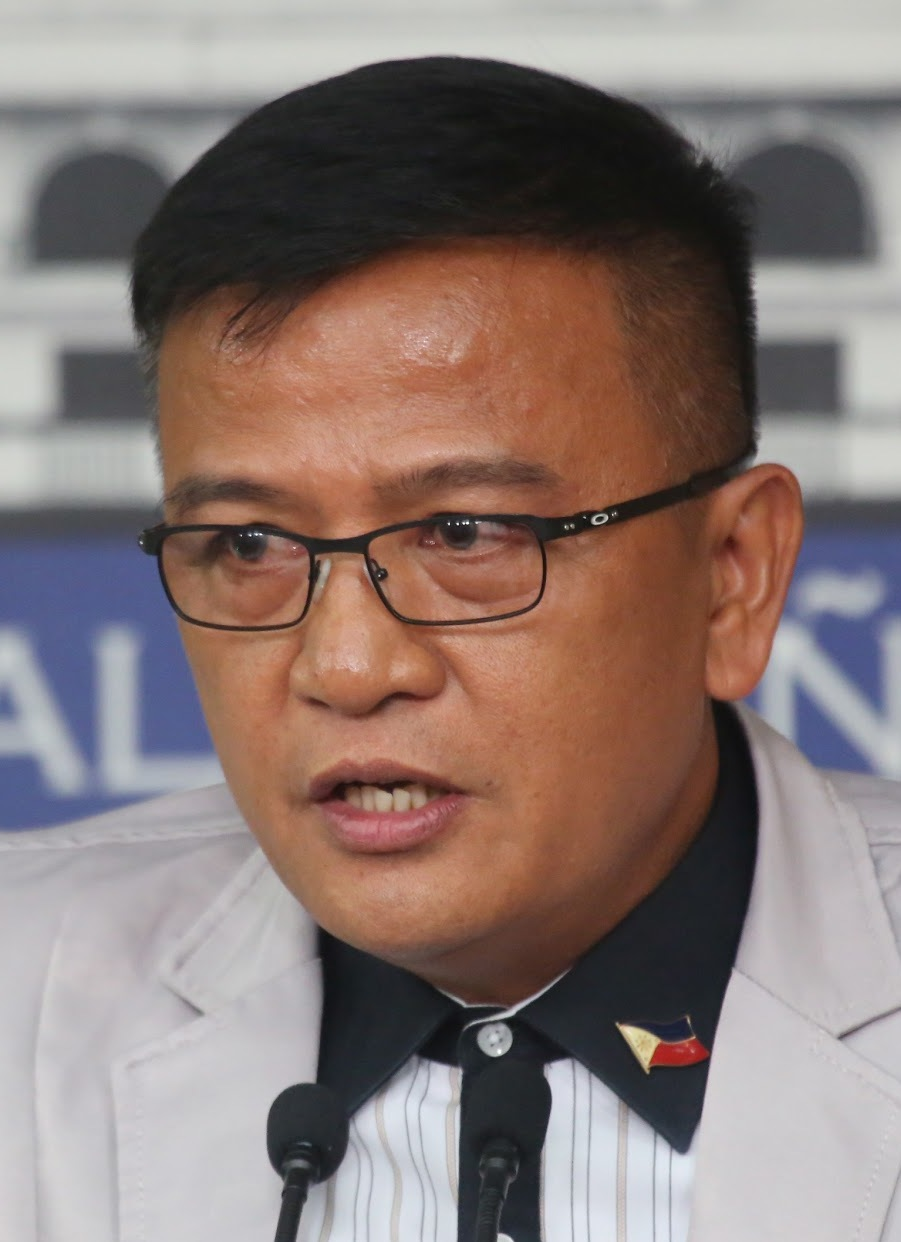
- Cpt. Nicanor E. Faeldon, PN(M)

Director-General of the Bureau of Corrections
- In office November 21, 2018 – September 5, 2019
- President: Rodrigo Duterte
- Preceded by: Ronald dela Rosa
- Succeeded by: Gerald Bantag

Commissioner of the Bureau of Customs
- In office June 30, 2016 – August 21, 2017
- President: Rodrigo Duterte
- Preceded by: Alberto Lina
- Succeeded by: Isidro Lapeña

Personal details
- Born: Nicanor Escalona Faeldon; July 29, 1965 (age 61) Batanes, Philippines
- Education: National University
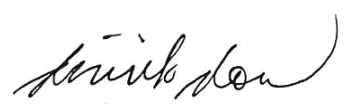
- Signature
- Website: www.nicanorfaeldon.com

Military service
- Allegiance: Philippines
- Branch/service: Philippine Navy ∟ Marine Corps
- Years of service: 1989–2003
- Rank: Captain

Nicanor Escalona Faeldon Sr. (Tagalog pronunciation: [faʔelˈdɔn]; born July 29, 1965) is a Filipino former Marine who served as the director-general of the Bureau of Corrections under the Duterte administration from November 21, 2018, until he was fired in September 2019. He served as Commissioner of the Bureau of Customs from June 30, 2016, to August 21, 2017. He was a captain in the Philippine Marines who gained national and international attention when he participated as one of the alleged leaders of the incident known as the Oakwood mutiny in 2003.

== Early life and education ==
Faeldon was born in Batanes province on July 29, 1965. He graduated from the National University in Manila with a Bachelor of Arts degree, majoring in political science. At National University he became a member of the Tau Gamma Phi fraternity.

== Military career ==
Faeldon started his military career in June 1989 as a 3rd Class Trainee of the Naval Combat Engineer Brigade (formerly Naval Construction Brigade or Seabees). He was called to active duty (CAD) as a commissioned officer in the Philippine Marine Corps in 1992. Since then he has been awarded a Gold Cross Medal, three Military Merit Medals (MMM), five Military Commendation Medals (MCM), a Wounded Personnel Medal, and Luzon, Visayas and Mindanao campaign medals.

- Gold Cross Medal
- Bronze Cross Medal
- Wounded Personnel Medal
- 3 Military Merits
- 5 Military Commendation Medals
- Anti-dissidence Campaign Medal
- Luzon Anti-Dissidence Campaign Medal
- Visayas Anti-Dissidence Campaign Medal
- Mindanao Anti-Dissidence Campaign Medal
- AFP Parachutist Badge

=== Oakwood mutiny ===
On July 27, 2003, a group of 321 men of various branches of the Philippine military took control of the Oakwood serviced apartments in Makati. Led by Captains Gerardo Gambala, Milo Maestrecampo, Nicanor Faeldon and Lt(sg) Antonio Trillanes IV, they denounced corruption and politicization in the military, alleging, among others, that military officials had been selling arms and ammunition to insurgents and that the government had no intention of resolving existing armed conflicts to allow the corrupt practices to continue. After government negotiators promised to prosecute only the leaders of the alleged mutiny, the incident ended without bloodshed eighteen hours later. However, despite the terms of surrender, all participants, including enlisted men, were taken into custody and charged.

==== Escape ====
On December 14, 2005, Cpt. Faeldon escaped from custody and heavy guard after attending a hearing on the coup d'état case filed against him and twenty-nine others accused. He later issued a statement saying that after keeping his silence for over two years, he was leaving to "join the fight for a credible government." He stated that he knew that such actions would bear no benefit for himself, that he would never run for public office, while noting that the events since 2003 have proven him right. Shortly after his escape, four others of his co-accused, led by Army 1Lt. Lawrence San Juan also escaped from their detention in Fort Bonifacio, Makati.

While outside, Cpt. Faeldon called for civil disobedience and set up an organization, Pilipino.org. His website, www.pilipino.org.ph, received over a million hits in the days following his escape. He also had himself videotaped and photographed inside various military camps throughout the Philippines posting the videos and pictures on his website, saying that:

Unless those corrupt generals man the gates themselves, no one can stop me from going in and out of these camps. The enlisted men and officers of the military and the police who remain loyal to the people will not turn me in.

He was recaptured on January 27, 2006, in Mandaluyong, with Cpt. Candelaria Rivas (JAGS), a military lawyer with the Judge Advocate General's Office, who was prosecuting his and the other alleged mutineers' court martial case.

He was placed in solitary confinement in the detention center of the Intelligence Service Armed Forces of the Philippines, in Camp Aguinaldo. His salary was also suspended indefinitely. Thereafter, he was transferred to the Philippine Marine Brig in Fort Bonifacio where he remained incarcerated until the November 29, 2007 incident.

==== No plea bargain ====
Cpt. Faeldon leaving a hearing at the Judge Advocate General's Office in Camp Aguinaldo, Quezon City.

After several of his co-accused pleaded guilty to the offense of violation of Articles of War 97 or conduct unbecoming an officer and a gentleman, Cpt. Faeldon released a statement explaining why he in turn would not plea bargain to any of the offenses he was charged with in connection with the alleged mutiny and that he was continuing the fight they began at Oakwood. In the said statement, he declared that he respects the decision of his co-accused to plead guilty but that he was asserting that nothing had changed since he and his co-accused took over Oakwood four years earlier. He cited rampant corruption and increasing politization in the military. He stated that a plea bargain would be a ratification of Gloria Macapagal Arroyo's doubtful legitimacy. He also indicated that when he went to Oakwood he was well aware that his career or his life could have ended there. He closes his statement by saying:

If this refusal to bargain means a prison term or the loss of my life, I am prepared, now, as much as I was four years ago, to pay the price for telling the truth.

=== Manila Peninsula incident ===
The Manila Peninsula incident occurred on November 29, 2007, at The Peninsula Manila (colloquially, Manila Peninsula Hotel), Makati, Philippines. Detained Senator Antonio Trillanes IV, Brigadier General Danilo D. Lim, and 25 other Magdalo officers walked out of their trial and marched through the streets of Makati, called for the ousting of President Gloria Macapagal Arroyo, and seized the second floor of the Manila Peninsula Hotel along Ayala Avenue. Former Vice-President Teofisto Guingona, Jr. also joined the march to the hotel, as well as some of the soldiers from the Armed Forces of the Philippines.

Trillanes and Lim surrendered to government forces several hours after the beginning of the mutiny, after the military armored personnel carrier barged into the lobby of the hotel. Trillanes and the mutineers were arrested while several journalists that covered the event were handcuffed and detained. The journalists were subsequently released.

Faeldon and three Magdalo officers are still missing. Two days later, the government set a one million Philippine peso (Php 1,000,000.00) reward for any information leading to his re-arrest.

Shortly after the PNP announced the release of Wanted posters for Faeldon and other alleged "Magdalo soldiers" a statement went up on the pilipino.org website questioning the reward and the wanted poster, which was to be released before the arrest warrant was issued by the Regional Trial Court only after the December 11 hearing.

== Surrender and amnesty ==
On 7 July 2010, Faeldon surrendered to military authorities but was later amnestied by President Benigno Aquino III.

== Bureau of Customs ==
On May 31, 2016, it was announced that Faeldon will be joining the administration of President Rodrigo Duterte as Commissioner of the Bureau of Customs. He took office on June 30, 2016, succeeding Alberto D. Lina.

Faeldon is facing graft charges before the Sandiganbayan anti-graft court for allowing PHP34.04 million worth of rice to be released to importer Cebu Lite Trading Incorporated without permits.

== Bureau of Corrections ==
Faeldon was appointed as Director-General of the Bureau of Corrections in November 2018. He stepped down on 5 September 2019 after being fired by President Rodrigo Duterte amid public outrage over the early release under the Good Conduct Time Allowance (GCTA) law of thousands of prison convicts. The most controversial of which was when the media got a copy of a release order signed by Faeldon for former Calauan mayor Antonio Sanchez, who had been sentenced to seven life terms in 1999 for the rape and murder of University of the Philippines student Eileen Sarmenta and her friend Allan Gomez. Sanchez's release was subsequently revoked.

== Political stances and activity ==
=== Pilipino.org ===
Faeldon set up the website "Pilipino.org" which aims to "organize Filipinos for the purpose of creating greater national consciousness to achieve nationhood".

On November 30, 2007, the website, which had drawn a million hits during Faeldon's escape in 2005, was allegedly dismantled by the government. However, by 10 December the site was back with statements in defense of Faeldon.

=== Spratly islands dispute ===
Faeldon organized the "Kalayaan Atin Ito" a youth-led activity whose participants went to Spratlys to assert the Philippines' sovereign claims over the contested region in the South China Sea.

=== Opposition to JPEPA ===
In July 2007 he filed a criminal case against Philippine officials who negotiated the Japan-Philippines Economic Partnership Agreement, a bi-lateral trade agreement opposed by citizen's groups who claimed that the said agreement would allow the importation of toxic wastes into the country. In his complaint he states that the negotiators of the treaty compromised Philippine interests in favor of Japan. He again reiterated that he does not intend to run for public office.

== Personal life ==
Faeldon is married to Jelina Maree Magsuci, a lawyer and city councilor of Calapan, Oriental Mindoro who also served as his legal counsel in his graft case until the Sandiganbayan banned her from doing so in 2024, citing conflict of interest with her political position.

== See also ==
- Oakwood Mutiny
- 2006 state of emergency in the Philippines
- Hello Garci scandal
