= Dangerous Drugs Board =

Philippine government agency

Government agency overview
- Formed: November 14, 1971
- Jurisdiction: Philippine Government
- Headquarters: Diliman, Quezon City, Metro Manila
- Employees: 101 (2024)
- Government agency executive: Sec. Oscar F. Valenzuela, Chairman
- Parent department: Office of the President of the Philippines
- Website: www.ddb.gov.ph

The Dangerous Drugs Board (DDB; Filipino: Lupon sa Mapanganib na Droga) is a government agency tasked with creating policies in dealing with illegal drugs in the Philippines.

== Background ==
At the time when the Republic Act 6425, also known as the Dangerous Drugs Act of 1972, was approved on March 30, 1972, there were 20,000 drug users and marijuana was the most preferred illegal drug among users in the country. The board was established on November 14, 1972, under the Office of the President after the proclamation of Martial Law in the country by then President Ferdinand Marcos.

The DDB was mandated to be the policy-making and coordinating agency as well as the national clearing house on all matters pertaining to law enforcement and control of dangerous drugs; treatment and rehabilitation of drug dependents; drug abuse prevention, training and information; research and statistics on the drug problem and the training of personnel engaged in these activities.

== Composition ==
Seven national agencies in the country initially formed part of the Dangerous Drugs Board. These are the Department of Health, Department of Social Service and Development (now Department of Social Welfare and Development), Department of Education, Culture and Sports (now Department of Education), Department of Justice, Department of National Defense, Department of Finance and the National Bureau of Investigation.

The membership of the board was expanded through the Republic Act 9165. Through the law the Department of the Interior and Local Government, Department of Labor and Employment, Department of Foreign Affairs, Commission on Higher Education, National Youth Commission, and the Philippine Drug Enforcement Agency which was recently established at the time became members of the DDB.

=== Chairmen ===
List of Chairmen
#	Chairman	Term	
#	Chairman	From	To
1	Clemente Gatmaitan	1972	1979
2	Enrique Manjarres Garcia	1979	1981
3	Jesus Azurin	1981	1986
4	Alfredo Bengzon	1986	1992
5	Antonio Periquet	1992	
6	Juan Flavier	1992	1995
7	Jaime Galvez-Tan	1995	
8	Hilarion Ramiro	1995	1996
9	Carmencita Reodica	1996	
10	Teofisto Guingona	1996	January 1998
11	Silvestre Bello III	February 1998	June 1998
12	Serafin R. Cuevas	July 1998	February 2000
13	Artemio Tuquero	February 2000	January 2001
14	Hernando Perez	January 2001	January 2003
15	Joey Lina	July 2002	July 2004
16	Angelo Reyes	September 2004	April 2006
17	Anselmo Avenido Jr.	September 2006	June 2008
18	Vicente Sotto III	June 2008	November 2009
19	Antonio Villar Jr.	January 2010	January 2016
20	Felipe Rojas Jr.	March 2016	August 2016
21	Benjamin Reyes	August 2016	July 2017
22	Dionisio Santiago	July 2017	November 2017
23	Catalino Cuy	January 2018	February 2025
24	Oscar Valenzuela	February 2025	present
