= Maritime Industry Authority =

Government maritime agency in Philippines

Coordinates: 14.5870°N 120.9727°E

- Pangasiwaan sa Industriyang Maritima

Agency overview
- Formed: June 1, 1974; 52 years ago
- Headquarters: Bonifacio Drive, Cor. 20th St, Port Area, Manila
- Employees: 661 (2024)
- Annual budget: ₱765.82 million (2021)
- Agency executives: Atty. Hernani N. Fabia, Administrator; Nannette Z. Villamor-Dinopol, Deputy Administrator for Operations; Sonia Malaluan, Deputy Administrator for Planning
- Parent agency: Department of Transportation
- Website: https://marina.gov.ph/

The Maritime Industry Authority (MARINA, locally [mɐˈɾina]; Filipino: Pangasiwaan sa Industriyang Maritima) is an agency of the Philippine government under the Department of Transportation responsible for integrating the development, promotion and regulation of the maritime industry in the Philippines.

== History ==
The Maritime Industry Authority (MARINA) was created on June 1, 1974 with the issuance of Presidential Decree No. 474 to integrate the development, promotion, and regulation of the maritime industry in the country. It was originally placed under the Office of the President. With the creation of the Ministry (now, Department) of Transportation and Communications (DOTC) by virtue of Executive Order No. 546, MARINA was attached to the DOTC for policy and program coordination on July 23, 1979.

The regulatory function of the MARINA was increased with the issuance of Executive Order No. 1011 which abolished the Board of Transportation and transferred the quasi-judicial functions pertaining to water transportation to the MARINA.

On January 30, 1987, Executive Order No. 125 (amended by EO 125-A) was issued reorganizing the Department of Transportation and Communications. The powers and functions of the department and the agencies under its umbrella were defined, further increasing MARINA's responsibility to the industry. One of those responsibilities include regulating the operations of shipping vessels in terms of safety.

== Sectoral coverages ==
MARINA has jurisdiction over the development, promotion and regulation of all enterprises engaged in the business of designing, constructing, manufacturing, acquiring, operating, supplying, repairing, and/or maintaining vessels, or component parts thereof, of managing and/or operating shipping lines, shipyards, drydocks, marine railways, marine repair ships, shipping and freight forwarding agencies and similar enterprises.

The agency also has authority to investigate and penalize foreign shipping vessels entering the territorial waters of the Philippines that are performing "suspicious activities."

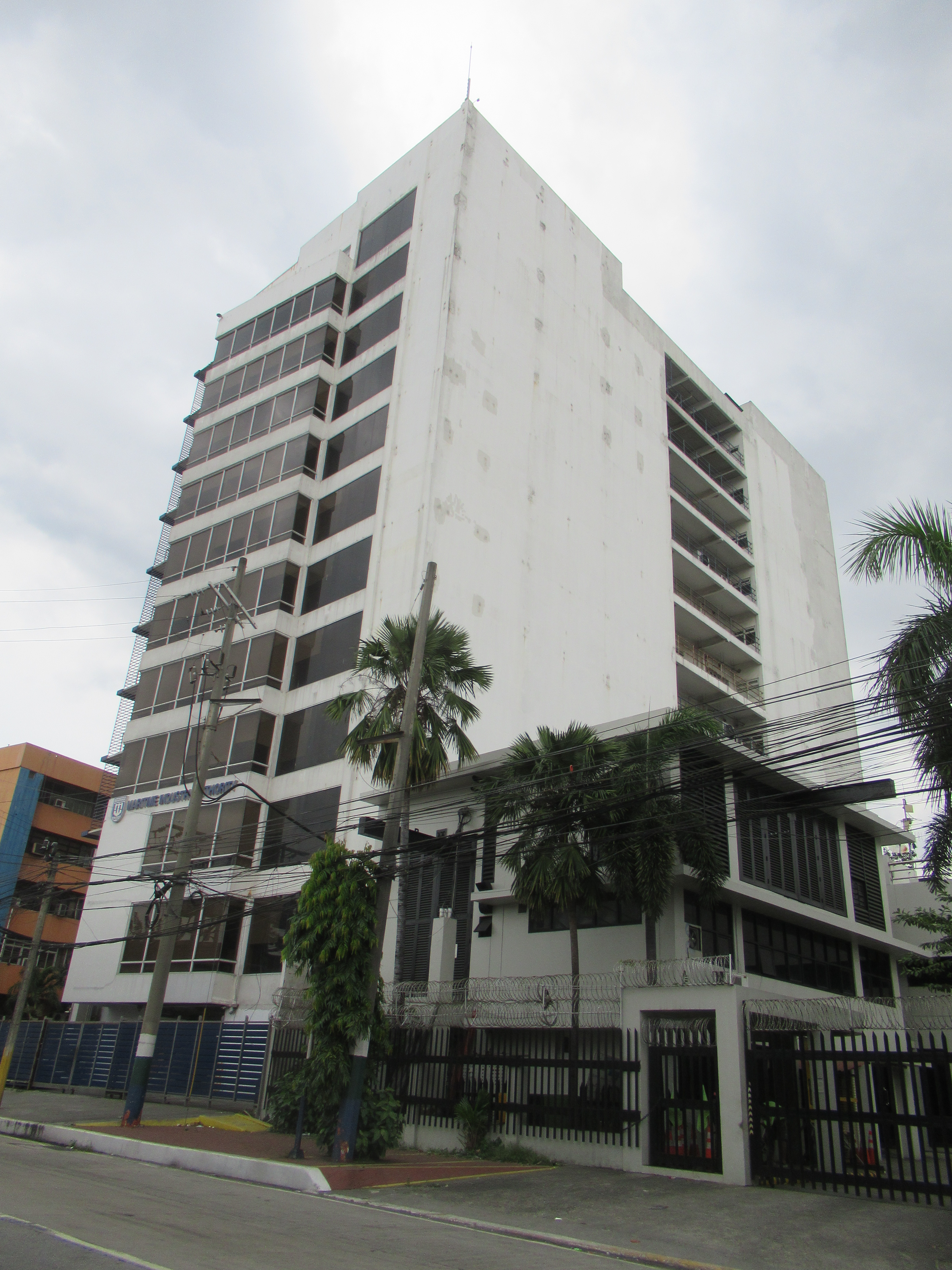
MARINA Headquarters - Port Area, Manila

== See also ==
- Department of Transportation
- List of shipping companies in the Philippines
