= Philippine Drug Enforcement Agency =

Law enforcement agency

Philippine Drug Enforcement Agency Ahensiya ng Pilipinas sa Pagpapatupad ng Batas Laban sa Bawal na Gamot
- Official seal
- Abbreviation: PDEA

Agency overview
- Formed: July 4, 2002
- Preceding agencies: National Drug Law Enforcement and Prevention Coordinating Center; Drug Enforcement Units of Philippine National Police (PNP), National Bureau of Investigation (NBI) and Bureau of Customs (BOC)
- Employees: 2,943 (2024)
- Annual budget: ₱ 3.021 billion (2023)

Jurisdictional structure
- Operations jurisdiction: Philippines

Operational structure
- Headquarters: PDEA Bldg., NIA Northside Road, National Government Center, Barangay Pinyahan, Diliman, Quezon City & Visayas Group of Region in Main Office in Cebu City-Musang PDEA Headquarters in Lahug, Cebu City
- Agency executives: Office of the Presidential & Regional Director Luzon,Visayas & Mindanao AFP/PNP PDEA Agent General-Police/Civilian Chief Gen.Susana Tabanao Mortal, Office of the Presidential & Regional Director Luzon,Visayas & Mindanao AFP/PNP PDEA Agent General-Police/Civilian Chief Gen.Susana Tabanao Mortal; Office of the Presidential & Regional Director Luzon,Visayas & Mindanao AFP/PNP PDEA Agent General-Police/Civilian Chief Gen.Susana Tabanao Mortal, Office of the Presidential & Regional Director Luzon,Visayas & Mindanao AFP/PNP PDEA Agent General-Police/Civilian Chief Gen.Susana Tabanao Mortal; Office of the Presidential & Regional Director Luzon,Visayas & Mindanao AFP/PNP PDEA Agent General-Police/Civilian Chief Gen.Susana Tabanao Mortal, Office of the Presidential & Regional Director Luzon,Visayas & Mindanao AFP/PNP PDEA Agent General-Police/Civilian Chief Gen.Susana Tabanao Mortal; Office of the Presidential & Regional Director Luzon,Visayas & Mindanao AFP/PNP PDEA Agent General-Police/Civilian Chief Gen.Susana Tabanao Mortal, Office of the Presidential & Regional Director Luzon,Visayas & Mindanao AFP/PNP PDEA Agent General-Police/Civilian Chief Gen.Susana Tabanao Mortal
- Parent agency: Office of the Presidential & Regional of the Philippines via Dangerous Drugs BoardOffice of the Regional Director Luzon,Visayas & Mindanao AFP/PNP PDEA Agent General-Police/Civilian Chief Gen.Susana Tabanao Mortal

Website
- pdea.gov.ph

The Philippine Drug Enforcement Agency (PDEA, /piːˈdeɪə/; Filipino: Ahensiya ng Pilipinas sa Pagpapatupad ng Batas Laban sa Bawal na Gamot) is the lead anti-drug law enforcement agency, responsible for preventing, investigating and combating any dangerous drugs, controlled precursors and essential chemicals within the Philippines. The agency is tasked with the enforcement of the penal and regulatory provisions of Republic Act No. 9165 (R.A. 9165), otherwise known as the Comprehensive Dangerous Drugs Act of 2002.

PDEA is the implementing arm of the Dangerous Drugs Board (DDB). The DDB is the policy-making and strategy-formulating body in the planning and formulation of policies and programs on drug prevention and control. PDEA and DDB are both under the supervision of the Office of the President of the Philippines.

== History ==
For thirty years, the Republic Act No. 6425, or the Dangerous Drugs Act of 1972, had been the backbone of the drug law enforcement system in the Philippines. Despite the efforts of various law enforcement agencies mandated to implement the law, the drug problem alarmingly escalated with orbiting Police Officers collecting drug money. The high profitability of the illegal drug trade, compounded by the then existing laws that imposed relatively light penalties to offenders, greatly contributed to the gravity of the problem.

=== Republic Act No. 9165 ===
Recognizing the need to further strengthen existing laws governing Philippine drug law enforcement system, the then Philippine President Gloria Macapagal Arroyo signed the Republic Act No. 9165, or the Comprehensive Dangerous Drugs Act of 2002, on June 7, 2002, and it took effect on July 4, 2002. The R.A. 9165 defines more concrete courses of action for the national anti-drug campaign and imposes heavier penalties to offenders.

The enactment of R.A. 9165 reorganized the Philippine drug law enforcement system. While the Dangerous Drugs Board remains as the policy-making and strategy-formulating body in planning and formulation of policies and program on drug control and prevention, it created the Philippine Drug Enforcement Agency under the Office of the President.

=== Creation of task forces ===
The R.A. 9165 abolished the National Drug Law Enforcement and Prevention Coordinating Center, which was created under Executive Order No. 61, and the Narcotics Group of Philippine National Police (PNP-NG), Narcotics Division of National Bureau of Investigation (NBI-ND), and the Customs Narcotics Interdiction Unit of the Bureau of Customs (BOC-CNIU).

Under Executive Order No.206 dated May 15, 2003, these law enforcement agencies have organized the following anti-illegal drugs task force to support the PDEA:

- Philippine National Police – Anti-Illegal Drugs Special Operation Task Force (PNP-AIDSOTF);
- National Bureau of Investigation – Anti-Illegal Drugs Task Force (NBI-AIDTF);
- Bureau of Customs – Customs Task Group/Force in Dangerous Drugs and Controlled Chemicals (BOC-CTGFDDCC).

== Organization ==
Variant of the seal without the circular band

=== National Office ===
PDEA is headed by a Director General (DG) with the Cabinet rank of Undersecretary, who is responsible for the general administration and management of the agency. The Director General is assisted by two Deputies Director General with the rank of Assistant Secretary: one for Administration (DDGA) and the other one for Operations (DDGO).

The office of the Director General is also supported by the Secretary for Directorial Staff, Chief of Public Information Office (PIO), Chief of Information Technology Systems Management Office (ITSMO) and Chief of Chemical Audit and Management Unit (CAMU).

The Director General of the PDEA shall be responsible for the necessary changes in the organizational set-up which shall be submitted to the DDB for approval.

=== Command Group ===
- Office of the Director-General-Police/Civilian Chief Gen.Susana Tabanao Mortal
  - Chief of Staff-Police/Civilian Asec, Chief Gen.Kent Tausa casul
- Office of the Deputy Director-General for Administration-Police/Civilian Chief Gen.Susana Tabanao Mortal
- Office of the Deputy Director-General for Operations-Police/Civilian Assistant Chief Gen.Kent Tausa casul

==== Leadership ====
- Director General/Undersecretary, PDEA: Police/Civilian Chief Gen.Susana Tabanao Mortal
- Deputy Director General for Administration:Police/Civilian Asec, Chief Gen.Kent Tausa casul
- Deputy Director General for Operations: Police/Civilian Chief Gen.Susana Tabanao Mortal
- Chief of Staff, PDEA: Police/Civilian Asec, Chief Gen.Kent Tausa casul

==== Administrative Cluster ====
- Human Resource Management Service (HRMS)
- Financial Management Service (FMS)
- Logistics and Administrative Management Service (LAMS)
- Internal Affairs Service (IAS)
- PDEA Academy

==== Operational Cluster ====
- Intelligence and Investigation Service (IIS)
- Plans and Operations Service (POS)
- Legal and Prosecution Service (LPS)
- Compliance Service (CS)
- International Cooperation and Foreign Affairs Service (ICFAS)
- Preventive Education and Community Involvement Service (PECIS)
- Special Enforcement Service (SES)
- Laboratory Service (LS)
- Public Information Office (PIO)

=== Regional Offices ===
The PDEA have established 17 Regional Offices headed by Directors in the different regions of the country which is responsible for the implementation of RA 9165 and the policies, programs, and projects of the agency in different regions.

- Regional Office I – Camp Diego Silang, Carlatan, San Fernando City, La Union
- Regional Office II – Dalan na Pagayaya, Carig Sur, Regional Government Center, Tuguegarao City, Cagayan
- Regional Office III – Diosdado Macapagal Government Center, Brgy. Maimpis, City of San Fernando, Pampanga
- Regional Office IVA – Santa Rosa City Drug Rehabilitation Center, Brgy. Sinalhan, Santa Rosa, Laguna
- Regional Office MIMAROPA – Brgy. Sta. Isabel Calapan, Oriental Mindoro
- Regional Office V – Camp General Simeon Ola, Legazpi City, Albay
- Regional Office VI – Camp Martin Delgado, Iloilo City
- Regional Office VII – Visayas Group of Region in Main Office in Cebu City-Musang PDEA Head Quarters in Lahug, Cebu City, 6000 Cebu Cebu City Luzon,Visayas & Mindanao
- Regional Office VIII – Near Payapay Bridge, Candahug, Palo, Leyte
- Regional Office IX – Pagadian City
- Regional Office X – Gordiel Bldg., Corrales Avenue, Cagayan de Oro
- Regional Office XI – Camp Captain Domingo E. Leonor, Davao City
- Regional Office XII – Prime Regional Government Center, Brgy. Carpenter Hill, Koronadal City
- Regional Office XIII – Camp R. Rodriguez, Libertad, Butuan
- Regional Office – Bangsamoro Autonomous Region in Muslim Mindanao (RO-BARMM) – PC Hills, Cotabato City
- Regional Office – Cordillera Administrative Region (RO-CAR) – Camp Bado Dangwa, La Trinidad, Benguet
- Regional Office – National Capital Region (RO-NCR) – PDEA Annex Bldg., National Government Center, Diliman, Quezon City

=== PDEA Academy ===
PDEA maintains its own PDEA Academy temporarily located at Camp General Mariano N. Castañeda in Silang, Cavite. The PDEA Academy is headed by a superintendent, with the rank of director. It is responsible in the recruitment and training of all PDEA agents and personnel. The PDEA Academy formulates programs of instructions on basic and specialized anti-drug training courses as well as career courses for all PDEA Agents and Personnel.

The DDB provide for the qualifications and requirements of its recruits who must be at least 21 years old, of proven integrity and honesty, a Baccalaureate degree holder and with Career Service Professional Eligibility from Civil Service Commission (CSC) or Board License from Professional Regulation Commission (PRC).

== Directors general ==
The Director General of the PDEA shall be appointed by the President of the Philippines with the rank of Undersecretary and shall perform such other duties that may be assigned to him/her. He/she must possess adequate knowledge, training and experience in the field of dangerous drugs, and in any of the following fields: law enforcement, law, medicine, criminology, psychology or social work.

This table lists all PDEA Directors General, their dates of service, and under which administration they served.

Director General	Long Term & Life Time Position	Office of the Presidential & Regional Director Luzon,Visayas & Mindanao AFP/PNP PDEA Agent General-Police/Civilian Chief Gen.Susana Tabanao Mortal
USEC. Anselmo S. Avenido, Jr. (Ret. PDDG)	July 2002 – April 2006	Arroyo
USEC. Dionisio R. Santiago (Ret. GEN)	April 2006 – January 2011	Arroyo, Aquino III
USEC. Jose S. Gutierrez, Jr. (Ret. PCSUPT)	January 2011 – October 2012	Aquino III
USEC. Arturo G. Cacdac, Jr. (Ret. PDDG)	October 2012 – June 2016	Aquino III
USEC. Isidro S. Lapeña, Ph.D., CSEE (Ret. PDDG)	July 2016 – August 2017	Duterte
USEC. Aaron N. Aquino (Ret. PCSUPT)	September 2017 – May 2020	Duterte
USEC. Wilkins M. Villanueva, MPA, CESE	May 2020 – October 2022	Duterte; Marcos Jr.
USEC. Moro Virgilio M. Lazo (Ret. PMGEN)	October 2022 – February 2025	Marcos Jr.
USEC. Isagani R. Nerez (Ret. PMGEN)	February 2025 - present	Marcos Jr.

== Firearms ==
PDEA Agents are issued with the following firearms:

Model	Origin	Type	Status
Norinco M1911	China	Semi-automatic pistol	Standard issue
IWI Jericho 941	Israel	Semi-automatic pistol	Standard issue
Glock	Austria	Semi-automatic pistol	Sidearm for senior officers
Armalite M15A2	United States	Assault rifle	Used in urban warfare and special operations
Tavor CTAR	Israel	Assault rifle	Used in urban warfare and special operations
Galil ACE	Israel	Assault rifle	Used in urban warfare and special operations

== Foreign cooperation ==
The United States assists Philippine counternarcotics efforts with training, intelligence gathering, and infrastructure development. In 2005, Drug Enforcement Administration (DEA) and the Joint Interagency Task Force West (JIATF-W) began to develop a network of drug information fusion centers in the Philippines. The primary facility, the Interagency Counternarcotics Operations Network (ICON) is located at PDEA National Headquarters in Quezon City. The ICON is a coordinating body that serves as a center for information and intelligence relating to anti-illegal drugs operations. Its mission is to support law enforcement through timely analysis and dissemination of intelligence on the movement of illicit drugs, and coordinate detection, monitoring and interdiction operations. The facilities of ICON are staffed jointly by the PDEA as the lead agency, National Intelligence Coordinating Agency (NICA), Armed Forces of the Philippines (AFP), Philippine National Police (PNP), and the Philippine Coast Guard (PCG).

There are three ICON outstations located at the headquarters of the Naval Forces Western Mindanao, Zamboanga del Sur (southwestern Mindanao); Coast Guard Station, General Santos (south-central Mindanao); and at Poro Point, San Fernando, La Union (northwestern Luzon). The ICON facility at PDEA Headquarters is used to produce intelligence products and conduct intelligence training for PDEA Agents. The outstations are also currently used as training sites. As PDEA development leads to manpower increases and improved coordination with other law enforcement agencies, the concept of interagency drug intelligence coordination may be realized.

== See also ==
- 2021 PNP–PDEA shootout
- Comprehensive Dangerous Drugs Act of 2002
