= Federalism and Rodrigo Duterte =

Philippine president's views on devolution

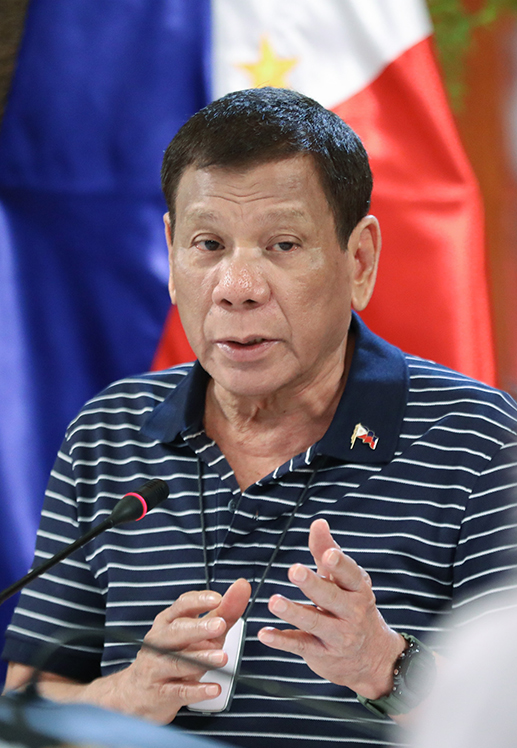
Rodrigo Duterte served as the President of the Philippines from 2016 to 2022, promoting his style of mandating federal equality in the state.

Federalism was one of the main campaign promises of Rodrigo Duterte when he ran for President of the Philippines in 2016. His administration pursued a proposal which would shift the Philippines from being under a unitary form of government to a federal one.

By 2021, efforts to introduce a federal form of government in the Philippines has halted. Among the factors include lack of support from members of the Congress, lack of public awareness on federalism, and public skepticism on charter change which is a prerequisite for federalism.

== Background ==
One of Rodrigo Duterte's campaign promises when he ran for president in the 2016 Philippine national elections was the adoption of a federal form of government for the Philippines. He had promised to redistribute power and wealth to the rural areas through the adoption of federalism. He also had advance federalism as a solution to the Moro conflict insisting in a campaign promise that "nothing short will bring peace to Mindanao."

In Duterte's first State of the Nation Address in 2016, he directed the Department of the Interior and Local Government to launch a nationwide information campaign to promote the benefits of federalism.

President Rodrigo Duterte issued Executive Order No. 10 which mandates for the creation of a 25-member Consultative Committee (ConCom) on December 7, 2016 for the review of the 1987 Constitution. Duterte appointed the first 22 members of the committee on January 24, 2018. The ConCom submitted its first federal constitution draft on July 9, 2018. The draft underwent several changes with the newer versions criticized; such as for omitting provisions which serves as safeguard against political dynasties and turncoatism, provisions on federated regions, and the removal of the position of Vice President.

In mid-2018, Communications Assistant Secretary Mocha Uson was criticized by legislators and the public for the Pepederalismo vlog that featured blogger Drew Olivar, where Olivar performed a federalism jingle while gesturing to his crotch and chest. A member of the Cabinet said the video "poured very cold water on the federalism initiative". The lack of awareness on federalism is attributed to the lack of support for the campaign by the public.

In 2019, Duterte proposed the amendment of the Constitution as an alternative if his administration campaign for federalism fails to gain enough traction. In August 2020, Presidential spokesperson Harry Roque says that Duterte's administration is still pursuing the shift to federalism and is considering three options to accomplish this; by amending the 1987 Constitution through Constitutional Convention (Con-Con), Constituent Assembly (Con-Ass), or people's initiative.

In a democracy summit hosted by US President Joe Biden in December 2021, Duterte stated that his bid for federalism has failed citing failure to secure sufficient support from the Congress.

== Proposals ==
=== Subdivisions ===
There are several proposals made in regards to the number of subdivisions of a Federal Philippines. This includes:

- In 2017, then-House Speaker Pantaleon Alvarez's vision for a federal Philippines called for 14 states: 7 in Luzon, 2 in Visayas and 5 in Mindanao. He also proposed that the capital of the Philippines under a federal government should be somewhere in Negros Island saying that it would be accessible to all people from the three island groups while he added that the state's territory does not have to be contiguous.
- The Sub-Committee 1 of the House of Representatives Committee on Constitutional Amendments in 2018 proposed that a federal Philippines would comprise five states: Luzon, Visayas, Mindanao, Bangsamoro and Metro Manila. Each states to be led by a premiere as its executive head will have a State Assembly according to the proposal.
- In February 2018, the League of Provinces of the Philippines (LPP), whose members are the 81 provincial governors, gave its support to the country's shift to federalism, but stated that the 81 existing provinces should be converted into "independent states", instead of regional lumping.
- On April 25, 2018, the consultative committee (Con-Com), created by President Rodrigo Duterte to propose revisions to the 1987 Constitution, agreed that the starting point for the federalism discussions will be the establishment of 17 federated regions and the National Capital Region, the proposed federal capital region. The 17 federated regions will be Ilocos, Cagayan Valley, Central Luzon, Calabarzon, Mimaropa, Bicol, Western Visayas, Negros Island, Eastern Visayas, Central Visayas, Zamboanga Peninsula, Northern Mindanao, Davao, Soccksksargen, Caraga, Cordillera Administrative Region and Autonomous Region in Muslim Mindanao.

On July 4, 2018, the Consultative Committee (ConCom) tasked to review the Constitution unanimously approved the draft constitution which would shift the present government form into federalism. Under the approved proposed constitution, the Philippines will be divided into 18 federated regions, where the National Capital Region (which initially was supposed to be a 'capital region') will now be a federated region as well.

It was also suggested that Sabah, a territory administered as a state of Malaysia and is claimed by the Philippines, be made into a federal state of the Philippines.

There was also campaign by local leaders for Negros island and Zambasulta (Zamboanga Peninsula and the Sulu archipelago) for their locale to be made as federal states.

=== Tenure and eligibility for re-election of incumbent officials ===
The draft constitution formulated by the Concom 'allows the president to assume all the necessary powers of government – executive, legislative, and judiciary – to prevent the breakup' of the proposed federated republic, according to Consultative Committee chairman Reynato Puno. On July 6, 2018, it was revealed by ConCom member Julio Teehankee that under the proposed federal constitution, Duterte and Vice President Leni Robredo may run again for president for two consecutive terms or an additional 8 years in office after 2022, paving the way for a possible 14 years in office.

This was met with opposition from some critics, including lawyer and former Solicitor General Florin Hilbay and Albay province Rep. Edcel Lagman. It was feared that the proposed charter would enable an authoritarian regime similar to that of Ferdinand Marcos during the Martial Law era. Hilbay found it suspicious when a copy of the draft charter was leaked by an unknown source, which the commission said was "not final". In a statement, he said that the proposed constitution was “overtly designed to secure, if not coerce, popular anointment of the Consultative Committee's handiwork which was approved without the benefit of prior extensive local consultations.”

Later however, Teehankee stated that he "misspoke" during the interview, saying that the president and vice president are barred from running, and assured that their terms will not be extended, referring to Section 16 of the draft charter, which was not yet available to the public at that time. In contrast, Concom member and former senator Aquilino Pimentel Jr. said, "Theoretically it is true (Duterte can seek re-election), but in Digong's case, I am convinced that he does not want to run again. He has been saying that once it is approved, he will resign."

Rodrigo Duterte has also announced that he had no intention to serve beyond his term, and that he is willing to step down earlier than 2022, in case the shift to federalism pushes through. He then asked the Consultative Committee to include a provision that prevents him from seeking re-election, which was subsequently added by the Concom.

== Public opinion and awareness ==
Generally, Filipinos' stance on a shift to federalism is mixed. These are reflected by nationwide opinion polls conducted by Pulse Asia and Social Weather Stations (SWS). By the end of March 2018, 37% of Filipinos agree, while 29% disagree, when asked if they are in favor of a federal system of government, based on a survey of 1,200 adults aged 18 and above by SWS. Opposition to Charter change (cha-cha) went up from 44 percent in July 2016 to 64 percent in March 2018, and the opposition to federalism went the same way, except by a larger margin—from 33 percent to 66 percent.

Meanwhile, in June 2018, a Pulse Asia poll answered by 1,800 respondents showed 67% being against charter change. However, of those who opposed Charter change, 30 percent said the Constitution should not be amended now, but could be changed sometime in the future, while 37 percent said it should not be changed "now or any other time." Support and awareness for federalism is strongest in Mindanao and within the Filipino Muslim community. Support for federalism was also the strongest in the Bicol Region and Eastern Visayas regions.

The Philippine government cites lack of information as the reason for low public support. Presidential Spokesperson Harry Roque stated that, "For this reason, we cannot expect our people to support an initiative, which they know only little about. There is clearly much work to be done in terms of spreading awareness and knowledge on the aforementioned issue." The Philippine government has repeatedly presented its intention to drive up its effort to educate Filipinos about federalism.

== Position of political parties ==
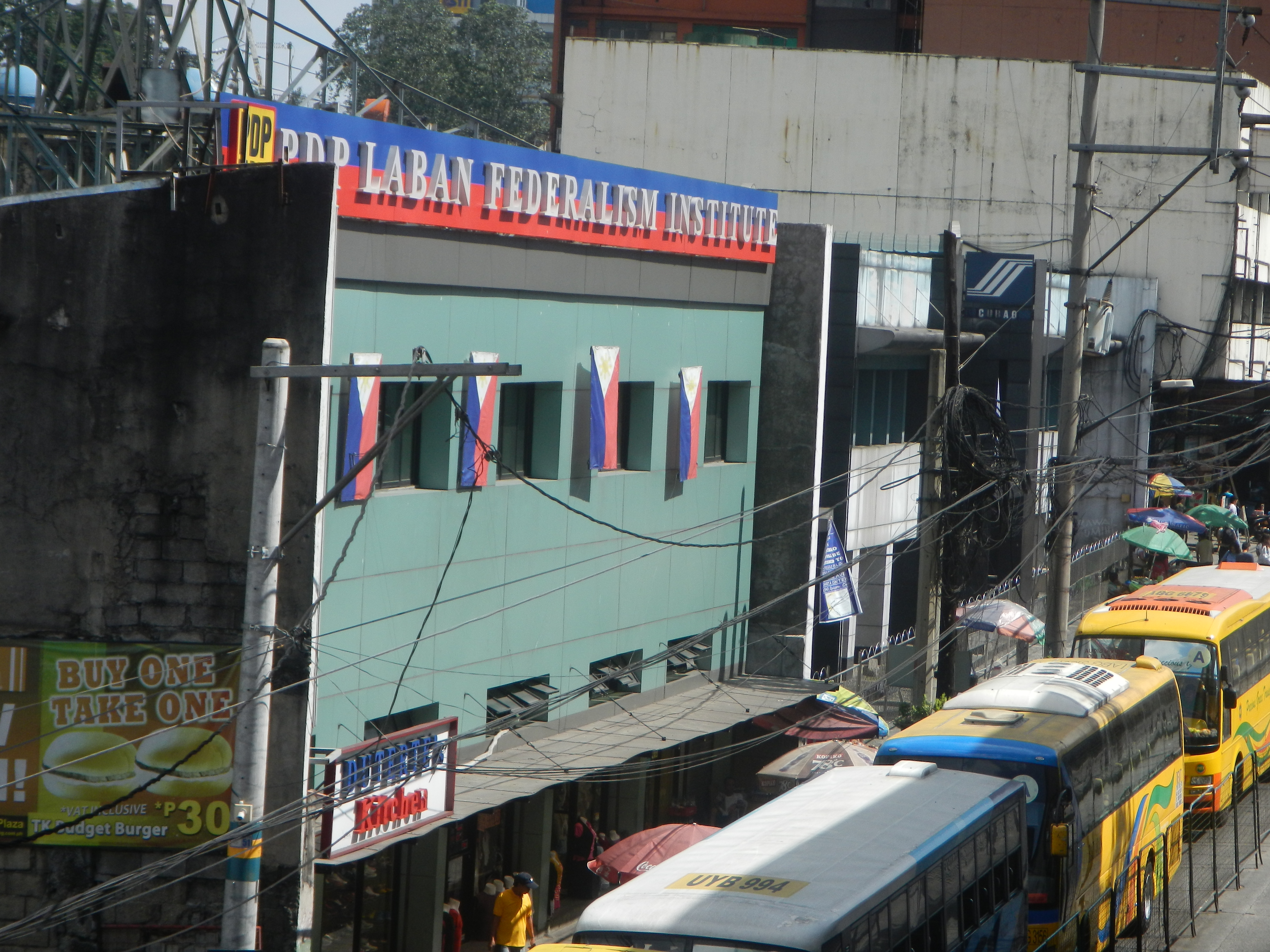
PDP-Laban Federalism Institute in Quezon City.

The political party PDP–Laban is currently the main and strongest advocate of federalism in the Philippines. PDP–Laban currently only allows pro-federalism politicians to be admitted to the party.

In contrast, the opposing Liberal Party is mostly against the movement. Former Vice President Leni Robredo, has expressed her opposition towards charter change and federalism. This sentiment is shared also by various opposition senators and representatives, including Francis Pangilinan and Franklin Drilon Left-wing political parties such as the democratic socialist Akbayan and the more radical Bagong Alyansang Makabayan have also voiced disapproval of charter change. Some members of the Nacionalista Party expressed their disapproval of federalism, including senators Cynthia Villar and Antonio Trillanes.

== Aftermath ==
By December 2021, the campaign for adopting a federal form of government in the Philippines by President Duterte has failed. Duterte cited the lack of support from the Congress. By that time, the Congress is already preoccupied in preparing for the upcoming 2022 elections.

Candidates for the 2022 Philippine presidential election have taken various stances on federalism. The eventual winner of the election, former senator and now current president Bongbong Marcos (who ran under the Partido Federal ng Pilipinas that advocates for federalism), has expressed support for adopting a federal form of government, but cited the difficulty in pushing for charter change. He earlier stated that the country may not be ready for federalism. Former senator Manny Pacquiao included federalism among his campaign promises. He said he would implement a hybrid form of federalism if elected. Meanwhile, Norberto Gonzales on his part prefers to grant autonomy for all regions in the Philippines rather than just Bangsamoro which he insists is a setup different from federalism, although he expressed a vision for a federation comprising states of the ASEAN. Former senators Panfilo Lacson and his vice president candidate Tito Sotto also does not see the push for federalism to be feasible and instead has promised to implement a nationwide budget reform program which they describe as a salient point of federalism. Candidate and labor leader Leody de Guzman opposes federalism and believes that politicians advocating for it is using it as a distraction to avoid discourse on other issues he finds more urgent and important.

== See also ==
- Proposed federal states of the Philippines
