= Separatism in the Philippines =

Movements that seek greater autonomy or wish to secede from the Philippines

The 1987 Constitution of the Philippines allows for two autonomous regions: one in the Cordilleras and one in Muslim Mindanao. Historically, there have been campaigns for greater autonomy in the Cordilleras and for greater autonomy and secession in Mindanao. Cordillera: (currently part of the Cordillera Administrative Region) Muslim Mindanao: Bangsamoro autonomous region Broader traditional Bangsamoro homeland (Mindanao, Sulu, Palawan)

Separatism in the Philippines refers to bids for secession or greater autonomy for certain areas in the Philippines. The scope of the article includes such efforts since the Philippine Revolution, both current and historical. While the Constitution allows for autonomous regions in the Cordilleras and in Muslim Mindanao, it does not provide for secession and provides for the national sovereignty and territorial integrity of the Philippines.

== Secession ==
=== Southern Philippines ===
Several groups have advocated the independence of Mindanao, including the Sulu archipelago and Palawan, from the Philippines. Such armed groups include the Moro National Liberation Front, the Moro Islamic Liberation Front, the Bangsamoro Islamic Freedom Fighters, and the Abu Sayyaf.

==== Separatism during the American colonial period ====
Historically, several states have governed the region, such as the Sulu and Maguindanao sultanates. Other entities such as the Sultanate of Buayan and the Pat a Pangampong ko Ranao emerged. These states have resisted attempts by the Spanish Empire to totally subjugate the area. Nevertheless, the Spanish ceded the whole of the Philippine archipelago in the Treaty of Paris of 1898. The United States later took control over the area, governing it as part of the Insular Government of the Philippine Islands.

Anticipating that the United States would decolonize the islands and grant the Philippines full independence, Moro leaders expressed opposition to their territories being included in a future Philippine state. Such instances of this sentiment being expressed include:

- June 9, 1921 – Petition of the people of the Sulu islands to the United States that it prefers to be part of the United States rather than be included in an independent Philippines
- June 9, 1921, Declaration of Rights and Purposes – Issued by Bangsamoro leaders in Zamboanga regarding the status of Mindanao island, Palawan and the Sulu archipelago
  - Proposal to convert the region to a separate unorganized territory of the United States.
  - If the Philippines granted independence with the Moro territories included in such state; a plebiscite shall be held to determine the status of Mindanao, Palawan, and Sulu islands 50 years after the independence of the Philippines.
- March 18, 1935 Dansalan Declaration – petition by Maranao leaders not to include Mindanao and Sulu if the Philippines was granted independence.

==== Kamlon uprising ====
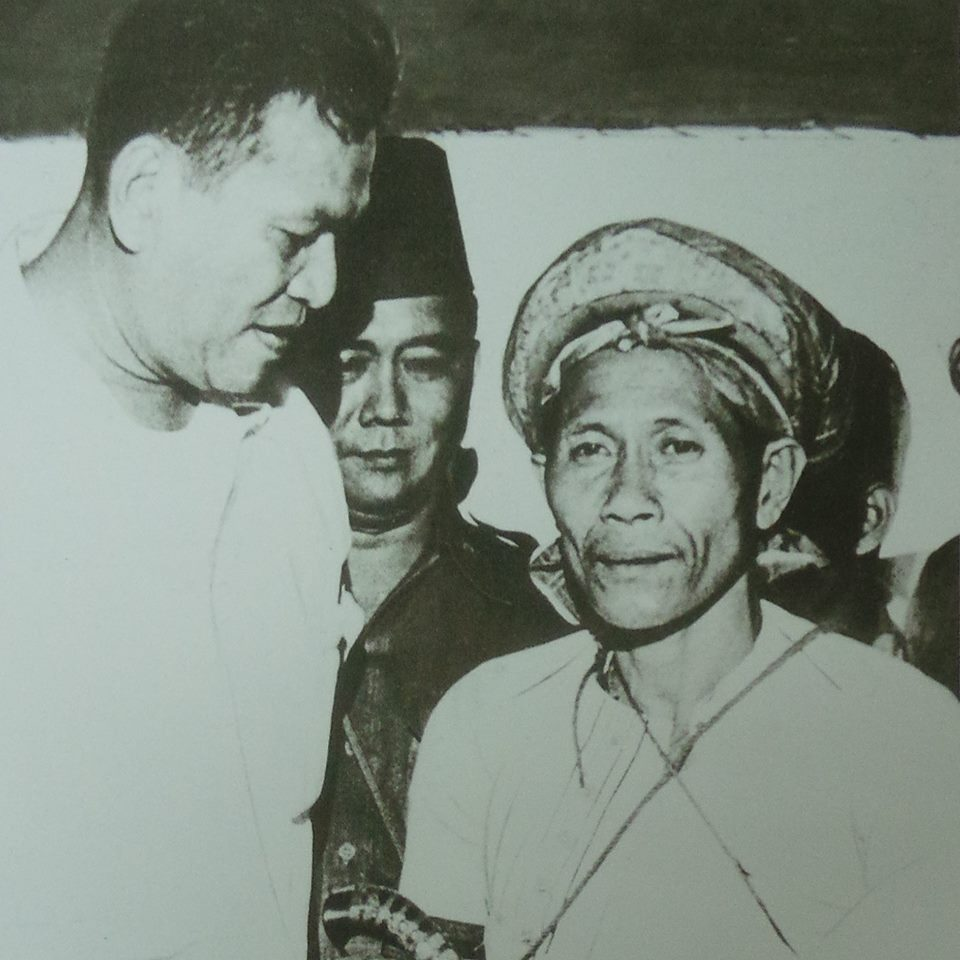
President Ramon Magsaysay with Hadji Kamlon.

More secessionism continued after the United States granted the Philippines full independence on July 4, 1946. Hadji Kamlon launched a rebellion. In response, Sulu's Representative Ombra Amilbangsa filed House Bill No. 5682 in the House of Representatives during the 4th Congress, which proposed granting independence for the Sulu islands.

==== MIM and BMLO ====
The Muslim Independence Movement arose in 1968 following the Jabidah massacre and advocated secession of the Mindanao, Sulu, and Palawan areas. The organization was later renamed the Mindanao Independence Movement so it could be inclusive to non-Muslims. The Blackshirts was an alleged armed wing of the MIM. By 1969, the group had received financial support from Malaysia but failed to garner wider support from the Moros.

The MIM was disbanded in 1970 after meeting with then President Ferdinand Marcos. Leaders from the disbanded MIM, both students and older lead figures, would form the Bangsa Moro Liberation Organization (BMLO), but the organization would be disbanded due to internal conflict.

==== Moro National Liberation Front ====
The Moro National Liberation Front (MNLF) was established as a result of the Jabidah massacre. While it's unclear when the MNLF was actually established, it considers the date of the incident, March 18, 1968, as its foundation date. The MNLF had Nur Misuari as its first chairman, and one of its early meetings was in October 1972 in Pangkor Island in Malaysia.

==== Moro Islamic Liberation Front ====
The Moro Islamic Liberation Front (MILF), led by Hashim Salamat, splintered off from the MNLF when it abandoned its bid for independence in 1978. The MILF formally dropped its bid for independence when it signed the Framework Agreement on the Bangsamoro with the Philippine national government in 2012.

==== Federal Republic of Mindanao ====
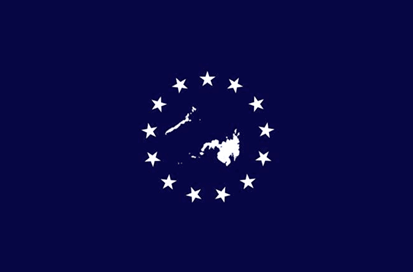
Proposed flags of the Federal Republic of Mindanao; left (1986) Middle (1990) Right left (1986)

===== Canoy and Noble proposals =====
Reuben Canoy, leader of the Mindanao People's Democratic Movement and former presidential candidate, had an averted plan to declare the Federal Republic of Mindanao in 1986. Four years later, the 1990 Mindanao crisis arose, where Col. Alexander Noble led a mutiny and proclaimed an independent Federal Republic of Mindanao. Noble, along with Canoy, who was also involved as a civilian supporter, was arrested by government authorities but claimed that his effort was successful since it brought attention to issues affecting Mindanao.

==== Alvarez proposal ====
External image
- 2005 Federal Republic of Mindanao Flag
- Photo of the proposed flag (black and white screencap on Philippine Daily Inquirer) for the Federal Republic of Mindanao as shown by Davao City Mayor Rodrigo Duterte on the July 3, 2005 airing of Gikan sa Masa, para sa Masa. The flag's colors were described in the Philippine Star as having a predominantly sky blue and navy blue color scheme. It has an eight-pointed red star in the center surrounded by eight white stars.

Davao del Norte Representative Pantaleon Alvarez has advocated for the secession of Mindanao from the Philippines. He reportedly held the stance as early as 2005 when Rodrigo Duterte, then the Mayor of Davao City, advocated for the Christian-majority portion of Mindanao to secede in the event President Gloria Macapagal Arroyo was deposed by a revolution or coup d'état. Alvarez had advocated an independence declaration "with or without GMA".

In November 2023, Alvarez proposed that Mindanao should push for independence if the national Philippine government continues to pursue its claim in the South China Sea dispute. In his opinion, pursuing the claim will drag Mindanao into an armed conflict if the national government continues its policy regarding China and expressed reluctance on the United States' commitment to side with the Philippines in a potential military confrontation.

In January 2024, amidst a People's Initiative bid launched to revise the Philippine constitution, Duterte has said that Alvarez is planning to launch a signature campaign proposing Mindanao independence. Alvarez has reiterated his support for Mindanao independence.

On February 27, 2024, Duterte backtracked and called his earlier pronouncements a bluff. However, Alvarez still affirmed that he was pursuing the advocacy, stating that there was "no rush" to declare an independent Mindanao. The Philippine Star and Taiwan-based Doublethink Lab noted on November 2023 to February 2024, China-based accounts promoting content on Mindanao independence.

The proposed independent Mindanao state in both the mid-2000s and the early 2020s was named the Federal Republic of Mindanao and would have a federal form of government

The mid-2000s proposal had eight constituent states, a national flag and a national anthem entitled "Land of Promise". Meanwhile the early 2020s proposal had six constituent states and a flag. Bukidnon was proposed as the capital. The Mindanao and Sabah Alliance (MASADA) stated that the Malaysian state of Sabah, which was historically part of the Sulu Sultanate, is also part of the proposed state.

In October 2025, Kiko Barzaga, who served as the representative for Cavite's fourth district, encouraged Mindanao to secede from the Philippines, claiming that politicians from Metro Manila are at the forefront of the corruption scandal and that Mindanao is seen as "less important" than Luzon.

==== Abu Sayyaf ====
The Abu Sayyaf was formed in 1991, splintering from the Moro National Liberation Front, with Abdurajak Abubakar Janjalani as its founder. Its professed goal is to establish an Islamic state comprising Mindanao, the Sulu archipelago, and Palawan as well as areas outside the Philippines, specifically Borneo and southern Thailand. The group split into two main factions after Janjalani's death, whose leaders in turn were killed in 2006 and 2007, which led to Abu Sayyaf splitting into several more factions. In 2014, several factions of the Abu Sayyaf swore allegiance to Islamic State of Iraq and Syria (ISIS), which aims to establish a larger Islamic state of its own.

==== December 2025 proposal ====
Several personalities in Cagayan de Oro passed a resolution on December 27, 2025, seeking the independence of Mindanao. The resolution cited "economic issues and problems" in the country "affecting the people of Mindanao" as the factors for the independence. A map planned for submission to the United Nations Special Committee on Decolonization included Palawan in the proposed sovereign state. Local Palaweño officials on January 6, 2026, opposed this inclusion, with the board member Ryan Maminta asserting that "Minsupala" (Mindanao–Sulu–Palawan) was never a political and legal entity, rather it was only an anthropological term "illustrating the connections and trade routes during the pre-colonial period".

== Greater autonomy ==
This includes efforts to secure greater autonomy for areas or regions in the Philippines while remaining an integral part of the country. These efforts involve either the creation of an autonomous region within a unitary state or grassroots movements for the creation of a certain subdivision within a federal Philippines.

=== Bansa Sug ===
At the Bangsa Sug Summit in 2018, participants of the convention, including claimants of the Sultanate of Sulu, called for the creation of a Bansa Sug federal state consisting of the Sulu Archipelago provinces and Zamboanga Peninsula. They also campaigned for the option to "opt-out" from the then-proposed Bangsamoro autonomous region.

In 2024, the Supreme Court declared the inclusion of Sulu in the Bangsamoro Autonomous Region in Muslim Mindanao (BARMM) unconstitutional, as the province had voted against ratifying the Bangsamoro Organic Law in the 2019 plebiscite. The Court subsequently affirmed the decision with finality, excluding Sulu from BARMM.

=== Historical bids ===
==== Bangsamoro ====
Flag of the eventual Bangsamoro autonomous region.

The Bangsamoro Autonomous Region in Muslim Mindanao (BARMM) is the only existing autonomous region in the Philippines. It was established after a peace deal between the Philippine government and the Moro Islamic Liberation Front (MILF), which originally pursued independence. The region was established in 2019 after a two-part plebiscite and succeeded the Autonomous Region in Muslim Mindanao (ARMM).

Previously, the Bangsamoro Juridical Entity was attempted to be established as part of the memorandum of agreement on ancestral domain (MO-AD) between the MILF and the Philippine government under the administration of President Gloria Macapagal Arroyo in 2008. However, the MO-AD was declared unconstitutional by the Supreme Court.

==== Federal State of the Visayas ====
The Federal State of the Visayas was an independent revolutionary state during the Philippine Revolution. Its proponents intended it to be a subunit of the Philippines under a federal form of government.

== Legality ==
It is impossible for any part of the Philippines to legally secede without amending the current 1987 Constitution, which includes a provision mandating the protection of the "territorial integrity of the Philippines".

== See also ==
- Autonomous Region in Muslim Mindanao
- North Borneo dispute
- Proposed federal states of the Philippines
- Philippine revolts against Spain
- Exclusive economic zone of the Philippines
- National and regional identity in Spain
- Spanish American wars of independence
- Ifni War
