= 1978 FAMAS Awards =

27th edition of Filipino movie awards

27th FAMAS Awards
- Date: May 20, 1978
- Site: Philippine International Convention Center

Highlights
- Best Picture: Bakya Mo Neneng ~ J.E. Productions
- Most awards: Bakya Mo Neneng ~ J.E. Productions ( 6 wins)

The 27th Filipino Academy of Movie Arts and Sciences (FAMAS) Awards was held on May 20, 1978, at the Philippine International Convention Center to honor outstanding achievements in films from 1977.

Bakya Mo Neneng of J.E. Productions won the most award with 6 wins including FAMAS Award for Best Picture, Best Director, Best Screenplay, Best Cinematography, Best Sound and Best Musical Score but its lead stars, Nora Aunor and Joseph Estrada failed to win acting Awards. Dolphy won his first his FAMAS Best Actor award for the film Omeng Santanasia and Susan Roces as best actress for the film Maligno.

== Awards ==
=== Major awards ===
Winners are listed first and highlighted with boldface.

Best Picture	Best Director
**Bakya Mo Neneng — J.E. Productions**; Maligno — Rosas Productions	**Augusto Buenaventura — Bakya Mo Neneng**; Pablo Santiago — Bontoc; Manuel Conde — Hostage... Hanapin si Batuigas!; Cesar J. Amigo — Sa Dulo ng Kris; Lino Brocka — Tahan Na Empoy, Tahan
Best Actor	Best Actress
**Dolphy — Omeng Satanasia**; Joseph Estrada — Bakya Mo Neneng; George Estregan — Hostage... Hanapin si Batuigas!; Christopher De Leon — Masarap, Masakit ang Umibig; Bembol Roco — Sa Piling ng Mga Sugapa:	**Susan Roces — Maligno**; Nora Aunor — Bakya Mo Neneng; Vilma Santos — Burlesk Queen; Daria Ramirez — Sinong Kapiling? Sinong Kasiping?; Alicia Alonzo — Tahan Na Empoy, tahan
Best Supporting Actor	Best Supporting Actress
**Mat Ranillo III — Masarap, Masakit ang Umibig**; Leroy Salvador — Mga Bilanggong Birhen; Roldan Aquino — Burlesk Queen; Leopoldo Salcedo — Halikan Mo at Magpaalam sa Kahapon; Ruel Vernal — Walang Katapusang Tag-araw	**Armida Siguion-Reyna — Tahan Na Empoy, Tahan**; Olivia Sanchez — Bakya Mo Neneng; Rosemarie Gil — Burlesk Queen; Dexter Doria — Inay; Liza Lorena — Walang Katapusang Tag-araw
Best Child Performer	Best Theme Song
**Niño Muhlach — Tahan Na Empoy, Tahan**; Vernadeth Calingbayan — Halikan Mo at Magpaalam sa Kahapon; Maritess Ardieta— Maligno	**Ryan Cayabyab — "Paraisong Parisukat" for the film Masikip, Maluwag**
Best in Screenplay	Best Story
**Augusto Buenaventura, Diego Cagahastian— Bakya Mo Neneng**	**Ruther Batuigas — Hostage: Hanapin si Batuigas**; Reuben R. Canoy and Cesar J. Amigo — Sa Dulo ng Kris
Best Sound	Best Musical Score
**Gregorio Ella — Bakya Mo Neneng**	**Ernani Cuenco — Bakya Mo Neneng**
Best Cinematography	Best Production Design
**Fredy Conde — Bakya Mo Neneng**	**Laida Perez — Mga Bilanggong Birhen**
Best Musical Film	Best Comedy Film
**Pag-ibig Ko'y Awitin Mo**	**Little Christmas Tree — FPJ Productions**
Best Editing
**Edgardo Vinarao — Hostage... Hanapin si Batuigas**

=== Special Awardee ===
- **Lifetime Achievement Award**
  - **Gerardo de Leon**
- **Loyalty Award**
  - **Tino Lapuz**
- **Special Sound Effects**
  - **Jun Martinez**
- **Best Still Photography**
  - **Charles Peralta**
- **Best Performance in a Standard Role (neither leading or supporting)**
  - **Boyet Orca**
- Hall of Fame Awardee: ~ **Premiere Productions, Inc. - Producer**
  - 1976 - Minsa'y Isang Gamu-gamo
  - 1960 - Huwag Mo Akong Limutin
  - 1957 - Kalibre .45
  - 1954 - Salabusab
  - 1952 - Ang Sawa sa Lumang Simboryo
