= Reuben Canoy =

Filipino politician (1929–2022)

The Honorable Reuben R. Canoy
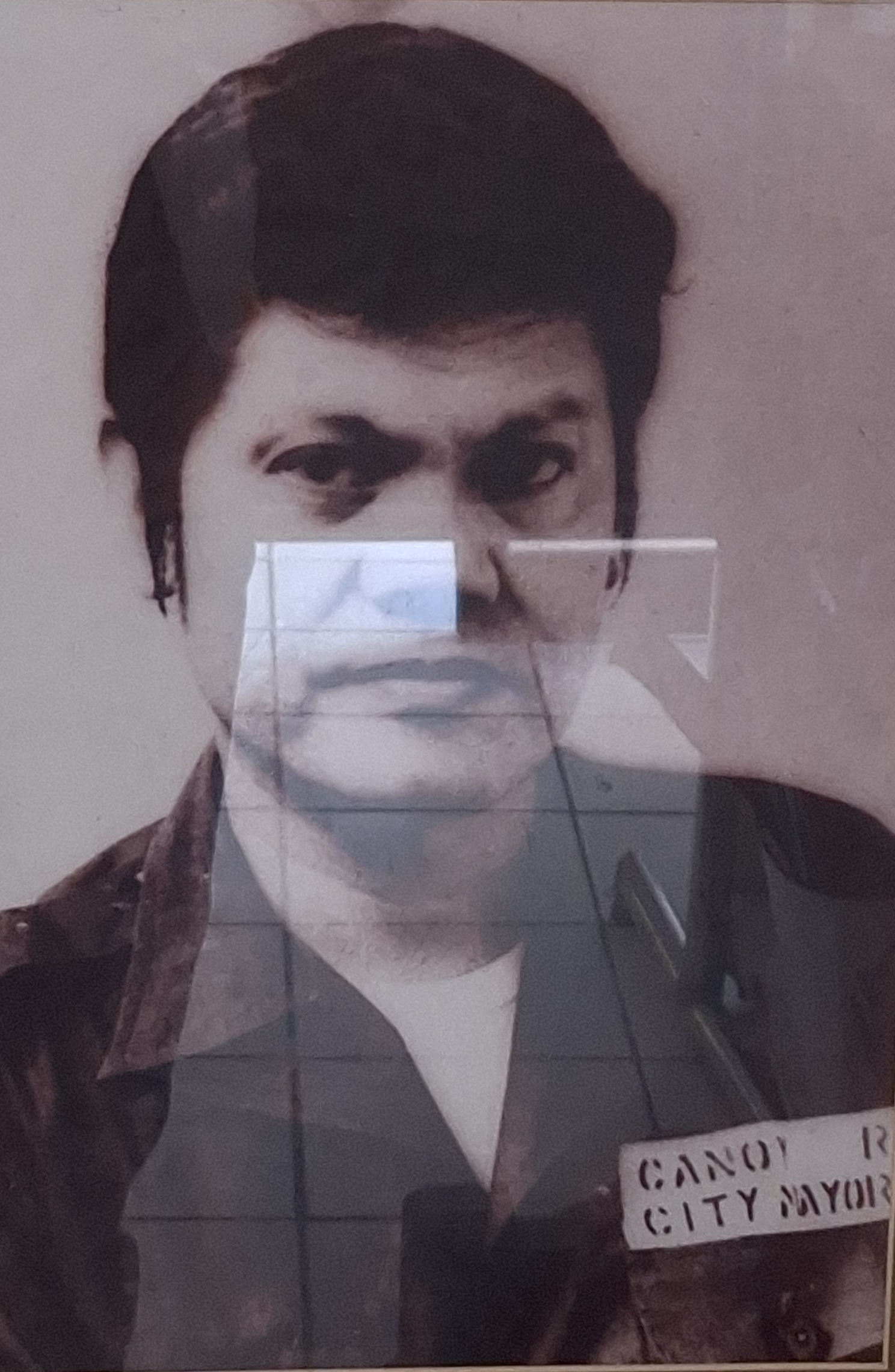

Member of the Interim Batasang Pambansa from Region X
- In office June 12, 1978 – June 5, 1984

5th Mayor of Cagayan de Oro
- In office 1971–1976
- Vice Mayor: Cecilio Luminarias
- Preceded by: Jesús Seriña, Sr.
- Succeeded by: Concordio Diel

Personal details
- Born: June 6, 1929 Cagayan de Oro, Misamis, Philippine Islands
- Died: July 5, 2022 (aged 93) Cagayan de Oro, Misamis Oriental, Philippines
- Party: LDP
- Other political affiliations: Mindanao Alliance
- Spouse: Solona Torralba

Reuben Rabe Canoy (June 6, 1929 – July 5, 2022) was a Filipino lawyer, writer, film producer and politician who served as mayor of Cagayan de Oro from 1971 to 1976 and as legislator in the 1970s and 1980s.

Initially allied with president Ferdinand Marcos in the 1960s, he later resigned from his government positions in 1976 after defecting to the opposition. In April 1978, Canoy was the sole Mindanao Alliance candidate to win a parliamentary seat in the Interim Batasang Pambansa election. He ran unsuccessfully in the 1986 snap presidential election, and attempted in the succeeding years to have Mindanao secede from the Philippines and become the Federal Republic of Mindanao, for which he was imprisoned in 1990.

== Early life, education, and film career ==
The son of Mariano Canoy and Laureana Rabe, Reuben Canoy received his law degree in 1953 from Silliman University. He became editor of the literary folio Sands & Coral from 1951 to 1953. He also served as president of the Cagayan de Oro Press Club (COPC), the oldest news media organization in Mindanao, from 1962 to 1963.

Canoy also worked as a screenwriter, writing various screenplays with his friend Cesar J. Amigo, a colleague from Sands & Coral, for films such as The Passionate Strangers (1966), Babae... Sa Likod ng Salamin (1976), and Sa Dulo ng Kris (1977). He was also the producer and screenwriter of The Mad Doctor of Blood Island (1969). In 2013, he won at the Genre Film Scriptwriting Competition organized by the Film Development Council of the Philippines for his script The Unbelievers.

== Political life and advocacy ==
Canoy first joined the government as an undersecretary in the Department of Public Information (DPI) in 1966 under Secretary Francisco Tatad. Canoy ran and won for mayor of Cagayan de Oro in 1971 and served until 1976. During his term, he implemented the division of city barangays into 80 villages divided into 40 "urban" barangays and 40 "rural" barangays. He was also instrumental in the construction of the Don Gregorio Pelaez Sports Center, and the organization of the Cagayan de Oro Water District.

Though initially supportive of President Ferdinand Marcos, he defected to the opposition in 1976 and proceeded to resign from his various government positions such as city mayor. By 1978, he formed with Aquilino Pimentel Jr. and Homobono Adaza the Mindanao Alliance, which opposed Marcos' martial law regime and was sympathetic to the cause of the Moro National Liberation Front. Canoy was elected in 1978 as the representative of Region X (Northern Mindanao) in the Interim Batasang Pambansa as the only winning opposition candidate to represent the region. In 1979, he wrote Real Autonomy: The Answer to the Mindanao Problem where he advocated autonomy as a solution to the Moro conflict in Mindanao.

He formed the Social Democratic Party of the Philippines in 1981 which caused his expulsion from the Mindanao Alliance. Canoy ran for president of the Philippines in the snap election of 1986 and took about 34,000 votes. He formed the Mindanao People's Democratic Movement and tried to declare the separation of Mindanao from the Philippines as the Federal Republic of Mindanao in April 1986 but was advised not to pursue the said declaration. Canoy was imprisoned for his role as a leading civilian supporter of Colonel Alexander Noble's revolt in October 1990 as a leader of the Mindanao Independence Movement but was later released.

Canoy ran for senator in 2001 as a candidate of the Puwersa ng Masa party but lost. Canoy supported the candidacy of Fernando Poe Jr. as president in the 2004 elections.

== Later life and death ==
Under the administration of President Rodrigo Duterte, Canoy became a member of the Consultative Committee with the purpose of amending the current constitution of the Philippines enacted in 1987. Canoy was invited to run for vice mayor of Cagayan de Oro under the Partido Federal ng Pilipinas in the 2019 general election but declined due to "his old age and health issues". Until his last days, his commentaries were broadcast with the Radio Mindanao Network program Perspective in Visayas and Mindanao.

Canoy died of a heart attack at the age of 93 on July 5, 2022. His remains were cremated and placed inside an urn together with the ashes of his predeceased wife, Solona, before being interred at the Eternal Gardens-Greenhills in Bulua, Cagayan de Oro.

== Family ==
Canoy married Solona Torralba in 1953 and had four children. Solana died on February 3, 2019, at the age of 94.

His brothers were Henry Canoy, one of the founders of Radio Mindanao Network, and Nestor Canoy, a doctor who settled in Columbia, Missouri in the United States and died on July 27, 2017.

== Selected works ==
- Deep River (1950)
- Wardrobe Item (1950)
- Real Autonomy: The Answer to the Mindanao Problem (1979)
- The Counterfeit Revolution: Martial Law in the Philippines
- The Quest for Mindanao independence (Cagayan de Oro City: Mindanao Post Publishing Company, 1987)
- Island of Fear (Metro Manila: Solar Publishing Corporation, 1987)
- The History of Mindanao (2001)
- Terror in Paradise (2005)
