= Pepederalismo =

- Good News Game Show with Drew and Mocha episode
- Presented by: Mocha Uson; Drew Olivar
- Original release date: August 2, 2018

"Pepederalismo" (sometimes also called "Pepedederalismo" by some sources) refers to a dance and jingle on an internet video featuring Drew Olivar and Mocha Uson. A part of the duo's online video series Good News Game Show with Drew and Mocha, the particular video was meant to promote then-Philippine President Rodrigo Duterte's campaign for the adoption of a federal form of government in the Philippines.

The video received widespread negative reception for the sexually suggestive theme of the dance. Since Uson was concurrent Presidential Communications Assistant Secretary in the Presidential Communications Operations Office (PCOO) at that time, there was concerns that the PCOO's budget was being spent unwisely due to the video but Uson has clarified that the video was produced under a personal capacity for her online blog and the PCOO has stated that the video was unauthorized.

== Background ==
Internet vlogger and Presidential Communications Assistant Secretary in the Presidential Communications Operations Office (PCOO) Mocha Uson aimed to promote awareness and buzz on President Rodrigo Duterte's push for Federalism in the Philippines which has been going on for two years already. Uson had previously produced videos tackling the topic. She was joined by fellow vlogger Drew Olivar who co-hosted in the Pepederalismo video.

== Content ==
I-pepe, i-pepe, i-dede, i-dede, i-pepe-pepe-pepederalismo

— Lyrics of the jingle in the video.

The Pepederalismo video featured Mocha Uson and Drew Olivar. The most noted part of the video was Olivar singing and dancing to a jingle about federalism. He gestured toward his crotch and chest during the dance.

Olivar also provided a briefer on federalism by mentioning countries that use a federal form of government. He mentions the United States as one of those countries but incorrectly used France and Singapore as examples. France is a unitary semi‑presidential constitutional republic while Singapore is a parliamentary republic.

== Production ==
The video was filmed in the Malacañang Palace during office hours. Mocha Uson who is also an official in the PCOO said that no government funds were used for the production of the video. PCOO secretary Martin Andanar said that the video was unauthorized and did not go through official PCOO channels.

== Release ==
The Pepederalismo video was originally posted on August 2, 2018, as an episode of Mocha Uson's online game show Good News Game Show with Drew and Mocha in Facebook in August 2018.

== Reception ==
The video received negative public reception for its sexually suggestive theme in social media, from politicians and other local celebrities. Pepe and dede are Filipino street slang for vagina and breast respectively.

=== Government ===
Presidential spokesperson Harry Roque relayed that while President Rodrigo Duterte did not find humor on the video was "cool" with it since he is a supporter of freedom of expression and the president himself has a tendency to use vulgar language. Roque added that Duterte found the video "unconventional" but prefers a more "rational approach to the dissemination". Roque nevertheless recognized the role of the video for making federalism a topic of public discussion but maintained that moving forward the debate on federalism should progress into something "more substantive".

Vice President Leni Robredo on her part remarked that the video did not help Duterte's campaign for federalism, even if Uson and Olivar intended to do so. She added that them having to resort to produce the video have not only "disrespected the president but the Filipinos as well".

Senator Grace Poe filed a resolution before the Senate urging for a probe on the national government's ₱90 million information drive on federalism.

=== Response to reception by Uson and Olivar ===
Mocha Uson said that the buzz generated should be taken advantage by experts to explain the concept of federalism. Olivar in response to people seeing sexual innuendo to his dance were doing so out of "envy" and said that pepe is a reference to Filipino writer Jose Rizal's nickname and heroism while dede symbolizes love and refers to a breast of a mother. Olivar also said that he was not paid for his role in the video insisting he is already rich.

Uson also released further statements in response to criticism and misrepresentation against her by online users in social media. She pointed out that it was only Olivar who danced in the video and that she herself did not, the video is not part of the government's official info drive for federalism and is part of a game show for her online blog stating that the video was recorded prior to her meeting with the Consultative Committee at Department of the Interior and Local Government on August 3, 2018.

== Aftermath ==
The campaign on federalism for the Philippines as a whole failed to gain traction. Just over six months before he has to step down, President Rodrigo Duterte in December 2021 remarked the lack of support for the issue in Congress. In mid-2019, a member of the Cabinet reportedly said the Pepederalismo video "poured very cold water on the federalism initiative".
