= Joe Cantada =

Filipino TV host

- Born: Jose J. Cantada; March 15, 1942; Commonwealth of the Philippines
- Died: March 22, 1992 (aged 50); San Francisco, California, U.S.
- Occupations: TV host; Sports commentator

Jose J. Cantada, better known as "Smokin'" Joe Cantada, (March 15, 1942 – March 22, 1992) was a Filipino TV host, anchor & commentator. He died of lung cancer in March 1992. He distinguished himself with his smooth baritone voice and his flawless use of figures of speech and idioms in calling sports events.

Together with Pinggoy Pengson, Cantada was a senior anchorman for the Vintage Sports' PBA coverage in the 1980s. He was previously a boxing and cycling commentator.

== Career ==
Cantada started his career as a staff announcer doing an early morning program for a radio station in 1962. He then transferred to DZHP where he spent many years honing his talents with the likes of Harry Gasser, Ronnie Nathanielsz, Larry Cruz and others. He did the coverage of the 1964 Tokyo Olympics where he did the blow-by-blow account of the final round loss by Anthony Villanueva to Soviet boxer Stanislav Stepashkin.

One of Cantada's greatest moments were being the ring announcer at the Thrilla in Manila fight between Muhammad Ali and Joe Frazier and doing the commentary of the first Sugar Ray Leonard - Thomas Hearns bout in Las Vegas.

From there, he moved on to far greater heights by anchoring the PBA games for its television production franchise holder, Vintage Enterprises in 1982. For the first eight years of Vintage's coverage, the program had Cantada as its main broadcaster with Pinggoy Pengson, Sev Sarmenta and Ed Picson as three of its play-by-play commentators. The last coverage of Cantada was the replay of Shell vs. Purefoods game held last April 9, 1991.

== Death ==
Cantada's last TV appearance was when he became the play-by-play commentator for the replay match of the controversial Shell-Purefoods game on April 9, 1991. He bade goodbye unexpectedly because of health problems. This resulted in a bum stomach that rushed him in Makati Medical Center later that day; Cantada then went to the US to check his throat infection but doctors discovered that he had lung cancer, which was incurable that time. The commentator died on March 22, 1992, in San Francisco, California.

A tribute was held in his honor by the PBA a day after he died. Sev Sarmenta hosted the special program at the NASA (now PhilSports Arena).

On May 29, 2005, he was posthumously inducted as one of the first members of the PBA Hall of Fame.

== Filmography ==
Year	Title	Role	Note(s)	Ref(s).
1976	Babae... Sa Likod ng Salamin			
1977	Sa Dulo ng Kris	Outlaw		
1978	Isang Gabi sa Iyo... Isang Gabi sa Akin			
1979	Arnis			
