= 403rd Infantry Brigade =

- Active: July 15, 1973 - Present
- Country: Philippines
- Branch: Philippine Army
- Type: Infantry
- Role: Conventional Warfare, Anti-Guerrilla Operations
- Size: 2 to 4 maneuver Battalions.
- Part of: Under the 4th Infantry (DIAMOND) Division
- Garrison/HQ: Camp Osito Bahian, Impalambong, Malaybalay City
- Nickname(s): Peacemaker Brigade
- Motto(s): Blessed are the Peacemakers..For they shall be called the Children of God –Matthew 5:9
- Anniversaries: 15 July
- Engagements: Anti-guerilla operations against the NPA and the Moro Islamic Liberation Front

Commanders
- Current commander: Colonel Ferdinand T. Barandon
- Notable commanders: Col Mariano P Adalem PA, BGen Cristino R Piol AFP, Col Gregorio M Camiling Jr PA, Col Eugenio V Cedo PA, BGen Edgardo Y. De Leon AFP

Insignia
- Unit Patch: same as emblem above

The 403rd Infantry Brigade, 4th Infantry Division, Philippine Army, known officially as the Peacemaker Brigade, is one of the brigades of the Philippine Army which is organic to its 4th Infantry (Diamond) Division. It is an infantry unit, and specializes in anti-guerrilla warfare.

== History ==
The 403rd Infantry (PEACEMAKER) Brigade traces its roots to the 3rd Infantry Brigade of the 4th Infantry Division, otherwise known as the 3/4th Brigade, being the forerunner of the unit, when it was organized on 15 July 1973 pursuant to General Order Nr 41 Headquarters Philippine Army dated 3 July 1973. Since then, it facilitates the command and control of the newly organized Infantry Battalions as called for by the ever growing Muslim secessionist movement in the 4ID AOR. The Brigade was operationally organized and deployed on 15 September 1973 with its first headquarters at Pagadian City under its first Brigade Commander, Colonel Oscar Aleonar, who was also then the Assistant Division Commander of the 4th Infantry Division. Its operating battalions then were 28IB, 9IB and 16IB, all operating in the areas of Zamboanga del Norte particularly in the municipalities of Siraway and Siocon. Eventually, it was redeployed in the other areas of north eastern Mindanao.

=== Mission ===
The 403rd Infantry (Peacemaker) Brigade conducts Internal Security Operations (ISO) in the assigned area of responsibility (AOR) of the 4th Infantry Division in Camiguin, Bukidnon and Misamis Oriental Provinces to dismantle and destroy the remaining guerilla fronts of the Local Communist Movement (LCM), hold and contain the Moro Islamic Liberation Front (MILF) in Wao and Bumbaran of Lanao del Sur and destroy other threat groups in order to attain peace and stability conducive to sustainable development in assisting the Philippine government in its socio-economic development projects; and assists the Philippine National Police curb criminalities in the area.

== Units ==
The following are the Infantry Battalion units that are presently placed under operational control of the brigade:

- 8th Infantry (Dependable) Battalion
- 88th Infantry (Maringal) Battalion
- 1st Special Forces (Anytime Anywhere) Battalion
- 58th Infantry (Dimalulupig) Battalion
- 65th Infantry (Stalwart) Battalion

== Operations ==
- Anti-guerrilla operations against the New People's Army and the Moro National Liberation Front (MNLF). After a peace agreement was concluded between Philippine and MNLF officials, the brigade fought against the Moro Islamic Liberation Front (MILF).

== Trivia ==
- Two of its former commanders, Colonels Mariano P Adalem and Gregorio M Camiling Jr, rose to become the Commanding General of the Philippine Army and retired in that position with the ranks of Major General and Lieutenant General, respectively.
