= Sa Dulo ng Kris =

1977 Filipino action drama film

- Directed by: Cesar J. Amigo
- Written by: Reuben R. Canoy; Cesar J. Amigo
- Produced by: Reuben R. Canoy
- Starring: Joseph Estrada; Vic Vargas; Inez Bond Manapul; Joe Cantada
- Cinematography: Freddie Conde
- Edited by: Boy Cuenco
- Music by: Ernani Cuenco
- Production company: Rueben Canoy Productions
- Release date: March 16, 1977
- Country: Philippines
- Language: Filipino

Sa Dulo ng Kris (lit. 'At the edge of a kris') is a 1977 Filipino action drama film directed by Cesar J. Amigo from a script by Amigo and producer Reuben Canoy. Starring Joseph Estrada, Vic Vargas, Inez Bond Manapul and Joe Cantada, it is about a Moro rebel leader (Estrada) in a Mindanao province who is forced to fight his own brother (Vargas), a dedicated military officer. The film was released in March 1977, and was the last film written or directed by Amigo.

Sa Dulo ng Kris received two nominations at the 27th FAMAS Awards, for Best Director (Amigo) and Best Story (Canoy and Amigo).

== Cast ==
- Joseph Estrada as Ali
- Vic Vargas
- Inez Bond Manapul
- Joe Cantada as the outlaw
- Angelo Buenaventura
- Tony Delgado
- Anna Liza Lluch
- Larena Guevarra
- Imam Naik
- Baldo Maro
- Romy Nario
- Dante Diaz
- Lorrie de la Serna
- Tanny Sudario

== Production ==
=== Background ===
Reuben Canoy, a writer and former mayor of Cagayan de Oro, was a supporter of the Marcos administration until 1976 when he defected to the opposition. He would also come to form in 1978 the Mindanao Alliance, a political coalition that was sympathetic to the cause of the Moro National Liberation Front (MNLF).

== Release ==
=== Critical reception ===
In his 1991 book Possibilities for Peace in Southern Philippines, social scientist Nagasura Madale criticized Sa Dulo ng Kris for being "full of misconceptions and misrepresentation of the true culture, history and values of the Muslims."

=== Home media ===
On May 4, 2024, OctoArts Films made the film available for streaming without charge on YouTube.

== Accolades ==
Group	Category	Name	Result
FAMAS Awards	Best Director	Cesar J. Amigo	Nominated
FAMAS Awards	Best Story	Reuben R. Canoy and Cesar J. Amigo	Nominated
