= 1990 Mindanao revolt =

Filipino coup

- Part of the 1986–90 Philippine coup attempts
- Proposed flag of the Federal Republic of Mindanao
Date	October 4–6, 1990
Location	Cagayan de Oro, Butuan and Iligan, Mindanao, Philippines
Result	Government victory: Disestablishment of the Federal Republic of Mindanao; Arrest of Col. Alexander Noble

Belligerents
Federal Republic of Mindanao	Philippines

Commanders and leaders
Col. Alexander Noble; Reuben Canoy	(Philippines) Corazon Aquino (Philippines) Fidel Ramos (Philippines) Renato de Villa

Units involved
Noble loyalists Parts of the Philippine Army 4th Infantry Division	Armed Forces of the Philippines

Strength
about 800–1150; 200 troops (Cagayan de Oro); 600 civilian supporters (Cagayan de Oro); 200 troops (Butuan); 150 elite Scout Rangers (Iligan)	2 T-28 planes Undetermined number of troops

Casualties and losses
240 rebels surrendered or arrested	1 pilot killed after crashing in Cebu due to a malfunction
- at least 1 wounded

The 1990 Mindanao revolt was an uprising that occurred in parts of the island of Mindanao in the southern Philippines. It began when Alexander Noble, a dissident Philippine Army colonel linked to the 1989 Philippine coup attempt against President Corazon Aquino, and his supporters, which included Mindanaoan separatists, seized two military garrisons in Cagayan de Oro and Butuan without firing a shot and unilaterally proclaimed the independence of the Federal Republic of Mindanao on October 4, 1990, to be led by a civilian-military junta and with an ultimate goal of removing Aquino from office. However, Noble failed to gain support, and surrendered two days later following attacks by government forces. The revolt was the last overt attempt to overthrow Aquino's government until the end of her term in 1992.

== Background ==
=== Noble ===
Alexander Noble (1948-2024) was a Philippine Army Colonel who graduated from the Philippine Military Academy in 1969. Subsequently reaching the rank of colonel, he served as commander of the 23rd Infantry Battalion in Agusan del Sur from 1980 to 1985, where he organized and trained tribal warriors against the communist New People's Army, and was even baptized as a datu by the Higaonon tribe.

=== Role in the 1989 coup attempt ===
During the presidency of Corazon Aquino, Noble served as deputy commander of the Presidential Security Group (PSG) and helped defend Malacañang Palace during a coup attempt in 1987 launched by the Reform the Armed Forces Movement (RAM) led by Colonel Gringo Honasan. However, after leaving the unit and returning to Agusan del Sur, he switched sides and supported RAM in its failed attempt to topple Aquino in 1989.

During the preparations leading to the 1989 coup, he went around Mindanao, establishing connections and support among disgruntled military officers and separatist politicians such as former Cagayan de Oro mayor Reuben Canoy and organizations such as Canoy's Mindanao Independence Movement and the Mindanao Freedom Movement. The latter movement was composed of landowners who opposed Aquino's Comprehensive Agrarian Reform Program and was promised protection by Noble in its plans to declare Mindanao's independence upon the success of the coup. He also provided RAM with details of Aquino's security arrangements from his service in the PSG, which was put into use when RAM planes bombed Malacañang on December 2. However, Aquino was unharmed as the plans had been revised after Noble's departure. Noble later admitted his willingness to kill Aquino "if necessary" should she decide to seek refuge in the US Embassy. During that time, Noble was believed to have received funds from loggers in the region.

On his way to Manila to join the coup, he was apprehended at a checkpoint in Santa Rita, Samar but escaped shortly afterwards with the help of sympathetic officers, leaving behind weapons, cash and documents that linked RAM and what Noble referred to as the “Armed Forces of Mindanao”. Following the failure of the coup, Noble went into hiding in the jungles of Agusan del Sur, where he was sheltered by local tribespeople, and amassed a following of about 500 military followers from two infantry units that had been chasing him, as well as about 300 Higaonon tribesmen whom he had trained personally. While in hiding, Noble announced his support for Mindanao's secessionist movement.

=== Preparations for the revolt ===
After the 1989 coup, RAM devised a new strategy which it called the "enclave concept", in which rebellions would be staged in isolated pockets in the countryside in order to scatter and weaken government resources for a final takeover. During a Senate hearing, the head of the National Intelligence Coordinating Agency, General Rodolfo Canieso, said that Noble was in charge of the plan, codenamed "Phase III", which was to divide the country by forming a junta in the Visayas and Mindanao.

== Events ==
=== Seizure of bases ===
The revolt began shortly after midnight on October 4, 1990, when about 400 men of the Philippine Army's 53rd Infantry Battalion took over the headquarters of the 402nd Infantry Brigade in Butuan, Agusan del Norte without resistance and captured the camp's commander, Colonel Hercules Galon. Armed Forces of the Philippines Chief of Staff General Renato de Villa initially said that the rebels were led by two officers he identified only as a "Major Cerdeno" and "Lieutenant Batac" before intelligence sources identified Noble as its leader.

Following the takeover, Noble led a column of troops and military vehicles towards Cagayan de Oro, Misamis Oriental. They waved red, blue and green flags representing an independent Mindanao and were met by Reuben Canoy and around 1,500 civilian supporters of the Mindanao Independence Movement. They paraded around the city with and were greeted by around 3,000 residents before seizing Camp Edilberto Evangelista, Mindanao's second largest military camp and headquarters of the 4th Infantry Division, whose commander, Brigadier General Miguel Sol, escaped to Manila. The rebels met no resistance while pro-government troops barricaded themselves inside their barracks behind barbed wire defenses. The rebels subsequently cut communications between Manila and the areas they controlled and distributed leaflets declaring that the "war for the liberation of Mindanao" had started.

In Iligan, Lanao del Norte, 100 km (62 mi) west of Cagayan de Oro, about 150 members of an elite army Scout Ranger unit reportedly declared support for Noble but did not become involved in the rebellion. Two hours later, government warplanes strafed rebel troops advancing on an army camp near Iligan, while T-28 fighter bombers knocked out a rebel Sikorsky helicopter over the camp.

=== Government response ===
President Aquino urged the country's security forces to stop the rebellion. The Armed Forces of the Philippines was put into red alert. Hundreds of troops were stationed near its headquarters in Camp Aguinaldo, Quezon City, to bolster security. During that time, a bomb placed in a parked jeepney inside the camp exploded, injuring one, while another detonated near government buildings in Manila. All flights to and from Mindanao were cancelled.

On October 5, two T-28 planes from Mactan Air Base in Cebu bombed the garrison in Butuan forcing the rebels to evacuate. On their way to another sortie against a rebel helicopter in Cagayan de Oro, one of the planes developed engine failure and crashed in Cebu, killing its pilot, who was the only fatality during the revolt.

=== Resolution ===
After realizing that his position was weakening, and following negotiations facilitated by Misamis Occidental governor Vicente Emano, on October 6, Noble unconditionally surrendered to Senator and former Cagayan de Oro Mayor Aquilino Pimentel Jr. at 3:00 am along with his classmate in the Philippine Military Academy, Colonel Victor Erfe, who was also implicated in previous coup attempts. Canoy, along with former Cagayan de Oro mayor Constantino Jaraula, was arrested at a hotel and detained inside a small container van at the back of the Misamis Oriental provincial capitol.

About 240 rebel soldiers surrendered or were arrested. Noble and Erfe were escorted to Manila by military officials led by Brigadier General Arturo Enrile, superintendent of the Philippine Military Academy, and detained at Camp Aguinaldo. Despite his arrest, Noble said that he was successful in his goal into bringing attention to the issues affecting Mindanao.

== Analysis and reactions ==
According to De Villa and Defense Secretary Fidel Ramos, Noble was promised by and counted on support from army supporters, communist guerrillas and Muslim separatists, only to be abandoned once he launched his revolt. De Villa also said that Noble was operating together with the RAM leadership. Aquino's military advisor, Mariano Adalem, said that the revolt was a possible distraction and a regional destabilization effort leading to a coup d'etat. One of Noble's comrades subsequently admitted that the revolt was "premature and haphazardly done".

US ambassador Nicholas Platt said that the United States strongly condemned "any effort to destabilize the elected Philippine government", while congressional leaders threatened to block aid to the Philippines should a military regime seize power. The Archbishop of Manila, Cardinal Jaime Sin, called the rebel leaders "misguided and misled members of the citizenry."

== Aftermath ==
Noble was placed on court-martial and jailed until 1993, when he applied for an amnesty presented to RAM members and other coup participants by President Fidel Ramos. In 1995, he ran for Governor of Agusan del Sur but lost by a wide margin to the incumbent, Democrito Plaza.

Despite government prosecutors presenting minted money and passports of the Federal Republic of Mindanao as evidence, both Canoy and Jaraula were later released, with Canoy continuing to advocate for independence, and later, for more autonomous and federal powers for Mindanao until his death in 2022 at the age of 93.

== See also ==
- Coup attempts against Corazon Aquino
