= Partido Federal ng Pilipinas =

Federalist political party in the Philippines

- Abbreviation: PFP
- Secretary-General: Rodolfo Albano III
- President: Reynaldo Tamayo Jr.
- Chairman: Bongbong Marcos (Note: Disputed by party member Abubakar Mangelen and his faction until 2024.)
- Founder: John Castriciones
- Founded: October 5, 2018; 8 years ago
- Split from: Coalition for Change
- Headquarters: 5th Floor, Transcom Building, 31 EDSA, Mandaluyong
- Youth wing: Kabataang Federal
- Membership (2021): 1.5 million
- Ideology: Federalism; Populism; Conservatism; Social democracy
- Political position: Big tent
- National affiliation: Bagong Pilipinas (since 2024); UniTeam (2021–2024); Coalition for Change (2018–2021)
- Colors: Blue; Red; Green (until 2021)
- Slogan: Kalayaan at Kaunlaran ('Independence and Progress')
- Senate: 0 / 24
- House of Representatives: 51 / 318
- Provincial Governors: 24 / 82
- Provincial Vice Governors: 21 / 82
- Provincial Board Members: 193 / 840

Website
- pfp.ph

The Partido Federal ng Pilipinas (PFP; English: Federal Party of the Philippines) is a national political party in the Philippines. It is chaired by Bongbong Marcos, president of the Philippines, who was elected in the 2022 election. During the run-up to the 2022 general election, the UniTeam alliance was formed by the PFP, Lakas–CMD, Hugpong ng Pagbabago (HNP), and Pwersa ng Masang Pilipino (PMP), with guest candidates from other parties.

PFP was formed in 2018 by supporters of President Rodrigo Duterte and calls for federalism in the Philippines.

== History ==
=== Formation and early years: 2018–2021 ===
PFP logo from 2018 to 2021

The Partido Federal ng Pilipinas was formed in early 2018 by supporters of President Rodrigo Duterte, including the Mayor Rodrigo Roa Duterte-National Executive Coordinating Committee (MRRD-NECC), a group that supported his 2016 presidential campaign, as well as former members of PDP–Laban, Duterte's party. The party was formally accredited by the Commission on Elections (COMELEC) on October 5, 2018, and was approved as a national political party on November 5 that year. Former DILG undersecretary and MRRD-NECC member Jesus "Jayvee" Hinlo Jr. was the party's founding president, while Secretary of Agrarian Reform John Castriciones, also from the MRRD-NECC, is recognized as the party's founder. Castriciones succeeded Hinlo as party president when the latter decided to run for senator in the 2019 elections. PFP had also requested Duterte to be their chairman.

Notable politicians who ran under PFP in 2019 include E. R. Ejercito, Reynaldo Umali, Joy Belmonte, and Donya Tesoro. In that year's elections, 238 PFP members were elected to office, including six seats (Note: Taking into account party switching.) in the House of Representatives. Reynaldo Tamayo Jr., who was elected governor of South Cotabato, became the party's new president.

=== Bongbong Marcos era: 2021–present ===
In September 2021, the party unanimously nominated Bongbong Marcos as their presidential candidate for 2022. Marcos joined the party on October 5 and became their chairman. He filed his candidacy the following day. Having no official vice presidential candidate, PFP adopted Duterte's daughter, Davao City mayor Sara Duterte of Lakas–CMD, as Marcos' running mate. PFP, Lakas–CMD, Hugpong ng Pagbabago (HNP), and Pwersa ng Masang Pilipino (PMP) then formed the UniTeam alliance.

In December 2021, a group claiming to be the real officers of PFP filed a disqualification case against Marcos. The group's leader, National Commission on Muslim Filipinos commissioner Abubakar Mangelen, who claims to be the true chairman of PFP, called Marcos' nomination "invalid and void", claiming that many party officers were not consulted or informed about it. Secretary-General Thompson Lantion claimed that Mangelen was ousted as chairman of the party during its last convention on September 18, 2021 and was replaced by Marcos with his consent, although Mangelen still remains as a member of the party. However, Mangelen denied the said claim and argued that he was the duly elected chairman of the party as shown in its petition for registration filed before the COMELEC and accused PFP members of unseating him as chairman without due process in order to make Marcos the leader of the party. On February 10, 2022, the COMELEC dismissed the case against the disqualification of Marcos for "lack of merit." On February 14, Mangelen filed a motion for reconsideration at COMELEC, which after an en banc review, was finally dismissed a day after the election.

On March 30, 2022, at a campaign rally in Iligan, the Mangelen-led faction endorsed the presidential campaign of Manila mayor Isko Moreno (Aksyon Demokratiko). The endorsement was affirmed and supported by Castriciones, now a PDP–Laban member, who was also present in the said campaign rally. Lantion of the Marcos-led faction condemned the Mangelen wing's endorsement as "irresponsible" and "fake," and called Mangelen an "impostor." However, Castriciones stood by Mangelen and called him the "true chairman." On April 19, the Mangelen-led faction changed their endorsement to Vice President Leni Robredo, calling her campaign "more formidable" to beat "the greatest threat to our country and our democracy, Ferdinand Marcos Jr."

On May 25, Bongbong Marcos and Sara Duterte were proclaimed winners by the Congress of the Philippines. It was the first time under the 1987 Constitution that the President and Vice President were elected by a majority of voters.

In 2023, a group led by Leandro Verceles and Antonio Rodriguez Jr. claimed leadership over the PFP from officials affiliated with Marcos, including President Reynaldo Tamayo Jr., Secretary General Thompson Lantion and General Counsel George Briones, claiming that their tenure had already expired and that the former group were the rightful president and secretary general following elections held under the party's 2018 constitution. On August 22, 2025, the Supreme Court ruled in favor of Tamayo's faction, citing the validity of the party's constitution updated in 2022.

== Ideology and political positions ==
PFP seeks to replace the Philippines' unitary system of government with a federalist government.

The party's general counsel, George Briones, describes PFP as "a party of the common man.... of the poor.... of the grassroots", and the party's dream is "a society that is free of illegal drugs, free of corruption, free of crime, free of insurgency and free of poverty." Party president Reynaldo Tamayo Jr. says the PFP's principles are: humanism, patriotic federalism, enlightened socialism, and direct democracy. He also declared that PFP "values human dignity and will aspire for equality among all Filipinos." The party's slogan is "a life worthy of human dignity for every Filipino."

The PFP-OFW International Affairs Committee presented a long-term plan for Overseas Filipino Workers (OFW) that includes skills training, benefits, retirement plans, health insurance, scholarship grants, and other support services.

Political scientist Julio C. Teehankee classifies PFP as one of the neo-authoritarian parties that spawned during the presidency of Rodrigo Duterte.

== Organization and structure ==
The party claims to have a total of 1.5 million members nationwide as of September 2024.

=== Party leadership ===
Position	Name
National Chairman	Bongbong Marcos
National Vice-Chairman	Antonio Lagdameo, Jr.
National President	Reynaldo Tamayo Jr.
Executive Vice-President	Benjamin Abalos Jr.
Vice-President for Luzon	Dakila Cua
Vice-President for Visayas	Arthur Defensor Jr.
Vice-President for Mindanao	Nilo Demerey
Secretary-General	Rodolfo Albano III
Deputy Secretary-General	Francis Zamora; Atty. Richard Brett Uy
General Counsel	Atty. George Briones
Treasurer	Henry Villarica
Auditor	Dulce Ann Hofer

=== Party presidents ===
- Jesus "Jayvee" Hinlo Jr. (2018)
- John Castriciones (2018–2019)
- Reynaldo Tamayo Jr. (2019–present)

=== Party chairmen ===
- Abubakar Mangelen (until 2021)
- Bongbong Marcos (2021–present)

== Election results ==
=== Presidential and vice presidential ===
Year	Presidential election				Vice presidential election			
Year	Candidate	Votes	Vote share	Result	Candidate	Votes	Vote share	Result
2022	Ferdinand "Bongbong" Marcos, Jr. (Note: Mangelen wing supported Isko Moreno, and later changed their endorsement to Leni Robredo;)	31,629,783	58.77%	Ferdinand Marcos, Jr. (PFP)	None (Note: Party endorsed candidacy of running mate Sara Duterte from the (Lakas–CMD) won.)			Sara Z. Duterte (Lakas)

=== Legislative elections ===
Congress of the Philippines
House of Representatives					Senate					
Year	Seats won	Votes	Share	Result	Year	Seats won	Votes	Share	Ticket	Result
2019	5 / 304	965,048	2.38%	PDP–Laban majority	2019	0 / 24	1,490,764	0.41%	None	Hugpong ng Pagbabago win 9/12 seats
2022	2 / 316	458,038	0.95%	PDP–Laban majority	2022	Did not field any candidate			UniTeam	UniTeam win 4/12 seats
2025	27 / 317	5,286,538	10.47%	Lakas–CMD plurality	2025	0 / 24	29,680,203	6.93%	Bagong Pilipinas	Bagong Pilipinas win 6/12 seats

== Elected members ==
=== 20th Congress (2025–present) ===
==== National government officials ====
National government officials of PFP in 2025.
Name	Position (Note: When they were members of the party.)	Took office
Bongbong Marcos	President of the Philippines; PFP party chairman	June 30, 2022
Antonio Lagdameo Jr.	Special Assistant to the President; PFP party vice president	June 30, 2022

==== District Representatives ====
District Representatives of PFP in 2025.
Name	District	Took office
Dale Corvera	Agusan Del Norte's at-large congressional district	June 30, 2022
Albee Benitez	Bacolod's at-large congressional district	June 30, 2025
Yusop Alano	Basilan's at-large congressional district	June 30, 2025
Arman Dimaguila	Biñan's at-large congressional district	June 30, 2025
Audrey Zubiri	Bukidnon's 3rd congressional district	June 30, 2025
Mark Violago	Bulacan's 3rd congressional district	June 30, 2025
Linabelle Villarica	Bulacan's 4th congressional district	June 30, 2022
Agatha Cruz	Bulacan's 5th congressional district	June 30, 2025
Salvador Pleyto	Bulacan's 6th congressional district	June 30, 2022
Ramon Nolasco	Cagayan's 1st congressional district	June 30, 2025
Baby Alfonso	Cagayan's 2nd congressional district	June 30, 2022
Lordan Suan	Cagayan de Oro's 1st congressional district	June 30, 2022
Leo Rodriguez	Catanduanes's at-large congressional district	June 30, 2022
Maricar Zamora	Davao de Oro's 1st congressional district	June 30, 2022
Jose Manuel Lagdameo	Davao del Norte's 2nd congressional district	June 30, 2025
Antonio Albano	Isabela's 1st congressional district	June 30, 2019
Ed Christopher Go	Isabela's 2nd congressional district	June 30, 2019
Joseph Tan	Isabela's 4th congressional district	June 30, 2022
Faustino Dy III	Isabela's 6th congressional district	June 30, 2025
Caroline Agyao	Kalinga's at-large congressional district	June 30, 2025
Ann Matibag	Laguna's 1st congressional district	June 30, 2022
Loreto Amante	Laguna's 3rd congressional district	June 30, 2022
Benjamin Agarao Jr.	Laguna's 4th congressional district	June 30, 2025
Imelda Dimaporo	Lanao del Norte's 1st congressional district	June 30, 2025
Junard Chan	Lapu-Lapu City's at-large congressional district	June 30, 2025
Richard Gomez	Leyte's 4th congressional district	June 30, 2022
Esmael Mangudadatu	Maguindanao del Sur's at-large congressional district	June 30, 2025
Miro Quimbo	Marikina's 2nd congressional district	June 30, 2025
Javi Benitez	Negros Occidental's 3rd congressional district	June 30, 2025
Emmanuel Iway	Negros Oriental's 1st congressional district	June 30, 2025
Edwin Ongchuan	Northern Samar's 2nd congressional district	June 30, 2025
Mikaela Suansing	Nueva Ecija's 1st congressional district	June 30, 2022
Kokoy Salvador	Nueva Ecija's 2nd congressional district	June 30, 2025
Jay Vergara	Nueva Ecija's 3rd congressional district	June 30, 2025
Tim Cayton	Nueva Vizcaya's at-large congressional district	June 30, 2025
Odie Tarriela	Oriental Mindoro's 1st congressional district	June 30, 2025
Carmelo Lazatin Jr.	Pampanga's 1st congressional district	June 30, 2025
Ralph Tulfo	Quezon City's 2nd congressional district	June 30, 2022
Patrick Michael Vargas	Quezon City's 5th congressional district	June 30, 2022
Roy Gonzales	Santa Rosa's at-large congressional district	June 30, 2025
Zaldy Villa	Siquijor's at-large congressional district	June 30, 2022
Ed Lumayag	South Cotabato's 1st congressional district	June 30, 2022
Ferdinand Hernandez	South Cotabato's 2nd congressional district	June 30, 2025
Roger Mercado	Southern Leyte's 1st congressional district	June 30, 2025
Bella Suansing	Sultan Kudarat's 2nd congressional district	June 30, 2025
Francisco Matugas	Surigao del Norte's 1st congressional district	June 30, 2025
Alexander Pimentel	Surigao del Sur's 2nd congressional district	June 30, 2025
Cristy Angeles	Tarlac's 2nd congressional district	June 30, 2025
Katrina Reiko Chua-Tai	Zamboanga City's 1st congressional district	June 30, 2025
Marlo Bancoro	Zamboanga Sibugay's 1st congressional district	June 30, 2025
Marly Hofer–Hasim	Zamboanga Sibugay's 2nd congressional district	June 30, 2025

=== Local government officials ===
Local government officials of PFP in 2025
Name	Position
Reynaldo Tamayo Jr.	Governor of South Cotabato (2019–present)
Lucy Torres-Gomez	Mayor of Ormoc (2022–present)
Carmelita Abalos	Mayor of Mandaluyong (2025–present)
Imelda Calixto-Rubiano	Mayor of Pasay (2022–present)
Takit Bersamin	Governor of Abra (2025–present)
Joet Garcia	Governor of Bataan (2022–present)
Jun Aguto	Governor of Batanes (2025–present)
Aris Aumentado	Governor of Bohol (2022–present)
Rogelio Neil Roque	Governor of Bukidnon (2022–present)
Ricarte Padilla	Governor of Camarines Norte (2022–present)
Dorothy Gonzaga	Governor of Davao de Oro (2022–present)
Edwin Jubahib	Governor of Davao del Norte (2019–present)
Franklin Bautista	Governor of Davao Occidental (2022–present)
Nelson Dayanghirang Sr.	Governor of Davao Oriental (2025–present)
Nilo Demerey Jr.	Governor of Dinagat Islands (2022–present)
RV Evardone	Governor of Eastern Samar (2025–present)
Arthur Defensor Jr.	Governor of Iloilo (2019–present)
Rodolfo Albano III	Governor of Isabela (2019–present)
Mario Eduardo Ortega	Governor of La Union (2025–present)
Tucao Mastura	Governor of Maguindanao del Norte (2025–present)
Ali Midtimbang	Governor of Maguindanao del Sur (2022–present)
Bonifacio Lacwasan	Governor of Mountain Province (2016–present)
Chaco Sagarbarria	Governor of Negros Oriental (2023–present)
Jose Gambito	Governor of Nueva Vizcaya (2023–present)
Eduardo Gadiano	Governor of Occidental Mindoro (2019–present)
Dakila Cua	Governor of Quirino (2019–present)
Rogelio Pacquiao	Governor of Sarangani (2022–present)
Jake Vincent Villa	Governor of Siquijor (2022–present)
Damian Mercado	Governor of Southern Leyte (2016–present)
Yshmael Sali	Governor of Tawi-Tawi (2019–present)
Hermogenes Ebdane	Governor of Zambales (2019–present)
Dulce Ann Hofer	Governor of Zamboanga Sibugay (2022–present)
Hadjiman Hataman Salliman	Vice Governor of Basilan (2025–present)
Arthur Pingoy Jr.	Vice Governor of South Cotabato (2022–present)

=== Others ===
- Manny Pacquiao - former senator
- Edcel Greco Lagman - governor of Albay (2022–2025)
- Christian Noveras - former governor of Aurora (2022–2024)
- Marilou Cayco - former governor of Batanes (2016–2025)
- Niño Uy - former governor of Davao Oriental (2023–2025)
- Ben Evardone - former governor of Eastern Samar (2019–2025)
- ER Ejercito – former governor of Laguna (2010–2014)
- Abdulraof Macacua - former governor of Maguindanao del Norte (2022–2025)
- Presbitero Velasco, Jr. - former governor of Marinduque (2019–2025)
- Jose Riano - former governor of Romblon (2019–2025)
- Victor Yu - former governor of Zamboanga del Sur (2019–2025)
- Imelda Papin – former vice governor of Camarines Sur (2019–2022)
- Benglen Ecleo - former vice governor of Dinagat Islands (2022–2025)
- Jocel Baac - former vice governor of Kalinga (2022–2025)
- Katherine Agapay - former vice governor of Laguna (2016–2025)
- Reynaldo San Juan Jr. - vice governor of Rizal (2016–2025)
- Jose Maria Zubiri Jr. – former Representative for Bukidnon's 3rd district (1987–1998, 2022–2025)
- Joseph Kris Benjamin Agarao – Board Member for Laguna's 4th district (2010–2019, since 2022)
- Wilfredo Bejasa Jr. – Board Member for Laguna's 1st district (since 2022), City Councilor of Biñan (2016–2022)
- Andres "Andy" D. Lacson - former mayor of Concepcion, Tarlac
- Rey Malonzo - former mayor of Caloocan City
- Benjamin Abalos Sr. - former mayor of Mandaluyong (2022–2025)
- Michelle Nakpil Rabat - former mayor of Mati City (2019–2025)

== See also ==
- Federalism in the Philippines
- Federalism and Rodrigo Duterte

Federalist parties in the Philippines:
- Hugpong sa Tawong Lungsod
- Lakas–CMD
- Partido Demokratiko Pilipino
- Pederalismo ng Dugong Dakilang Samahan
- UniTeam
