= Federalism in the Philippines =

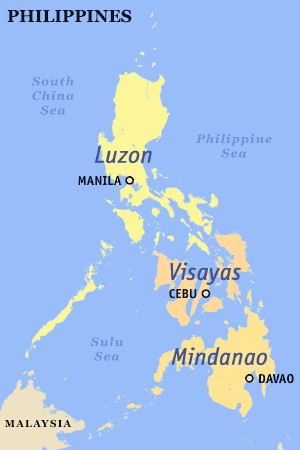
Emilio Aguinaldo and Apolinario Mabini intended the Philippines to be divided into three federal states, Luzon, the Visayas and Mindanao. Above is a map that shows the areas generally regarded as Luzon, Visayas, Mindanao and may not match the proposed set-up of a federal government under the Aguinaldo–Mabini proposal.

Federalism in the Philippines (Filipino: Pederalismo sa Pilipinas) refers to political movements in the Philippines that are variants of federalism. Federalism has grown in popularity among Filipinos in recent decades, with multiple political candidates successfully campaigning on federalism-based platforms. In 2022, Bongbong Marcos won the Philippine presidential election as a member of the pro-federalist Partido Federal ng Pilipinas (PFP).

== History ==
The concept of a federal government for the Philippines was first suggested by José Rizal. He outlined his vision of federalist governance on his essay Filipinas dentro de cien años ("The Philippines a Century Hence") that was published by the Barcelona-based propaganda paper La Solidaridad in 1889.

In 1899, Filipino revolutionaries Emilio Aguinaldo and Apolinario Mabini also suggested dividing the islands into three federal states. The Federal State of the Visayas was established as a proposed administrative unit under a federal form of government but was abolished a year later by Aguinaldo's central government in Malolos.

One of the first proponents of federalism in the Philippines in the 21st century is professor Jose Abueva from the University of the Philippines who argued that a federal form of government is necessary to more efficiently cater to the needs of the country despite its diversity. The primary goals of a constitutional amendment is to increase decentralization, greater local power and access to resources most especially among regions outside Metro Manila which has long been dubbed as rather imperial.

Aside from Abueva, senator Aquilino Pimentel Jr. was a prominent supporter of federalism who, beginning in 2001, advocated for federalism. He saw the proposed system as a key component in alleviating the Mindanao crisis and appeasing Moro insurgents. According to Pimentel, even though federalism was never intended to appease any followers of any specific ideology of religion, it will also hasten economic development, since resource and financial mobilization is upon each state's or province's discretion without significant constraint from the central government.

However, in 2009, after Senate and House resolutions supporting charter change were released, an estimated 13,000 to 15,000 people gathered in Makati to protest against these executive department-deriving proposals for constitutional reform. This was due to speculations that Philippine president Gloria Macapagal Arroyo would use such amendments to extend her hold in office. In addition, Pulse Asia published in the same year their survey regarding public support for the proposed charter change; the survey reported that four out of ten Filipino adults, or 42% of all respondents, opposed the amendment, with 25% still undecided and 33% in favor. Pulse Asia furthered that from 2006 to 2009 there was no significant change of sentiment against the charter change proposal, although indecision increased by 6%.

In late 2014, then-Davao City mayor Rodrigo Duterte launched a nationwide campaign calling for a charter change for federalism. During his visit to Cebu City in October of the same year, Duterte stated that federalism will facilitate better delivery of services to the people. He also saw the current system as "antiquated" where distribution of public funds is disproportionately biased towards Metro Manila. Aside from the economic aspect, federalism is also seen as the best means to address problems in Mindanao which suffers the most from ethno-religious conflicts. Duterte added that the current unitary form of government has not worked well given the ethnic diversity in the country. In spite of initially rejecting several calls for his candidacy for the 2016 presidential elections, he cited his organizational reforms if he were to become president. Parallel to his campaign for federalism, Duterte planned to privatize tax collection and abolish the Congress to make way for a unicameral legislature, contrary to the originally proposed Joint Resolution No. 10.

Movements for federalism further intensified from when the draft of the Bangsamoro Basic Law was submitted by Philippine president Benigno Aquino III to the 16th Congress on September 10, 2014. From approval, this law establishes the Bangsamoro as an autonomous region with its own parliamentary government and police force. Approval of the Bangsamoro structure would provide federalism proponents and supporters added confidence to clamor for the national government to enact reforms towards a more decentralized system for the rest of the country.

In May 2016, President-elect Rodrigo Duterte stated that a plebiscite on the proposed replacement of the unitary state with a federal one will be held in two years. On December 7, 2016, Duterte signed Executive Order No. 10 creating a consultative committee to review the 1987 Constitution.

== Initiatives ==
=== Under President Gloria Macapagal Arroyo ===
==== Joint Resolution No. 10 ====
The resolution may require the revision of 14 of the 18 Articles of the 1987 Philippine Constitution and the addition of two new articles. It sought to adopt a federal and presidential form of government with a bicameral legislature. This proposed resolution was backed by 12 senators of the Philippines: Aquilino Pimentel Jr., Edgardo Angara, Rodolfo Biazon, Pia Cayetano, Juan Ponce Enrile, Francis Escudero, Jinggoy Estrada, Gregorio Honasan, Panfilo Lacson, Francis Pangilinan, Ramon Revilla Jr. and Manuel Villar. Arroyo for a shift to this system in her later state of the nation address.

In 2008, senator Aquilino Pimentel Jr. proposed Joint Resolution No. 10, which would revise the current 1987 constitution and have created eleven autonomous regions out of the Philippine Republic, establishing eleven centers of finance and development in the archipelago.

The proposal would result in the creation of eleven "states" and one federal administrative region.

Proposed designations, capitals, and geographic extents (2008)
States (11)
Letter	State	Capital
A	Northern Luzon	Tuguegarao
B	Central Luzon	San Fernando, Pampanga
C	Southern Tagalog	Tagaytay
D	Minparom	Mamburao
E	Bicol	Legazpi
F	Eastern Visayas	Catbalogan
G	Central Visayas	Toledo
H	Western Visayas	Iloilo City
I	Northern Mindanao	Cagayan de Oro
J	Southern Mindanao	Davao City
K	BangsaMoro	Marawi
Other (1)
Letter	Federal Administrative Region	
M	Metro Manila	

Within the joint resolution are certain proposals such as election of senators based on states, senators representing overseas voters and the state governor and vice-governor as one team. The Judicial and Bar Council which screens nominees to the judiciary would be abolished. Geographic locations of the three branches of the government would also be reconsidered. In the proposal, the legislative department would be transferred to what would become the State of Central Visayas while the judicial department would be moved somewhere within the State of Northern Luzon. The executive department would remain within the federal administrative region of Metro Manila.

==== House Concurrent Resolution No. 15 ====
Rep. Monico Puentevella on May 7, 2008, filed House Concurrent Resolution No. 15 which supported Senate Resolution No. 10 backed by 16 senators. Unlike the Nene Pimentel Senate Resolution, Puentevella included the option of holding a constitutional convention, but excluded the People's Initiative mode. Prospero Nograles, a self-proclaimed advocate of federalism, on May 1, 2008, announced: "This federal system of government is close to my heart as a Mindanaoan leader and I'm sure most of the leaders in Mindanao will agree that we have long clamored for it. Senate Resolution 10 is a pleasant surprise because the Senate has a long history of opposing any move to amend the Constitution." The joint Senate resolution called for the creation of 11 federal states in the country, by convening of Congress "into a constituent assembly for the purpose of revising the Constitution to establish a federal system of government."

=== Under President Rodrigo Duterte ===
President Rodrigo Duterte has pushed for the adoption of a federal system of government for the Philippines, which was one of his campaign promises when he ran for president in 2016.

Duterte issued Executive Order No. 10 which created the 25-member Consultative Committee (ConCom) on December 7, 2016 for the review of the 1987 Constitution. Duterte appointed the first 22 members of the committee in January 24, 2018. The ConCom submitted its first federal constitution draft on July 9, 2018. The draft underwent several changes with the newer versions criticized; such as for omitting provisions which serves as safeguard against political dynasties and turncoatism, provisions on federated regions, and the removal of the position of Vice President.

In 2018, surveys showed a lack of awareness on federalism was attributed to the lack of support for the campaign by the public. As of August 2020, the Duterte administration was still pursuing the shift to federalism and was considering three options to accomplish this; by amending the 1987 Constitution through Constitutional Convention (Con-Con), Constituent Assembly (Con-Ass), or people's initiative.

== Opinion polling ==
A March 2018 Pulse Asia poll reported that 27% of Filipinos supported a federal government in the Philippines, while 66% expressed opposition and 6% were unsure. Another poll by Social Weather Stations in early 2018 showed that 75% were unaware of federalism as a form of government and 25% said they were aware; among respondents, 37% supported federalism, 29% opposed it, and 34% were unsure.

== See also ==
- Proposed federal states of the Philippines
- Federal State of the Visayas
- Bangsamoro
- Cordillera autonomy movement
