= Babae... Sa Likod ng Salamin =

1976 Filipino drama film

- Directed by: Cesar J. Amigo
- Written by: Reuben R. Canoy; Cesar J. Amigo
- Produced by: Reuben R. Canoy
- Starring: Charito Solis; Dindo Fernando; Alona Alegre; Perla Bautista
- Cinematography: Rudy Diño
- Music by: Willy Cruz
- Production company: Rueben Canoy Productions
- Release date: June 23, 1976
- Country: Philippines
- Language: Filipino

Babae... Sa Likod ng Salamin (lit. 'Lady... behind the mirror') is a 1976 Filipino drama film directed by Cesar J. Amigo from a script by Amigo and producer Reuben Canoy. Starring Charito Solis, Dindo Fernando, Alona Alegre and Perla Bautista, it is about a woman with two personas: Laura, a faithful wife in the day, and Lorna, a mistress of another at night. The film was released in June 1976, and was the penultimate film written or directed by Amigo.

Critic Justino Dormiendo gave Babae... a negative review, expressing disappointment in the film's standard quality "sex drama" despite the talented cast and the involvement of accomplished writers Amigo and Canoy.

== Cast ==
- Charito Solis as Laura / Lorna
- Dindo Fernando
- Alona Alegre
- Perla Bautista
- Teddy Yabut
- Ward Luarca
- Joe Cantada
- Tony Santos Sr.
- Lauro Delgado
- Fr. Ben Carreon
- Jim Fernandez

== Production ==
=== Background ===
Reuben Canoy, a writer and former mayor of Cagayan de Oro, was a supporter of the Marcos administration until 1976 when he defected to the opposition.

=== Music ===
The film's theme song, titled "Babae....Sa Likod ng Salamin", was written by Willy Cruz and writer Rolando Tinio and sung by Celeste Legaspi.

== Release ==
=== Critical reception ===
Justino M. Dormiendo, writing for Sagisag, gave Babae... Sa Likod ng Salamin a negative review. Having expressed high expectations for a film made by Cesar J. Amigo, a multiple FAMAS Award winner, and Reuben Canoy with the involvement of a talented cast, he expressed disappointment in the overall quality of the film, stating that "this has no difference from the numerous sex dramas being sold in the market. In reality, the story is not credible."
