= Camp Evangelista =

Philippine military base in Cagayan de Oro

- Cagayan de Oro, Philippines

Site information
- Type: Military base
- Owner: Philippines
- Controlled by: Philippine Army

Location
- Location in Mindanao Location in the Philippines
- Coordinates: 8°29′20.7″N 124°37′23.4″E

Site history
- Battles/wars: World War II; 1990 Mindanao crisis Moro conflict

Garrison information
- Garrison: 4th Infantry Division

Camp Edilberto Evangelista is a military installation of the Philippine Army in Cagayan de Oro, Philippines.

== Background ==
Camp Edilberto Evangelista is a military base of the Philippine Army, and houses the 4th Infantry Division. It is situated in Barangay Patag in Cagayan de Oro and with an area of 129 hectares (320 acres) is the largest military camp in Mindanao. Its scope includes Northern Mindanao and Caraga regions. The camp hosts the Camp Evangelista Station Hospital. The camp is named after Manila-native and civil engineer Edilberto Evangelista.

== Establishment ==
The land where Camp Evangelista stands would be reserved for use of the Philippine Army way back on March 31, 1938, when President Manuel L. Quezon through Proclamation No. 265. The camp was initially referred to as Camp Bulua and adopted its current name in 1940.

== During the Marcos dictatorship ==
During the Marcos dictatorship, Camp Evangelista was designated as one of the four provincial camps to become a Regional Command for Detainees (RECAD). It was designated RECAD IV, housing prisoners from throughout Mindanao.

Amnesty International, which documented human rights violations cases and the situation of political detainees during the time, called particular attention to the case of Pastor Romeo O. Buenavidez, a United Church of Christ in the Philippines (UCCP) minister, who was beaten up in various safehouses in August 1981 and then brought to Camp Evangelista where he was forced to sign a waiver indicating he had been "well treated" during his "questioning." Results of later medical examinations showed medical findings matching the beatings he described. A case was filed against the officer and soldiers involved but there had been no updates by the time Amnesty International filed its report.

== 1990 Mindanao crisis ==
Camp Evangelista was seized by Col. Alexander Noble, a mutineer, during the 1990 Mindanao crisis.

== Recent history ==
In the 2017 Marawi siege, the camp would serve as a hub for munitions and equipment sourced from Manila.

On July 12, 2022, a fire and explosion hit the ammunition depot at the camp injuring three civilians The incident renewed calls to move the camp.

=== 2023 shooting ===
On February 11, 2023, a mass shooting occurred inside Camp Evangelista. Five people died in the incident, including the perpetrator, Private Johmar Villabito. One other was injured. The shooting occurred at around 1:10 am (UTC+8) at the barracks of the 4th Infantry Division's (4ID) Service Support Battalion (SSBn) in Camp Edilberto Evangelista. Villabito, using his own government-issued M16A2, opened fire on his fellow soldiers. He engaged with two other personnel in a gunfight, and one of the two killed Villabito in an act of self defense. The victims held the rank of sergeant, corporal, private first class, and private.

Philippine Army chief Romeo Brawner Jr. had visited the camp earlier in the month expressing concern on the rising incidence of post-traumatic stress disorder among soldiers. The Philippine Army and the Philippine National Police opened a joint investigation to figure the motive of the shooter. The 4ID also conducted its own internal investigation. The Army also is looking into possible deficiencies in its recruitment and training process to avoid a similar incident in the future.
