= Federal Republic of Mindanao =

Unrecognized breakaway state, 1986

- 1986
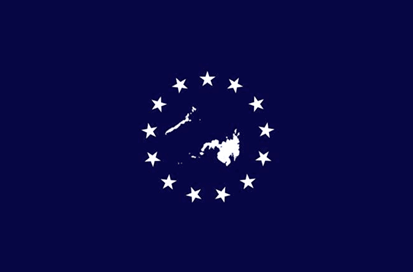
- Flag
- Anthem: Mindanao, Land of Promise and Security
- Map showing the claimed areas of the proposed republic in red. Rest of the territory of the Philippines highlighted in gray
- Status: Unrecognized state
- Capital: Davao City; Administrative Center (de jure & partial proposal); Marawi City; Capital de facto (Partial proposal)
- Largest city: Davao City
- Common languages: Cebuano; Cuyonon; Hiligaynon; Maguindanaon; Maranao; Tausug
- Religion: Catholic Church; Islam
- Government: Federation
- Currency: Philippine peso Mindanao dollar (proposed, never issued)

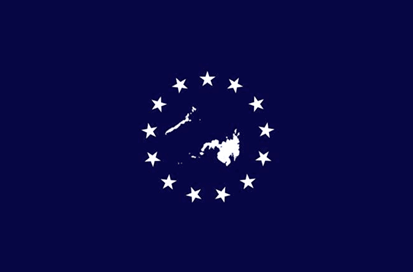
Proposed flags of the Federal Republic of Mindanao; left (1986) Middle (1990) Right left (1986)

The Federal Republic of Mindanao was a short-lived, self-proclaimed, unrecognized breakaway state encompassing Mindanao, Palawan and the Sulu Archipelago of the Philippines. The independence of the republic was to be proclaimed at a convention in Cagayan de Oro on April 25, 1986, by the Mindanao People's Democratic Movement led by Reuben Canoy but original plans to proclaim the proposed republic's independence were changed to avert arrest by the Corazon Aquino administration due to violation against sedition law. A 31-paged constitution was signed as a move to declare intent to proclaim an independent federal state and the flag of the proposed state was raised. Mindanao, Land of Promise and Security, is the proposed national anthem by the proposed country's proponents.

Reuben Canoy, leader of the Mindanao People's Democratic Movement and former presidential candidate had an averted plan to declare the Federal Republic of Mindanao in 1986. Four years later, the 1990 Mindanao crisis arose where Col. Alexander Noble led a mutiny and proclaimed an independent Federal Republic of Mindanao. Noble along with Canoy, who is also involved as a civilian supporter, was arrested by government authorities but claimed that his effort was successful since it brought into attention issues affecting Mindanao.
