= 4th Infantry Division (Philippines) =

Fourth Infantry Division
- Active: January 15, 1946 – Present
- Country: Philippines
- Branch: Philippine Army
- Type: Infantry
- Role: Conventional Warfare, Anti-Guerrilla Operations
- Size: 3 Brigades
- Part of: Philippine Army (Since 1946)
- Garrison/HQ: Camp BGen Edilberto Evangelista, Cagayan de Oro
- Nickname: Diamond Division
- Patron: St. Ignatius of Loyola
- Mascot: Diamond
- Anniversaries: January 15; March 22 (Philippine Army foundation day)
- Engagements: Communist Insurgency in the Philippines; Anti-guerilla operations against the NPA

Commanders
- Current commander: MGen Marion T. Angcao AFP
- Notable commanders: Brigadier General Juan B. Cruz; BGen Florencio G. Palacios; Bgen Antonio M. Venadas; Bgen Alfonso Alcoseba; BGen Angelo C. Queding; BG Tirso Fajardo, AFP; BG Patricio Borromeo AFP; BG Ramon Aguire AFP; BG Climaco Pintoy AFP; BG Benjamin Molina AFP; BG Manuel Mandac AFP; BG Rigoberto Atienza AFP; Brigadier General Rogelio F. Villanueva; Brigadier General Miguel Sol; Brigadier General Antonio Nale; MG Oscar T. Lactao AFP; MG Roy Cimatu AFP; MG Cardozo Luna AFP; Major General Jose Barbieto; MGen. Ricardo David; MGen. Mario F. Chan; Major General Victor Felix; MGen Benjamin Madrigal Jr. MGen Nestor Anonuevo; MGen Ricardo Visaya; MGen Ronald Villanueva; Maj. Gen. Franco Nemesio M. Gacal; MGen Andres Centino; BG Romeo Brawner Jr. MGen Wilbur C. Mamawag; MGen Jose Maria R. Cuerpo II; BGen Consolito P. Yecla; MGen Michele B. Anayron Jr.

Insignia
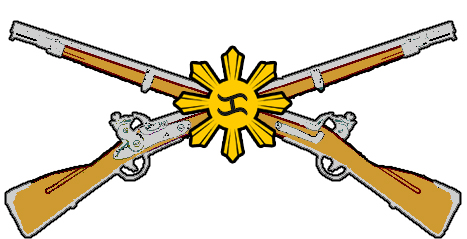
- Armed Forces Occupational Specialty Insignia

The 4th Infantry Division, Philippine Army, known officially as the Diamond Division, is one of the Philippine Army's infantry units in Northern Mindanao.

== History ==
On January 15, 1946, right after the World War II, upon the reestablishment of the Commonwealth Government, all Military Districts were converted to military areas; Pursuant to Section 1 General Orders Number 46 of HAFP dated January 8, 1946. The 1st and 2nd Military Areas (IMA-IIMA) was in Luzon, while 3rd Military Area (IIIMA) in the Visayas, and the 4th Military Area (IVMA) in Mindanao. The remaining forces of the 10th MD were absorbed to Military Police Command (MPC) based at Camp Overton, Iligan.

== Mission ==
4th Infantry (Diamond) Division conducts internal security operations to dismantle four (4) priority New People's Army fronts and degrade three (3) priority New People's Army areas in Caraga region and portion of Region 10 by 2009 to attain a physically and psychologically secure environment conducive to continuous development.

== Current line units ==
=== Brigades ===
- 401st Infantry (UNITY) Brigade (Prosperidad, Agusan Del Sur)
- 402nd Infantry (STINGERS) Brigade (Butuan City, Agusan Del Norte)
- 403rd Infantry (PEACEMAKER) Brigade (Malaybalay, Bukidnon)

=== Battalions ===
- 8th Infantry (DEPENDABLE) Battalion
- 23rd Infantry (MASIGASIG) Battalion
- 29th Infantry (MATATAG) Battalion
- 30th Infantry (PYTHON) Battalion
- 36th Infantry (del fierro VALOR) Battalion
- 26th Infantry (EVER ONWARD) Battalion
- 58th Infantry (DIMALULUPIG) Battalion
- 75th Infantry (MARAUDER) Battalion
- 88th Infantry (MARINGAL) Battalion

=== Service Support Units (SSU) ===
- Camp Evangelista Station Hospital (CESH)
- Headquarters and Headquarters Service Battalion (HHSBn)
- Service Support Battalion (SSBn)
- 4th Division Training School (4DTS)
- 4th Army Training Unit (4ATG)
- 4th Field Artillery Battalion (4FAB)
- Civil Military Operations Battalion (CMOBn)
- 10th Forward Service Support Unit, ASCOM, PA (10FSSU)

== See also ==
- Armed Forces of the Philippines
- Philippine Army
- AFP Eastern Mindanao Command
- Edilberto Evangelista
