= Julio C. Teehankee =

Filipino political scientist

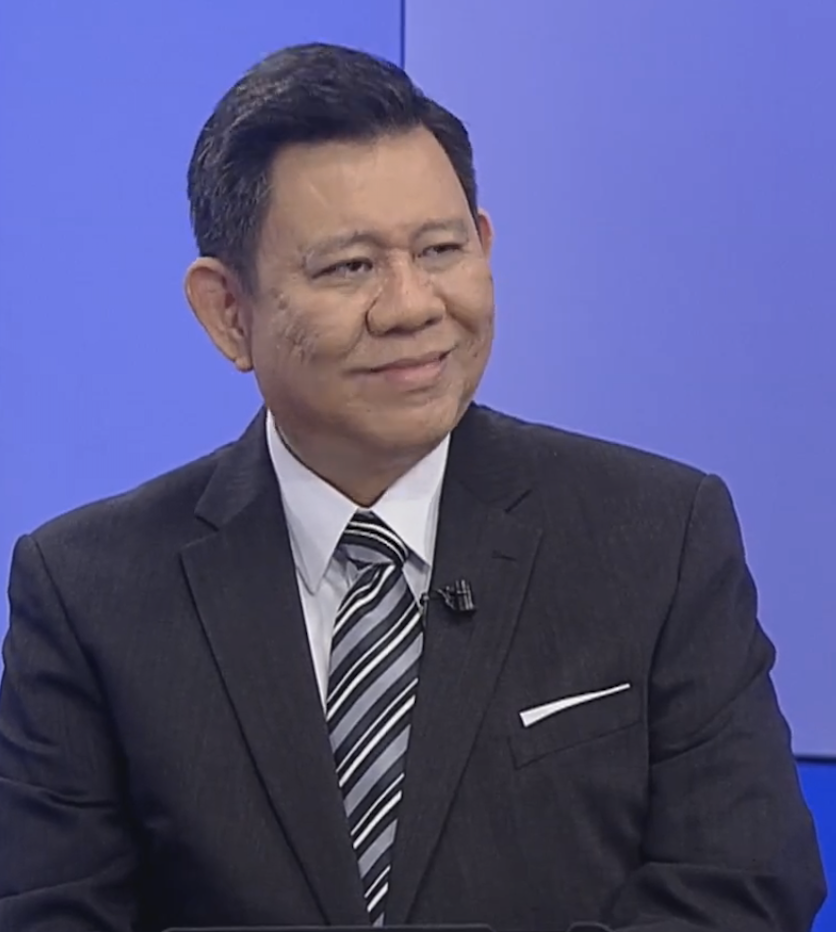
- Julio C. Teehankee in 2019
- Born: Julio Cabral Teehankee
- Occupation: Educator
- Spouse: Rosa Babel Calilung
- Relatives: Claudio Teehankee (uncle)

Academic background
- Education: De La Salle University (AB, PhD); University of the Philippines Diliman (MA)

Julio Cabral Teehankee is a Filipino political scientist and a prominent political analyst focused on Philippine politics and democracy issues. He is full professor of political science and international studies at De La Salle University (DLSU) where he served as chair of the Political Science Department (1994–2007); chair of the International Studies Department (2008–2013); and dean of the College of Liberal Arts (2013–2017). He was the first Southeast Asian to be elected to the Executive Committee of the International Political Science Association (IPSA), an international scholarly association founded under the auspices of UNESCO in 1949.

He continuously aims to bridge theory and practice in academic and other professional endeavors. Aside from teaching and research, he has served as political and policy consultant to government officials, electoral candidates, political parties, national and international organizations.

Teehankee specializes in the comparative analysis and development of East and Southeast Asia, with particular focus on elections, party politics, democratization and governance. He has published papers on elections, party politics, and political dynasties in the Philippines, Japan and Southeast Asia.

He has been cited as one of only four political scientists in the 2015 Webometrics' List of 150 Top Scientists in the Philippines based on Google Scholar citations. His research works have been indexed in Scopus and Web of Science-Social Sciences Citation Index. He was co-editor of Building Inclusive Democracies in ASEAN, a recipient of the 2016 National Academy of Science and Technology (NAST) Outstanding Book Award. He was also a recipient of the NAST Outstanding Book award in 2024 for Patronage Democracy in the Philippines: Clans, Clients, and Competition in Local Elections, published by the Ateneo de Manila University Press.

Teehankee has been quoted by The New York Times, The Washington Post, and The Economist. His political commentaries have been published by the East Asia Forum, New Mandala, and Asia Dialogue. He has appeared regularly on media as a political analyst.

== Early life and education ==
Julio Teehankee was born to a distinguished family with deep roots in the Philippines. His paternal grandfather, José Tee Han Kee, immigrated to the Philippines in 1901 from Amoy (now Xiamen), China and became the first medical director of the Chinese General Hospital in Manila. Julio's uncle, Claudio Teehankee, served as the 16th Chief Justice of the Supreme Court of the Philippines.

Julio Teehankee completed his elementary education at the Ateneo de Manila University from 1972 to 1980. He attended high school at La Salle Greenhills from 1980 to 1984. He obtained his bachelor's degree majoring in Political Science (1988) and his doctorate degree in Development Studies (with distinction in 2001) from De La Salle University. He earned his master's degree in Political Science (1994) from the University of the Philippines Diliman. From 2007 to 2008, he completed his postdoctoral studies at the Graduate Schools of Law and Politics at the University of Tokyo under a Japan Foundation fellowship. He does not hold any degree from outside of the Philippines.

== Visiting fellowships ==
Julio Teehankee was a visiting fellow at Saw Swee Hock Southeast Asia Centre, London School of Economics and Political Science, United Kingdom in 2022. Previously, he was a visiting fellow at the Philippines Project of the Center for Southeast Asian Studies, Kyoto University, Japan in 2020; at the School of Regulation and Global Governance, College of Asia and the Pacific, Australian National University in 2019; at the Southeast Asia Research Centre, City University of Hong Kong in 2018; at the Osaka School of International Public Policy, Osaka University in 2015; at the Japan Institute for International Affairs in 2002; a Sumitomo Foundation research grantee at the Waseda Institute of Asia Pacific Studies, Waseda University in 2000; a Fulbright American Studies fellow at Southern Illinois University at Carbondale in 2000; and, a Japan Foundation faculty development grantee at Ibaraki University, Japan from July 1995 to July 1996.

== Major publications ==
=== Books ===
- The Narrative Trap: The Paradox of the Philippine Presidency, co-authored with Mark R. Thompson [forthcoming]
- Interregnum: Philippine Progressive and Reform Politics in an Age of Authoritarian Nostalgia. Pasig City: Friedrich Ebert Stiftung [2026]
- Mass-Elite Discrepancies in Philippine Politics, co-edited with Rosalie Arcala Hall, Abingdon, Oxon: Routledge [forthcoming]
- More Political Than We Admit: Volume 3: Discourse, Movements, and Resistance, Quezon City: Vibal [forthcoming]
- More Political Than We Admit: Volume 2: The State and Its Discontents, Quezon City: Vibal [forthcoming]
- More Political Than We Admit: Theories and the Problematic of Philippine Politics, Quezon City: Vibal, 2024.
- Rethinking Parties in Democratizing Asia, co-edited with Christian Echle, Abingdon, Oxon: Routledge, 2023.
- Patronage Democracy in the Philippines: Clans, Clients, and Competition in Local Elections, co-edited with Cleo Calimbahin, Quezon City: Ateneo de Manila University Press/Bughaw, 2022. (2024 National Academy of Science and Technology Outstanding Book Award)
- Debate on Federal Philippines, co-edited with Eduardo Araral, Gilberto Llanto, Jonathan Malaya, and Ronald Mendoza, Quezon City: Ateneo de Manila University Press/Bughaw, 2017.
- Building Inclusive Democracies in ASEAN, co-edited with Ronald Mendoza, Edsel Beja Jr., Antonio La Viña, and Maria Villamejor-Mendoza, Mandaluyong: Anvil Publishing Inc., 2015. (2016 National Academy of Science and Technology Outstanding Book Award)
- Rethinking Japan’s Foreign Policy: State, Society, and Security. Manila: Yuchengco Center for East Asia, 2002.
- Japanese Party Politics and Governance in Transition. Manila: Yuchengco Center for East Asia, 2002.

=== Book chapters ===
- “Anti-Party and Apartisan Attitudes in Southeast Asia: On Ordinary Citizens, Political Parties and Leadership,” co-authored with Anthony Lawrence Borja, in Lise Storm De Gruyter (Ed.) Handbook of Political Parties of the Global South, 311-339, Berlin: De Guyter [forthcoming]
- “Pandemic Populism Amid Weak State Capacity in the Philippines.” In Rachel M. Gisselquist and Andrea Vaccaro (Eds) How States Respond to Crisis: Pandemic Governance Across the Global South, Oxford: Oxford University Press, 2025, 81-104.
- “An Anarchy of Parties: The Pitfalls of the Presidential-based Party System in the Philippines.” In Thomas Poguntke and Wilhelm Hofmeister (Eds.) Political Parties and the Crisis of Democracy, Oxford: Oxford University Press, 2024, 467-485.
- “State-Market Dynamics and the Historical Dominance of San Miguel in the Philippine Beer Industry,” co-authored with Eric C. Batalla, in Paul Chambers and Nithi Nuangjamnong (Eds.) Beer in East Asia: A Political Economy, Abingdon, Oxon: Routledge, 2023, 106-138.
- “The Legacy of the Kilusang Bagong Lipunan: Authoritarian Contamination in Philippine Party Politics.” In Edilberto C. De Jesus and Ivyrose S. Baysic (Eds) Martial Law in the Philippines: Lessons and Legacies, Quezon City: Ateneo de Manila University Press, 2023, 221-246. .
- "Introduction: Taking a Second Look at Asian Political Parties,” co-authored with Rey Padit, and Joong Hun Park, in Julio C. Teehankee and Christian Echle (Eds.) Rethinking Parties in Democratizing Asia. Abingdon, Oxon: Routledge, 2023, 1-25.
- “Conclusion: Movements, Parties, and Asian Democracies Against the Odds.” In Teehankee, J. C. and Echle, C. (Eds) Rethinking Parties in Democratizing Asia. Abingdon, Oxon: Routledge, 2023, 219-230.
- “Case Study of Philippines,” co-authored with Carmel V. Abao, in Wilhelm Hofmeister and Peter Köppinger (Eds) Political Parties and Civil Society: The Need for Stronger Linkages to Defend and Promote Democracy, Brussels: European Network of Political Foundations, 2022, 42-63.
- “Dissecting Patronage Politics in the Philippines.” In Julio C. Teehankee and Cleo A. Calimbahin (Eds.) Patronage Democracy in the Philippines: Clans, Clients, and Machines in Local Politics, Quezon City: Ateneo de Manila University Press/Bughaw, 2022, 1-37.
- “City of Manila: Political Brokerage in Urban Mayoral Elections,” co-authored with Louie C. Montemar, in Julio C. Teehankee and Cleo A. Calimbahin (Eds.) Patronage Democracy in the Philippines: Clans, Clients, and Machines in Local Politics. Quezon City: Ateneo de Manila University Press/Bughaw 2022, 64-100.
- “Untangling the Party List System.” In Hutchcroft P. (Ed.) Strong Patronage, Weak Parties: The Case for Electoral Reform in the Philippines. Mandaluyong: Anvil Publishing Inc., 2019, 145-161.
- "Accountability Challenges to Sustainable Development Goals in Southeast Asia.” In Holzhacker, R. and Agussalim, D. (Eds.), Sustainable Development Goals in Southeast Asia and ASEAN. Singapore: Brill, 2019, 79-97.
- “House of Clans: Political Dynasties in the Philippine Legislature.” In Mark R. Thompson and Eric C. Batalla (Eds.) Routledge Handbook of Contemporary Philippines. London and New York: Routledge., 2018, 85-96.
- “Strengthening the Party List System as a List Proportional Representation Election System.” In Malaya, J. (Ed.). The Quest for a Federal Philippines, 110-122. Pasay: PDP Laban Federalism Institute., 2017, 98-110.
- “Rationale and Features of Federalism.” In Araral, E. et al. Debate on Federal Philippines, Quezon City: Ateneo de Manila University Press/Bughaw, 2017, 9-44.
- “Was Duterte’s Rise Inevitable?” In Curato, N. (Ed.) A Duterte Reader: Critical Essays on Rodrigo Duterte’s Early Presidency. Quezon City: Ateneo de Manila University Press/Bughaw., 2017, 39-58.
- “Institutionalizing Political Party Reforms in the Philippines.” In Mendoza, R.U., Beja, E.L. Jr., Teehankee, J.C. La Viña, A.G.M., and Villamejor-Mendoza, M.F.V. (Eds.) Building Inclusive Democracies in ASEAN. Mandaluyong: Anvil Publishing Inc., 2015, 308-318.
- “The Philippines” in Jean Blondel, Takashi Inoguchi, and Ian Mars (Eds.) Political Parties and Democracy: Western Europe, East and Southeast Asia 1990-2010. Basingstoke, Hampshire: Palgrave Macmillan, 2012, 187-205.
- “Clientelism and Party Politics in the Philippines,” in Dirk Tomsa, D. and Andreas Ufen(Eds.) Clientelism and Electoral Competition in Indonesia, Thailand and the Philippines. Oxford, UK: Routledge, 2012, 186-214.
- “Been There, Done That: Southeast Asian Response to the Global Financial Crisis?" In Global Financial Crisis and Its Impacts on Asia. Seoul, Korea: Konrad Adenauer Stiftung, 2010, 39-67.
- “Image, Issues and Machinery: Presidential Campaigns in Post-1986 Philippines," In Yuko Kasuya and Nathan Quimpo (Eds.). The Politics of Change in the Philippines. Manila: Anvil, 2010, 114-161.
- “Citizen-Party Linkages: Failure to Connect?” In Herberg, M. (Ed.) Reforming the Philippine Party System: Ideas and Initiatives, Debates and Dynamics. Pasig: Friedrich Ebert Stiftung, 2009, 23-44.
- “Consolidation or Crisis of Clientelistic Democracy? The 2004 Synchronized Elections in the Philippines,” in Croissant, A. & Martin, B. (Eds.), Between Consolidation and Crisis: Elections and Democracy in Five Nations in Southeast Asia. Berlin: Lit Verlag, 2006, 215-276.
- “Election Campaigning in the Philippines," in Schafferer, C. (Ed.) Election Campaigning in East and Southeast Asia. Aldershot: Ashgate, 2005, 79-101.
- “Electoral Politics in the Philippines,” in Croissant, A., Bruns, G., & John, M (Eds.), Electoral Politics in Southeast & East Asia. Singapore: Friedrich Ebert Stiftung, 2002, 149-202.

=== Journal articles ===
- “Legitimacy and Hybrid Peace Governance in Post-Conflict Societies: The Challenges of Muslim Mindanao, Philippines,” co-authored with Kevin Agojo Journal of International Peacekeeping Volume 28, 2025, 105-127
- “Post-conflict Party-building in Southern Philippines: The Promise and Perils of Institutional Re-engineering in the Bangsamoro Autonomous Region in Muslim Mindanao,” Policy Studies, 2025, 1-27.
- “Introduction: Political Dynasties in Asia,” co-authored with Paul W. Chambers and Christian Echle, Asian Journal of Comparative Political Science Volume 8 (3), 2023, 765-786.
- “Interrogating the Links Between Dynasties and Development in the Philippines,” co-authored with Ronald U. Mendoza, Gabrielle Ann S. Mendoza, Philip Arnold P. Tuaño, and Jurel Yap, Asian Journal of Comparative Political Science Volume 8 (3), 2023, 661-670.
- “Politics of Ideas and Discourses: Understanding the Ideational and Discursive Struggles in the Formation of the Bangsamoro Autonomous Region in Muslim Mindanao,” co-authored with Kevin Agojo, Asia Pacific Social Science Review Volume 23 (2), 2023, 1-13.
- “Pandemic Politics in the Philippines: An Introduction from the Special Issue Editors,” co-authored with Francisco A. Magno, Philippine Political Science Journal Volume 43, 2022, 107-122.
- “The Philippines in 2021: Twilight of the Duterte Presidency.” Asian Survey Volume 62 (1), 2022, 126-136.
- "Duterte’s Populism and the 2019 Midterm Election: An Anarchy of Parties?” co-authored with Yuko Kasuya, Philippine Political Science Journal Volume 41 2020, 106-126..
- “Factional Dynamics in Philippine Party Politics, 1900-2019,” Journal of Contemporary Southeast Asian Affairs, Volume 39 (1), 2020, 98–123.
- “The 2019 Midterm Elections in the Philippines: Party System Pathologies and Duterte’s Populist Mobilization,” co-authored with Yuko Kasuya, Asian Journal of Comparative Politics, Vol. 5(1), 2020, 69–81.
- “Mapping the Philippines’ Defective Democratization,” co-authored with Cleo Calimbahin, Asian Affairs: An American Review, Volume 47 (2), 2020, 97-125
- “Les catastrophes humanitaires et l’essor de de la philanthropie religieuse mondialisée [Disasters and the Rise of Global Religious Philanthropy],” co-authored with Jayeel Cornelio Diogene, 2016, 122-139.
- “Regional Dimensions of the 2016 General Elections in the Philippines,” Regional and Federal Studies, Volume 28 Issue 3, 2018, 383-394.
- “Duterte’s Resurgent Nationalism in the Philippines: A Discursive Institutionalist Analysis,” Journal of Current Southeast Asian Affairs, 35 (3), 2016, 69-89.
- “The Vote in the Philippines: Electing A Strongman,” co-authored with Mark R. Thompson, Journal of Democracy, Volume 27 Issue 4, 2016, 124-34.
- “Weak State, Strong Presidents: Situating the Duterte Presidency in Philippine Political Time,” Journal of Developing Societies, Volume 32 Issue 3, 2016, 293-321.
- “The Philippines in 2015: The Calm Before the Political Storm,” Philippine Political Science Journal, Volume 37 (1), 2016, 228-238.
- “The Study of Politics in Southeast Asia: The Philippines in Southeast Asian Political Studies,” Philippine Political Science Journal, 35 (1), 2014, 1-18.
- “Party.Politics.Ph: Internet Campaigning in the Philippines,” Philippine Political Science Journal, Volume 31 (54), 2010, 87-116.
- “Synthesis and Distillation of Policy Issues: What Should Governments Do? The Global Financial Crisis as a Market and Government Failure” Asia-Pacific Social Science Review, Volume 9 (1), 2009, 85-90.
- “The Political Aftermath of the 1997 Crisis: From Asian Values to Asian Governance? Dialogue + Cooperation 18, 2007, 25-39.
- “Access to Justice Indicators in the Asia-Pacific Region,” Arellano Law and Policy Review, Volume 7 (1), 2006, 62-79.
- “Institutional Continuity and the 2004 Philippines Election,” Dialogue + Cooperation 11, 2005, 63-67.
- “Emerging Dynasties in the Post-Marcos House of Representatives,” Philippine Political Science Journal, Volume 22 (45), 2001, 55-78.
- “Internal Armed Conflicts and the Peace Process in the Philippines,” Kajian Malaysia Volume 18 Numbers 1 & 2. June–December 2000, 141-156.
- "Dynamics of Local Politics in Ibaraki Prefecture and Mito City after the Collapse of the 1955 System," Bulletin of College of General Education Ibaraki University, Volume 30, 1996, 343-350.
- “Party Politics and Philippine Political Development: An Assessment of the 1987, 1988 and 1992 Elections,” Praxis: Journal of Political Studies, Volume VII, Number 1, April 1995, 47-65.
- “The Context of Political Transition in Post-EDSA Philippines,” Praxis: Journal of Political Studies, Volume VI, Number 1 June 1994, 60-71.
- "The State, Illegal Logging and Environmental NGOs in the Philippines," Kasarinlan: Journal of the Third World Studies Center, Volume 9, Number 1 Third Quarter, 1993, 19-34.
- “The Spatio-temporal Roots of the Filipino Nation: A Reassessment of the Revolution of 1896, ” Praxis: Journal of Political Studies, Volume V, Number 1, 1991-1993, 30-43.
- “Between the Devil and the Deep Blue Sea: An Overview of the Legislature's Response to the Bases Issue,” DLSU Dialogue: Official Journal of De La Salle University, Volume XXIV, Number 1, 1989-1990, 15-25.

== Networks and professional organizations ==
Teehankee has held leadership positions in prominent professional organizations: council member (2019-2021) of the International Political Science Association (IPSA); president (2016-2019) and secretary (1995-1999) of the Philippine Political Science Association (PPSA); president (2009-2011) and executive secretary (2011-2016) of the Asian Political and International Studies Association (APISA); adviser (since 2016) of the Association of Political Consultants of Asia (APCA); Adviser (since 2017) the Philippine International Studies Organization (PhISO). Recently, he was the first Southeast Asian to be elected to the Executive Committee of the International Political Science Association (IPSA), an international scholarly association founded under the auspices of UNESCO in 1949.

He serves as the regional manager for Southeast Asia and the Pacific of the Varieties of Democracy (V-Dem) project. V-Dem produces the largest global dataset on democracy with some 28 million data points for 202 countries from 1789 to 2019. Previously, he has served as Country Evaluator for the Bertelsmann Transformation Index (BTI) reports for 2003 and 2014; and as Country Reporter for 2006, 2008, 2010, and 2012. BTI is a 128 country project focusing on the political management of the transformation toward Democracy and a Market Economy.

Teehankee is the associate editor of the Philippine Political Science Journal. He was former editor of the Asia Pacific Social Science Review. He is also a member of the editorial boards of a number of Scopus-indexed academic journals that include: the Asia Pacific Social Science Review, the Journal of Current Southeast Asian Affairs, the Asian Journal of Comparative Politics, and Asian Affairs: An American Review.

He is a lifetime member of the Pi Gamma Mu Honor Society, Beta chapter, Philippines.
