= Proposed federal states of the Philippines =

The following is a list of proposed subdivisions of the Philippines under a federal form of government.

This list includes nation-wide scale proposals as well as localized proposals for the formation of a federal state.

== Country-wide proposals ==
Year proposed	Proponent/s	Proposed subdivisions	Map	Notes
1899	Emilio Aguinaldo; Apolinario Mabini	Luzon; Visayas; Mindanao	No demarcation of proposed states available	Filipino revolutionaries Emilio Aguinaldo and Apolinario Mabini also suggested dividing the islands into three federal states patterned after the Philippines three main island groups.
1972	Salvador Araneta	Federal states (5); Northern Luzon; Southern Luzon; Visayas; Muslim Mindanao; Christian Mindanao; Other territory (1); Metro Manila	No demarcation of proposed states available	Under Salvador Araneta's proposal during the 1972 Constitutional Convention, the Philippines was proposed to be divided in five states. His proposal was recorded in a document dubbed as the "Bayanikasan Constitution", a portmanteau of "Lakas" and "Bayan". A distinct feature of Araneta's proposal was the troika – the federal government is to be governed equally by three parties; the President, the Prime Minister, and the Speaker of Parliament. A similar setup is also to be implemented in the regional states level.
2000	José Abueva	Metro Manila; Northern Luzon; Cordillera; Central Luzon; Southern Tagalog; Bicol-Samar; Visayas-Palawan; Western Mindanao; Bangsa Moro; Eastern Mindanao		This proposal was touted as a potential solution to the ongoing separatist conflict in Mindanao. In November 2000 a variation which added Manila as a federal district was supported by 22 of the country's 24 senators. This would create nine majority-Catholic states, and one majority-Muslim state, a situation compared to the English and French division among the Provinces of Canada. Other later variations adjusted the proposed states and increased the number of states to 11.
2008	Aquilino Pimentel Jr.	Federated states (16); Northern Luzon; Central Luzon; Southern Tagalog; Minparom; Bicol; Eastern Visayas; Central Visayas; Western Visayas; Northern Mindanao; Southern Mindanao; BangsaMoro; Federal Administrative Region (1); Metro Manila		Senator Aquilino Pimentel Jr. proposed Joint Resolution No. 10, which would revise the current 1987 constitution and have created eleven autonomous regions out of the Philippine Republic, establishing eleven centers of finance and development in the archipelago. The proposal would result in the creation of eleven "states" and one federal administrative region. Pimentel later made revisions to his proposal in 2017.
2017	Pantaleon Alvarez	Bicol; Ilocos; Metro Manila; Mimaropa; Central Luzon; Southern Tagalog; Unnamed I.P. State (Igorot); Eastern Visayas; Western Visayas; Eastern Mindanao; Western Mindanao; Unnamed Moro State (Sulu Archipelago); Unnamed Moro State (Maguindanao / Lanao del Sur); Unnamed I.P. State (Lumads)	No demarcation of proposed states available	House Speaker Pantaleon Alvarez's vision for a federal Philippines called for 14 states: 7 in Luzon, 2 in Visayas and 5 in Mindanao. He also proposed that the capital of the Philippines under a federal government should be somewhere in Negros Island saying that it would be accessible to all people from the three island groups while he added that the state's territory does not have to be contiguous. In February 2018, Alvarez reiterated that he shall input an indigenous state in the Cordilleras in Luzon and an indigenous state in Mindanao, whatever federal set-up is approved by the President.
2018	Consultative Committee; Body created by President Rodrigo Duterte through Executive Order No. 10	Federated states (16); National Capital Region (Metro Manila); Ilocos Region; Cagayan Valley; Central Luzon; CALABARZON; MIMAROPA; Bicol Region; Western Visayas; Central Visayas; Eastern Visayas; Negrosanon Region; Zamboanga Peninsula; Northern Mindanao; Davao Region; SOCCSKSARGEN; Caraga; Asymmetrical regions (2); Cordillera Administrative Region; Autonomous Region in Muslim Mindanao (Bangsamoro)		President Rodrigo Duterte issued Executive Order No. 10 which mandates for the creation of a 25-member Consultative Committee (ConCom) on December 7, 2016 for the review of the 1987 Constitution. Duterte appointed the first 22 members of the committee in January 24, 2018. As part of the Duterte administration's proposed shift of the country to a federal form of government; the ConCom came up with a proposal to divide the Philippines into 18 subdivisions from existing administrative regions of the country (plus Bangsamoro which superseded the Autonomous Region in Muslim Mindanao in 2019, and a Negrosanon Region) in their draft charter. Aquilino Pimentel Jr. who was a member of the committee also suggested including the Malaysia-administered Sabah (see North Borneo dispute), as one of the Philippines' federal state.
2018	League of Provinces of the Philippines	Existing 81 provinces as federal states		The League of Provinces of the Philippines proposed the retention of provinces as "autonomous sub-national level or independent ‘states’ under the general supervision of the duly-elected president of the federal government" which is a departure from common proposals at that time which calls for subdivisions based on regions.
2018	House of Representatives Sub-Committee 1	Federal states (5); Luzon; Visayas; Mindanao; Bangsamoro; Metro Manila	No demarcation of proposed states available	The Sub-Committee 1 of the House of Representatives Committee on Constitutional Amendments proposed that a federal Philippines would comprise five states. Each states to be led by a premiere as its executive head will have a State Assembly according to the proposal.

== Local state proposals ==
The following includes proposals which are forwarded by inhabitants and/or local officials in the area of the proposed federal state. These proposals may or may not be included in the listed country-wide proposals mentioned above.

- Bansa Sug / Zambasulta – At the Bangsa Sug Summit in 2018, participants of the convention including claimants of the Sultanate of Sulu, called for the creation of a Bansa Sug federal state consisting of the Sulu archipelago provinces and Zamboanga Peninsula. They also campaigned for the option to "opt-out" from the then-proposed Bangsamoro autonomous region.
- Negros Island – Following the abolition of the Negros Island Region in 2017 and the ongoing campaign of President Rodrigo Duterte for a shift of the Philippines's form of government to federalism, there are calls for the Negros island, consisting of Negros Occidental and Negros Oriental provinces, to be made into a single federal state or at least integrate the whole island in a larger single state if a federal form of government is adopted for the country. Negros Occidental 2nd District representative Rafael Leo Cueva said that the proposal is in line with the "One Island, One Region" movement which calls for the unification of the two provinces under a single region which began in the 1980s The region was reestablished in 2024.
