= Orders, decorations, and medals of the Philippines =

Philippine honors system

The orders, decorations, and medals conferred upon civilians and military personnel in the Republic of the Philippines are listed by orders of precedence. Philippine civilian orders and decorations are conferred by the President of the Philippines in his or her capacity as head of state. In certain instances, the conferment of certain orders and decorations requires the concurrence of the Congress of the Philippines, or of certain advisory bodies.

The Honors Code of the Philippines, established in 2003 through Executive Order No. 236, defines three awards of the highest prestige, collectively referred to as Honors:

- Orders are awards that grant membership in an exclusive association of honored individuals, and which by tradition carry with them distinctive insignia to be worn by recipients;
- Decorations are wearable awards usually conferred for a specific act of meritorious service;
- Medals are wearable awards usually conferred to recognize service and/or achievement or to commemorate a significant event.

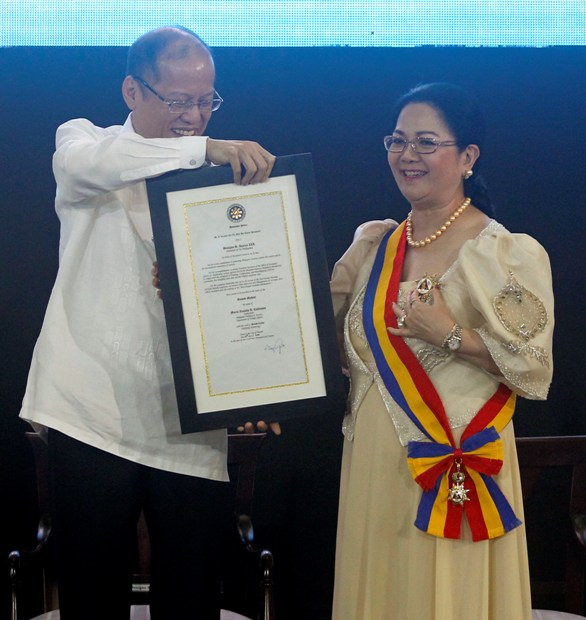
The late President Noynoy Aquino conferring the Gawad Mabini with a rank of Grand Cross (Dakilang Kamanong) on Philippine Ambassador to Austria Maria Zenaida Collinson during the 118th Foundation Anniversary of the Department of Foreign Affairs at Pasay City in June 2016

== Order of Wear ==
Decorations are ranked by the Order of Wear in the Implementing Rules and Regulations of Executive Order No. 236 as follows:

1. Honors of the Philippines (Presidential Awards enumerated in E.O. No. 236)
2. Other Presidential Awards (Presidential Awards not enumerated in E.O. No. 236)
3. Service Awards of the Agencies of the National Government
4. Decorations and Medals of the Uniformed Services (Philippine Coast Guard, Philippine National Police, Armed Forces of the Philippines)
5. Commemorative Medals of the Philippines
6. Commemorative Awards of the Agencies of the National Government
7. Insignia of the Order of the Knights of Rizal
8. Decorations of the Reserves and Auxiliaries of the Coast Guard, PNP, and the AFP
9. Insignia of Other Philippine Chivalric Orders, Fraternal Societies, and Professional Associations
10. Foreign Orders, Decorations and Medals
11. Insignia of Foreign Chivalric Orders, Fraternal Societies, and Professional Associations

== Civilian Decorations ==
The civilian order of precedence, established by the Honors Code of the Philippines, is as follows:

Class	Complete name	Ranks (letters)	Ribbon	Established	Founder	Motto	Awarded to/for
First Class Rank	Quezon Service Cross; Krus ng Serbisyo ni Quezon	QSC		October 21, 1946	Manuel Roxas	Sic floret respublica ('And thus, he distinguished the republic')	Exemplary service to the nation in such a manner and such a degree as to add great prestige to the Republic of the Philippines, or as to contribute to the lasting benefit of its people
Second Class Rank (Senior Honors of the Republic)	Order of Lakandula; Orden ni Lakandula	Grand Collar (GCL); Grand Cross (GCrL); Grand Officer (GOL); Commander (CL); Officer (OL); Member (ML)		September 19, 2003	Gloria Macapagal Arroyo		Acts that have been traditionally recognized by the institution of presidential awards, including meritorious political and civic service
Second Class Rank (Senior Honors of the Republic)	Order of Sikatuna; Orden ng Sikatuna	Grand Collar (GCS); Grand Cross (GCrS); Grand Officer (GOS); Commander (CS); Officer (OS); Member (MS)		February 27, 1953	Elpidio Quirino		Rending exceptional and meritorious services to the Republic of the Philippines; to diplomats, officials and nationals of foreign states who have rendered conspicuous services in fostering, developing and strengthening relations between their country and the Philippines
Second Class Rank (Senior Honors of the Republic)	Philippine Legion of Honor; Lehiyong Pandangal ng Pilipinas	Chief Commander (CCLH); Grand Commander (GCLH); Grand Officer (GOLH); Commander (CLH); Officer (OLH); Legionnaire (LLH)		July 3, 1947	Manuel Roxas		Meritorious and valuable service
Third Class Rank	Order of Gabriela Silang; Orden ni Gabriela Silang	GS		c. 1970s	Ferdinand Marcos		Spouses of heads of state and/or of government
Fourth Class Rank	Order of National Artists; Orden ng mga Pambansang Alagad ng Sining	ONA		April 2, 1972	Ferdinand Marcos		Having made significant contributions to the development of Philippine arts
Fourth Class Rank	Order of National Scientists; Orden ng mga Pambansang Alagad ng Agham	ONS		December 16, 1976	Ferdinand Marcos		Having made significant contributions to the development of Philippine sciences
Fourth Class Rank	Order of National Social Scientists; Orden ng mga Pambansang Alagad ng Agham Panlipunan	ONSS		December 17, 1976	Ferdinand Marcos		Life achievement in the social sciences
Fourth Class Rank	National Living Treasures Award; Gawad sa Manlilikha ng Bayan			April 3, 1992	Fidel V. Ramos		A Filipino citizen or group of Filipino citizens engaged in any traditional art uniquely Filipino, whose distinctive skills have reached such a high level of technical and artistic excellence and have been passed on to and widely practiced by the present generations in their community with the same degree of technical and artistic competence
Fourth Class Rank	Order of Lakandula (Special Class of Champion for Life); Orden ni Lakandula (Kampeon Habang Buhay)			June 13, 2006	Gloria Macapagal Arroyo		Outstanding achievement in international sports or beauty events and similar fields of competition and achievement
Fifth Class Rank	Mabini Award; Gawad Mabini	Grand Cross (GCrM); Commander (CM); Member (MM)		June 24, 1974	Ferdinand Marcos		Filipinos who have rendered distinguished service or promoted the interests of the Republic of the Philippines at home and abroad
Sixth Class Rank	Order of the Golden Heart; Orden ng Gintong Puso	Grand Collar (GCGH); Grand Cross (GCrGH); Grand Officer (GOGH); Commander (CGH); Officer (OGH); Member (MGH)		June 21, 1954	Ramon Magsaysay	Manum tuam apervit inope ('She hath opened her heart to the needy')	Distinguished services, moral aid, or volunteerism in the service of the Filipino masses
Seventh Class Rank	Presidential Medal of Merit; Pampanguluhang Medalya ng Merito	PMM		September 19, 2003	Gloria Macapagal Arroyo		Outstanding service to the President or government; gaining prestige for the country in an international event; a retiring cultural worker or artist, after serving the government in an official or advisory capacity; a foreign artist who has promoted Philippine culture; or for acts of merit that enhance the prestige of the Republic of the Philippines
Orders outside the official order of precedence (Eighth Class Rank)	Order of Lapulapu; Orden ni Lapulapu			April 7, 2017	Rodrigo Duterte		Invaluable or extraordinary service in relation to a campaign or advocacy of the President

== Awards and Decorations of the Armed Forces of the Philippines ==
These are military decorations which recognize service and personal or unit accomplishments of members and units of the Armed Forces of the Philippines (Philippine Army, Philippine Air Force, Philippine Navy and Philippine Marine Corps).

Military Personnel Decorations

1. Medal of Valor
2. Philippine Legion of Honor
  - Chief Commander (CCLH)
  - Grand Commander (GCLH)
  - Grand Officer (GOLH)
  - Commander (CLH)
  - Officer (OLH)
  - Legionnaire (LLH)
3. Outstanding Achievement Medal
4. Distinguished Conduct Star
5. Distinguished Service Star
6. Gawad Sa Kapayapaan
7. Gold Cross
8. Distinguished Aviation Cross
9. Distinguished Navy Cross
10. Silver Cross
11. Meritorious Achievement Medal
12. Distinguished Service Medal
13. Chief of Staff of the AFP Commendation Medal and Ribbon
14. Gawad sa Kaunlaran
15. Bronze Cross
16. Silver Wing Medal
17. Wounded Personnel Medal
18. Military Merit Medal
19. Sagisag ng Ulirang Kawal
20. Military Civic Action Medal
21. Parangal sa Kapanalig ng Sandatahang Lakas ng Pilipinas
22. Military Commendation Medal
23. Armed Forces Conduct Medal
24. Command Reservist (Volunteer) Officer and (Volunteer) Enlisted Personnel of the Year Medal and Ribbon
25. Annual Efficiency "E" Award for Naval Vessels

Civilian Para-military Personnel Decorations

- Kagitingan Sa Barangay
1. Category of Lakan
2. Category of Datu
3. Category of Maginoo

Civilian Defense Personnel Decorations

- Civilian Employee's Honorary and Incentive Award
  - Distinguished Honor Medal
  - Superior Honor Medal
- Civilian Merit Medal

Military Unit Decorations

- Philippine Republic Presidential Unit Citation Badge (PRPUCB)
- Martial Law Unit Citation
- People Power I Unit Citation
- People Power II Unit Citation

Civilian Para-military Unit Decorations

- Barangay Presidential Unit Citation Badge (BPUCB)

Military Service Medals and Ribbons

- Long Service Medal
- American Defense Medal & Ribbon
- Asiatic-Pacific Campaign Medal & Ribbon
- World War II Victory Medal & Ribbon
- Philippine Defense Medal & Ribbon
- Philippine Liberation Medal & Ribbon
- Resistance Movement Medal
- Jolo Campaign Medal & Ribbon
- Philippine Independence Medal
- Anti-Dissidence Campaign Medal & Ribbon
- Luzon Anti-Dissidence Campaign Medal & Ribbon
- Visayan Anti-Dissidence Campaign Medal & Ribbon
- Mindanao Anti-Dissidence Campaign Medal & Ribbon
- Philippine Korean Campaign Medal
- United Nations Service Medal & Ribbon
- Vietnam Service Medal & Ribbon
- Disaster Relief & Rehabilitation Operation Ribbon

== Awards and Decorations of the Philippine Coast Guard Auxiliary ==
To recognize Unit and Individual achievements made by its members; the Philippine Coast Guard Auxiliary, with the guidance of the Philippine Coast Guard, adopted a system of awards and decorations.

Personal Decorations

- Coast Guard Auxiliary Outstanding Achievement Medal
- Coast Guard Auxiliary Distinguished Service Medal
- Coast Guard Auxiliary Merit Medal
- Coast Guard Auxiliary Search and Rescue Medal
- Coast Guard Auxiliary Commendation Medal
- Coast Guard Auxiliary Civic-Action Medal
- Coast Guard Auxiliary Red Cross Medal
- Coast Guard Auxiliary Good Conduct Medal

Service Medals & Ribbons

- Coast Guard Auxiliary Long Service Medal
- Coast Guard Auxiliary Anti-Marine Pollution Campaign Medal
- Coast Guard Auxiliary Disaster Relief and Rehabilitation Operations Medal
- Coast Guard Auxiliary National Convention Medal
- Coast Guard Auxiliary International Convention Medal
- Coast Guard Auxiliary World Clean-up Day Campaign Medal

Unit Decorations

- Philippine Republic Presidential Unit Citation Badge
- Philippine Coast Guard Commandant Unit Citation Ribbon
- National Director PCGA Unit Citation Ribbon

== Awards and Decorations of the Philippine National Police ==
The Philippine National Police recognizes individual efficiency, gallantry in the face an enemy, and meritorious accomplishments of its personnel by awarding decorations and medals.

The awards and decorations of the PNP are patterned after the orders and medals of the Armed Forces of the Philippines with regard to its lineage from the Philippine Constabulary and the Integrated National Police which were fore-runners of this service branch and previously under the AFP.

Constabulary and INP awards and decorations are authorized for PNP Personnel had they been assigned with the Philippine Constabulary and the INP prior to the transition.

Law Enforcement Personal Decorations

- Medalya ng Kagitingan (PNP Medal of Valor)
- Medalya ng Kabayanihan (PNP Distinguished Conduct Medal)
- Medalya ng Katapatan sa Paglilingkod (PNP Distinguished Service Medal)
- Medalya ng Katapangan (PNP Bravery Medal)
- Medalya ng Katangitanging Gawa (PNP Outstanding Achievement Medal)
- Medalya ng Pambihirang Paglilingkod (PNP Special Service Medal)
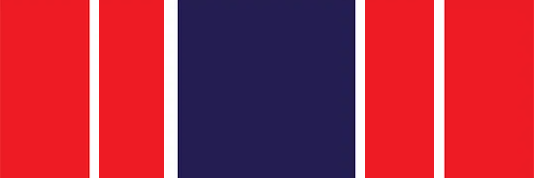
- Medalya ng Kadakilaan (PNP Heroism Medal)
- Medalya ng Katangitanging Asal (PNP Outstanding Conduct Medal)
- Medalya ng Kagalingan (PNP Medal of Merit)
- Medalya ng Kasanayan (PNP Efficiency Medal)
- Medalya ng Papuri (PNP Commendation Medal)
- Medalya ng Pagkilala (PNP Recognition Medal)
- Medalya ng Sugatang Magiting (PNP Wounded Personnel Medal)
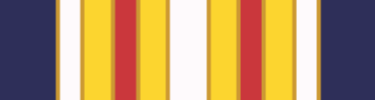
- Medalya ng Ugnayang Pampulisya (PNP Relations Medal)
- Medalya ng Mabuting Asal (PNP Good Conduct Medal)
- Medalya ng Paglilingkod (PNP Service Medal)
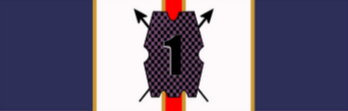
- Medalya ng Paglaban sa Kriminalidad (PNP Lambat Sibat Medal)

Law Enforcement Unit Decorations

- Philippine Republic Presidential Unit Citation Badge (PRPUCB)
- Martial Law Unit Citation
- People Power I Unit Citation
- People Power II Unit Citation

Law Enforcement Service Medals and Ribbons

- Medalya ng Paglaban sa Manliligalig (PNP Anti-dissidence Campaign Medal)
- Medalya ng Pagtulong sa Nasalanta (PNP Disaster Relief and Rehabilitation Operations Campaign Medal)
- Medalya ng Paglilingkod sa Luzon (PNP Luzon Campaign Medal)
- Medalya ng Paglilingkod sa Visayas (PNP Visayas Campaign Medal)
- Medalya ng Paglilingkod sa Mindanao (PNP Mindanao Campaign Medal)
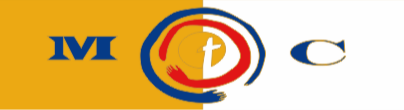
- Medalya ng Paglilingkod sa Santo Papa (Pope Francis Service Medal)
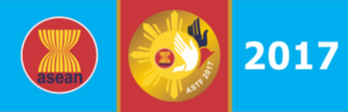
- ASEAN Summit 2017 Medal

Constabulary Personnel Decorations

- Constabulary Medal of Valor
- Distinguished Conduct Star
- Distinguished Service Star

Constabulary Service Medals and Ribbons

- Long Service Medal
- Luzon Campaign Medal
- Visayas Campaign Medal
- Mindanao and Sulu Campaign Medal
- Constabulary WWI Victory Medal
- National Guard WWI Victory Medal

== Awards and Decorations of the Bureau of Jail Management and Penology ==
After the creation of the PNP Act of 1991 transferred control of the Philippine National Police, Bureau of Jail Management and Penology, and the Bureau of Fire Protection from the Armed Forces to the Department of the Interior and Local Government, the Bureau of Jail Management and Penology established its own system of awards and decorations modeled on the PNP.

- Medalya ng Kagitingan
- Medalya ng Kabayanihan
- Medalya ng Kagalingan
- Medalya ng Natatanging Gawa
- Medalya ng Kadakilaan
- Medalya ng Sugatang Magiting
- Medalya ng Katapatan sa Paglilingkod
- Medalya ng Katapatan
- Medalya ng Kasanayan
- Medalya ng Papuri
- Medalya ng Paglilingkod
- Medalya ng Pambihirang Paglilingkod
- Medalya ng Katangi-tanging Asal
- Medalya ng Ugnayang Pangkumunidad
- Medalya ng Mabuting Asal
- Medalya ng Paglilingkod sa Luzon
- Medalya ng Paglilingkod sa Visayas
- Medalya ng Paglilingkod sa Mindanao
- Ribbon ng Natatanging Unit
- Ribbon ng Tagapagsanay
- Ribbon ng Pagtulong sa Nasalanta

== Dormant orders and awards ==
The consolidation of the Philippine honors system in 2003 led to the government discontinuing of the awarding of many honors. These honors and awards shall remain extant during the lifetime of the last holder of the respective awards, and shall continue to enjoy the rights and privileges thereof. Upon the death of the last living recipient, the respective affected awards shall cease to exist and be discontinued.

- Medal of Honor
- Rizal Collegiate Palms
- Mabini Teachers Medal
- Rizal Pro Patria Award
- Presidential Citation for Honesty and Integrity
- Order of the Grieving Heart
- Presidential Award in Education
- Order of Kalantiao
- Republic Cultural Heritage Award
- Presidential Citation for Outstanding Humanitarian Services
- International Artist
- Bayani ng Bagong Republika
- Presidential Citation for Outstanding Service to Philippine Democracy
- Presidential Award for Heroism in Times of Disaster
- Sajid Bulig Presidential Award for Heroism
- Presidential Mineral Industry Environment Award

== See also ==
- Philippines campaign medals
- Awards and decorations of the Armed Forces of the Philippines
- Knights of Rizal
- Ramon Magsaysay Award
- Royal and Hashemite Order of the Pearl
