= Benjamin Madrigal Jr. =

Chief of Staff of the Armed Forces of the Philippines

General Benjamin R. Madrigal Jr. AFP
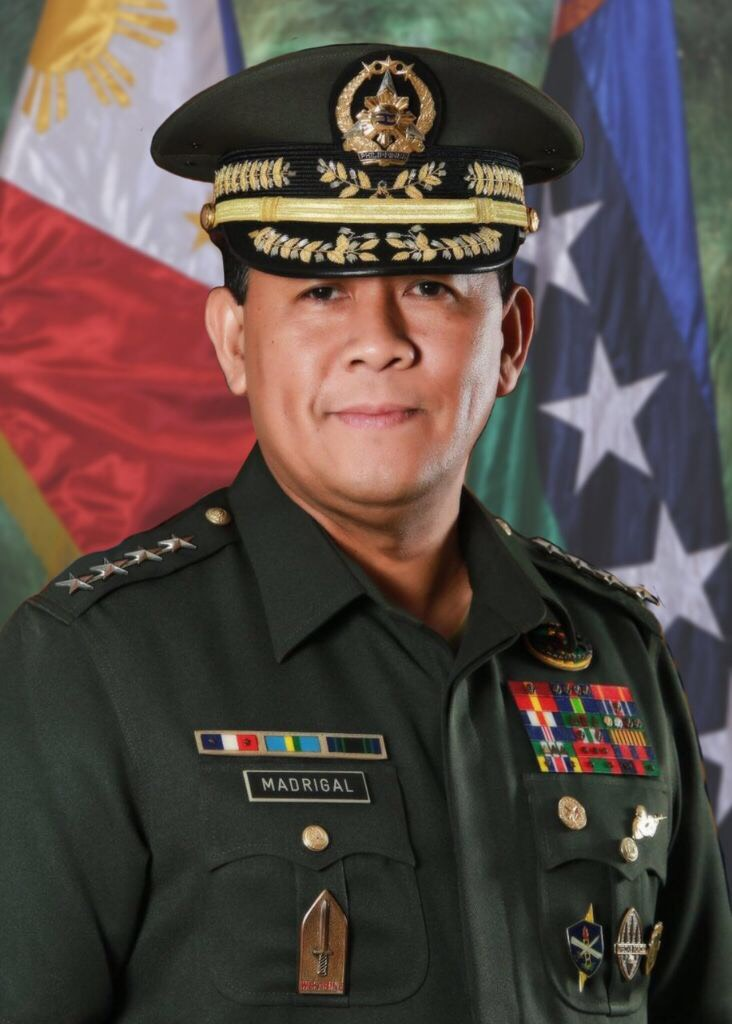

Administrator of the Philippine Coconut Authority
- In office January 27, 2020 – November 11, 2022
- President: Rodrigo Duterte; Bongbong Marcos
- Preceded by: Gonzalo Duque

51st Chief of Staff of the Armed Forces of the Philippines
- In office 12 December 2018 – 24 September 2019
- President: Rodrigo Duterte
- Preceded by: Gen. Carlito Galvez Jr.
- Succeeded by: Gen. Noel Clement

Personal details
- Born: September 28, 1963 (age 63) Los Baños, Laguna Philippines
- Education: Philippine Military Academy

Military service
- Allegiance: Philippines
- Branch/service: Philippine Army
- Years of service: 1985–2019
- Rank: General
- Unit: Chief of Staff of the Armed Forces of the Philippines; AFP Eastern Mindanao Command; AFP Southern Luzon Command; 4th Infantry Division; 10th Infantry Division; Deputy Chief of Staff for Plans, J5; Head Executive Assistant to the Chief of Staff; Philippine Army Chief of Staff; 701st Infantry Brigade, 10 ID; 26th Infantry Battalion, 4 ID
- Battles/wars: Moro conflict Communist rebellion in the Philippines

Benjamin Rasgo Madrigal Jr. (born September 28, 1963) is a retired Philippine Army general serving as the Administrator of the Philippine Coconut Authority under the Duterte administration since January 2020. He previously served as the Chief of Staff of the Armed Forces of the Philippines from December 2018 to September 2019. He is a graduate of the Philippine Military Academy "Sandiwa" Class of 1985, along with his predecessor Gen. Carlito Galvez Jr.

== Education and background ==
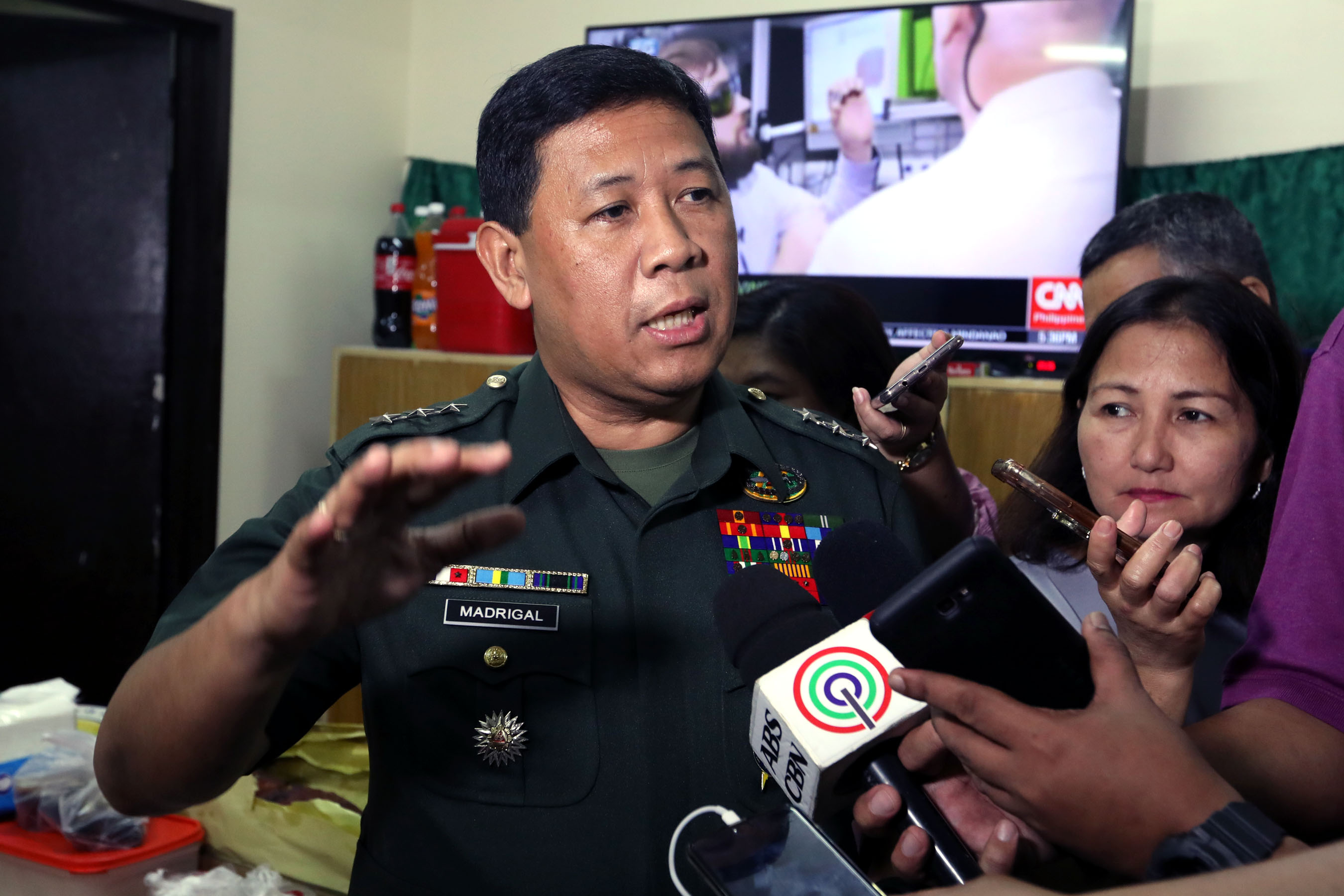
Gen. Madrigal in an interview with the media at Camp Aguinaldo.

Benjamin Madrigal is a product of the University of the Philippines Rural High School and the University of the Philippines Los Baños. He graduated in 1980 before entering the Philippine Military Academy in 1981.

He is a member of the Philippine Military Academy "Sandiwa" Class of 1985, and also attended various courses locally and abroad, such as the Infantry Officer Advance Course, and Special Security and Intelligence Course, in the AFP Command and General Staff College, ranking first in his class; the Forward Observer Course in Manly, Australia; and the Military and Peacekeeping Operations in Accordance with the Rule of Law in Newport, Rhode Island. He holds a master's degree in management studies at the University of New South Wales in Australia, and earned his Master of Public Administration in the Philippine Christian University.

He was also a member of the Board of Directors, Philippine Army Provident Fund (2010–2013), Philippine Army Officers’ Club Council (2010–2013), Philippine Army Golf Club Council (2010–2013), AFP Financial Institutions Accreditation Board (2010–2013), PMA Alumni Association, Inc. (PMAAAI) Mother Board (2009–2011), became the President of the Philippine-Australian Defense Scholars’ Association, Inc, (2012–2013), Vice President of the PMAAAI – Philippine Army Chapter (2011–2013), and the Manager of the Philippine Army Officers’ Club (2008–2009), as well as the President of the PMAAAI Eagle Fraternal Chapter (Davao) (2014–2018).

== Military career ==
After graduating in 1985, he spent most of his career deployed in Mindanao, and led various units in both the Philippine Army and the AFP, such as the 26th Infantry Battalion of the 4th Infantry Division, and the 701st Infantry Brigade of the 10th Infantry Division.

Throughout his military career, Madrigal is known to be focused, highly regarded, deliberate, and having "steep standards". He also served as the head executive assistant to the chief of staff, and later served as Philippine Army Chief of Staff, and also became the head of the Army Chief Management Fiscal Office. Madrigal would also later serve as the Deputy Chief of Staff for Plans, J5; responsible for overall war planning operations and for advising the AFP Chief of Staff on potential strategies and policy implementations.

Madrigal also led two infantry divisions: the 10th Infantry Division, where he served as both commander and assistant commander; and the 4th Infantry Division. Madrigal would later be appointed as the commander of the AFP Southern Luzon Command on August 22, 2017, before being transferred as the commander of the AFP Eastern Mindanao Command on November 14, 2017. On December 12, 2018, Madrigal was appointed as the Chief of Staff of the Armed Forces of the Philippines and succeeded his classmate, General Carlito Galvez Jr. Madrigal later earned his fourth star and was promoted to the rank of General on January 10, 2019, and continued his initiatives in combatting the communist insurgency and intensified counter-terrorism operations.

Throughout his term as AFP Chief, Madrigal would also continue the modernization of the AFP through the procurement of various assets, equipment, and weaponry through the continuous implementation of the AFP Modernization Program. Madrigal also led the creation of the Tribal Re-empowerment and Initiative Building Operations (TRIBO) framework, a framework aimed at resolving insurgency through military and non-military means. The framework also emphasized the importance of addressing basic needs such as food, medicine and housing, as well as cultural sensitivity, and engagements with indigenous communities. This initiative has led to the surrender of various tribal leader who were once engaged with the New People's Army, such as Datu Guibang Apuga, who once served as a leader of the tribal detachment in Davao del Norte and later surrendered to the authorities in June 2018. Madrigal also led the security of the 2019 Bangsamoro autonomy plebiscite and enhanced the military's disaster response capabilities and partnerships with various partners and allies within the region. Madrigal retired from military service on September 24, 2019, after serving more than 9 months in his post, where he was replaced by his classmate, General Noel Clement.

== Post military career ==
On January 28, 2020, President Rodrigo Duterte appointed Madrigal as the Administrator and the head of the governing board of the Philippine Coconut Authority. Madrigal served this post until November 11, 2022, as he was replaced by former DAR Acting Secretary Bernie F. Cruz.

Madrigal was later appointed as the Deputy Director General-Chief of Staff of the National Security Council on February 28, 2023.

== Awards ==

1st row		2 Chief Commander Medals, Philippine Legion of Honor	
2nd row	3 Outstanding Achievement Medals with one bronze anahaw cluster	7 Distinguished Service Stars with four bronze anahaw clusters	1 Silver Cross Medal
3rd row	3 Meritorious Achievement Medals with one bronze anahaw cluster	1 Distinguished Service Medal	1 Chief of Staff, AFP Commendation Medal
4th row	1 Gawad sa Kaunlaran	3 Bronze Cross Medals with one bronze anahaw cluster	1 Silver Wing Medal
5th row	Military Merit medals with 3 bronze spearhead devices (34 total medals)	Military Merit medals with 2 silver and 2 bronze anahaw clusters (34 total medals)	1 Sagisag ng Ulirang Kawal
6th row	3 Military Civic Action Medals	1st Parangal sa Kapanalig ng Sandatahang Lakas ng Pilipinas	2nd Parangal sa Kapanalig ng Sandatahang Lakas ng Pilipinas
7th row	28 Military Commendation Medal with one silver and two bronze triangular devices	Long Service Medal	Anti-dissidence Campaign Medal
8th row	3 Luzon Anti-Dissidence Campaign Medals with two campaign star	2 Mindanao Anti-Dissidence Campaign Medals with two campaign stars	Disaster Relief and Rehabilitation Operations Ribbon with three campaign stars

Right Side:

1st row	Philippine Republic Presidential Unit Citation	People Power I Unit Citation	People Power II Unit Citation

Badges and Other Awards:

- Legion of Merit (US Armed Forces)
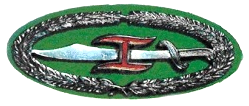
- Combat Commander's Badge (Philippines)
- Scout Ranger Qualification Badge
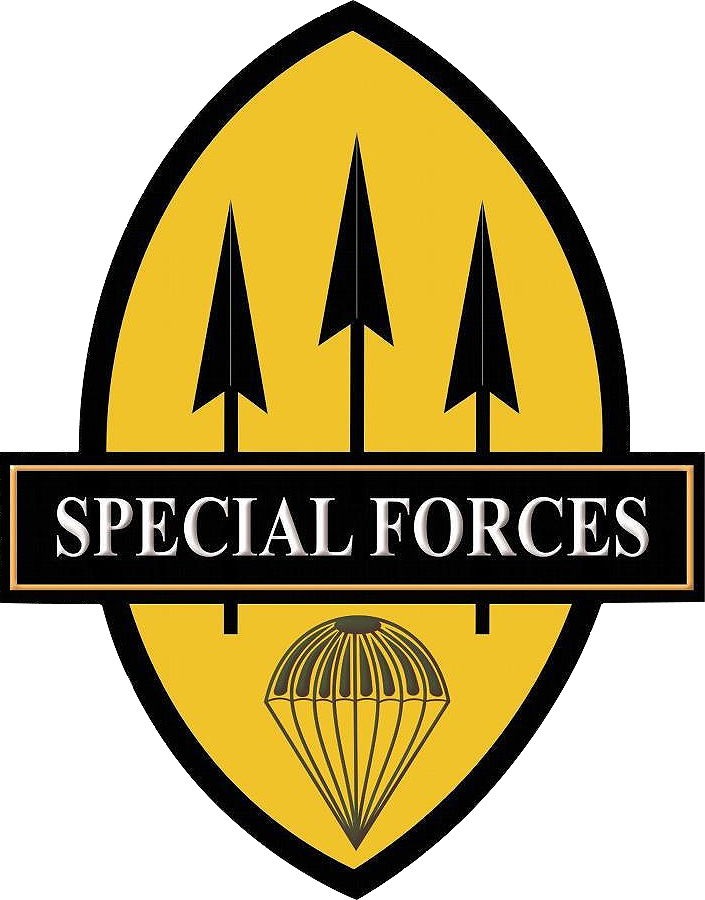
- Special Forces Qualification Badge
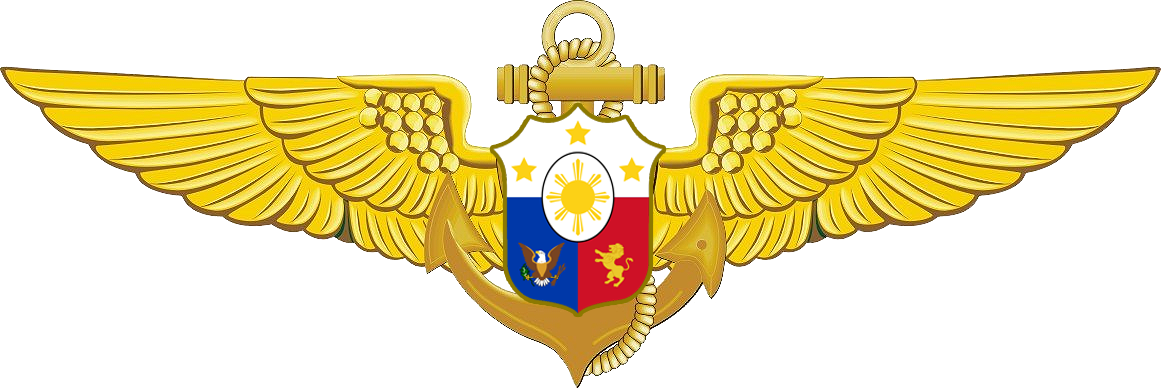
- Naval Aviator's Badge
- Philippine Army Command and General Staff Course Badge
- PAF Gold Wings Badge
- PMA Outstanding Achievement Award
- Kapit Bisig Trophy for AFP's PEACE recognition from the Metrobank Foundation

== Personal life ==
Known by his peers as "Benjie", Madrigal was born and raised in the resort town of Bayan, Los Baños, Laguna. He is married to Gemma "Gie" Convenido-Madrigal and they have four children.
