= Gregorio Catapang Jr. =

Philippine Armed Forces Chief of Staff (2014-2015)

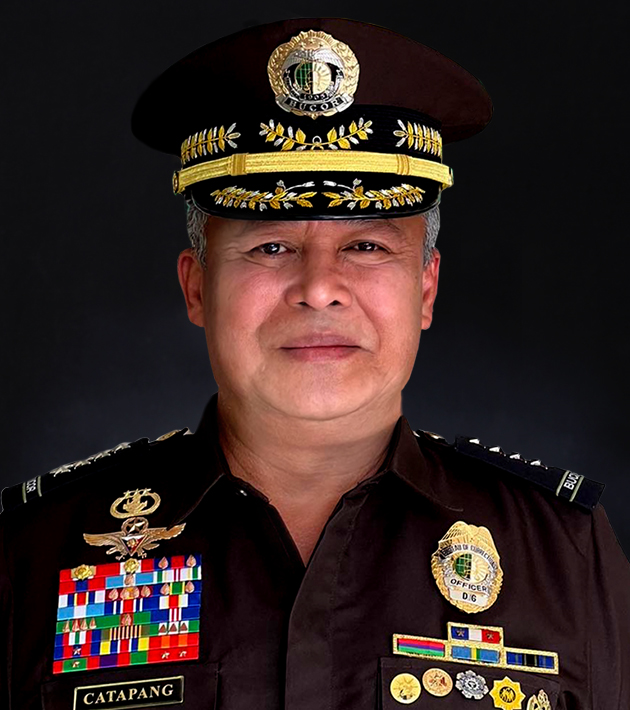
- Official portrait, 2022

Director-General of the Bureau of Corrections
- Incumbent
- Assumed office October 21, 2022
- President: Bongbong Marcos
- Preceded by: Usec. Gerald Q. Bantag

45th Chief of Staff of the Armed Forces of the Philippines
- In office July 18, 2014 – July 10, 2015
- President: Benigno Aquino III
- Preceded by: Emmanuel T. Bautista
- Succeeded by: Hernando Iriberri

Vice Chief of Staff of the Armed Forces of the Philippines
- In office May 16, 2014 – July 18, 2014

Northern Luzon Command, Armed Forces of the Philippines
- In office 2013–2013

Personal details
- Born: Gregorio Pio P. Catapang Jr. 11 July 1959 (age 67) Manila, Philippines
- Spouse: Vilma Villanueva
- Children: 4
- Education: Philippine Military Academy; University of the Philippines; Claret School of Quezon City; Australian Defence College
- Awards: Distinguished Service Star; Gold Cross Medal; OAM; Bronze Cross Medal; Military Merit Medal.

Military service
- Allegiance: Republic of the Philippines
- Branch/service: Philippine Army
- Years of service: 1981 – 2015
- Rank: General
- Unit: Chief of Staff, AFP; Vice Chief of Staff, AFP; Northern Luzon Command; 7 PA; 703IBDE, 7ID, PA; 28IB, 4ID, PA
- Battles/wars: Communist insurgency in the Philippines; Islamic insurgency in the Philippines

Gregorio Pio Punzalan Catapang Jr., CCLH (born 11 July 1959) is a Career Executive Service Eligible Officer, Corrections Officer, and retired Filipino general who served as the 45th Chief of Staff of the Armed Forces of the Philippines. He was the Vice Chief of Staff prior to his appointment as head of the armed forces. He was also the former head of the AFP Northern Luzon Command and 7th Infantry Division. He is part of the Philippine Military Academy Dimalupig Class of 1981. He was part of the Reform the Armed Forces Movement. On October 21, 2022, upon the suspension and dismissal of BUCOR Director General Usec. Gerald Bantag, Catapang was appointed by President Bongbong Marcos as the Officer in Charge, and eventually as the Full-Time Undersecretary/Director General of the Bureau of Corrections.

== Early life and education ==
Gregorio "Greg" Pio P. Catapang Jr. was born on July 11, 1959, in Manila. He is the second of four children of Gregorio Catapang Sr., a lawyer for the Securities and Exchange Commission, and Lourdes Punzalan, a CPA for the Department of Finance. He was named after two generals Gregorio del Pilar and Pio del Pilar. Early on in life his parents taught him the value of public service.

He attended Claret School of Quezon City highschool where he was voted as the high school class president. He entered the Philippine Military Academy in 1977 and graduated in 1981. Shortly after graduating from PMA he pursued graduate courses in the University of the Philippines and became a member of Upsilon Sigma Phi.

== Military career ==
He continued his career in the Philippine Army, serving in both field and garrison roles. He held positions of major responsibility, such as: Commander of the 7th Infantry (Kaugnay) Division, Philippine Army, Commander, 703 Infantry Brigade, of the 7ID, PA (now 10ID, PA) from September 6, 2010, to October 3, 2012; Battalion Commander of 28IB, 4ID, PA (now 10ID, PA) from November 20, 1999, to March 3, 2001; Battalion Commander of HHSBn, 4ID, PA from March 3 to December 17, 2001; Ac of S for Operations, G3, 8ID, PA from July 16, 2002, to February 1, 2003; ACUCS for CMO, U7, NOLCOM, AFP from February 19 to May 12, 2003; ACUCS for Operations, U3, NOLCOM, AFP from May 12, 2003, to October 24, 2005; and Chief of Unified Command Staff, NOLCOM, AFP from May 15 to October 24, 2005.

His professional military training include: Intel Officers Basic Course at the SITS, ISAFP in 1982; Infantry Officers Advance Course at Combat Arms School, TCPA in 1992; Command and General Staff Course at the Training and Doctrine Command at Fort Bonifacio in 2002; Australian and Military Familiarization Course and ADC Preparation Course at the Defence International Training Center in Australia, in 2005; Defence and Strategic Studies Course at the Australian Defence College in 2006; Symposium on National Security and Strategy at NDU, PLA, China in 2007; and Change Management Workshop and Strategic Communications at the Australian Defense Coop Program in 2008.

=== Communist insurgency ===
Catapang was instrumental in the normalization of Northern and Central Luzon. As an Army captain he helped transform Porac from a hotbed of communist insurgency to peaceful municipality. As a General by the time he left as NOLCOM Command he was able to declare Central Luzon as peaceful and ready for further development

=== Climate change ===
Catapang was recognized for significantly contributing to the relief operations in the aftermath of Tropical Storm Ondoy in 2009. At the time, he was assigned to the Office of Civil Defense.

=== Chief of Staff ===
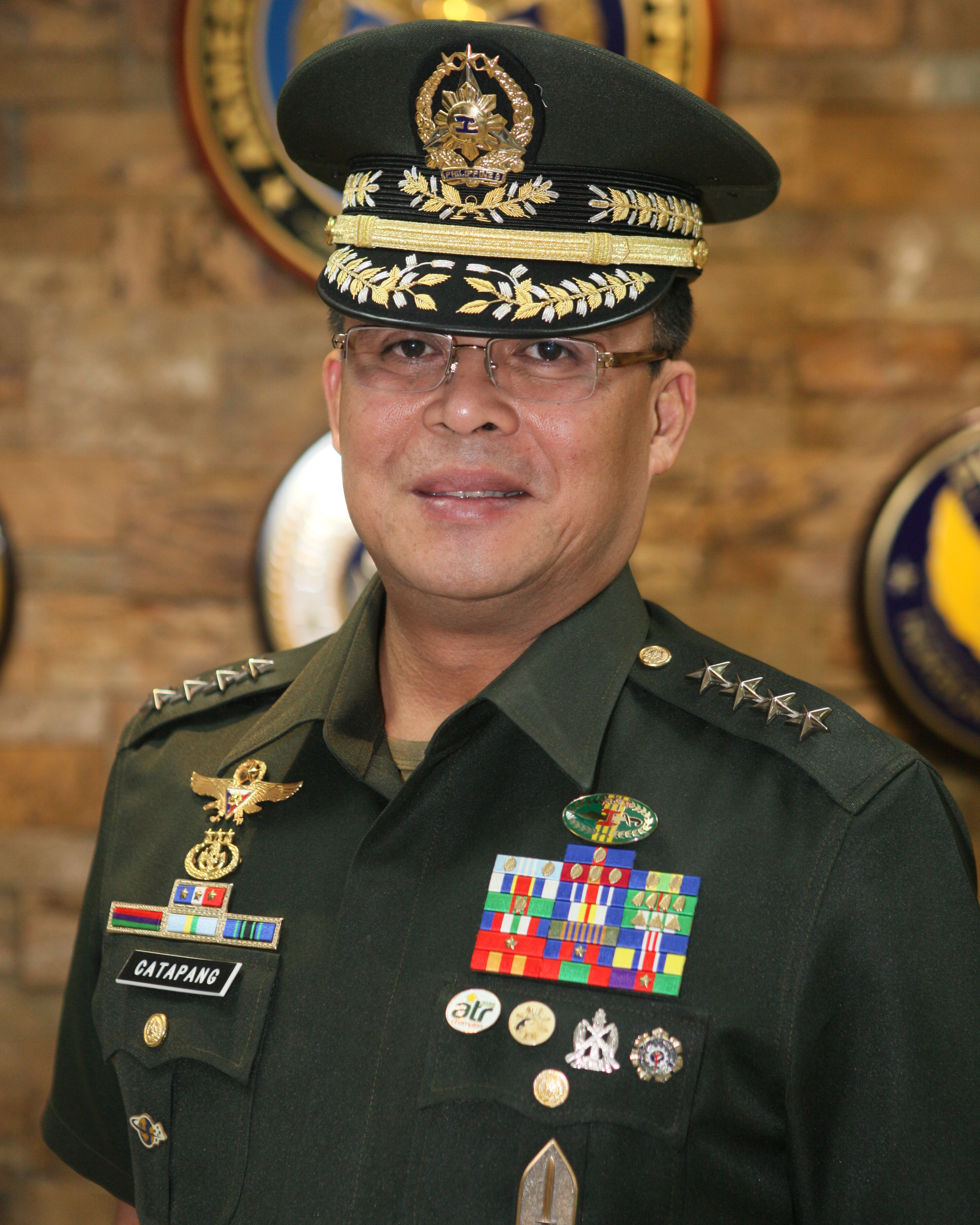
Official portrait, 2014

In his talk to men, Catapang urged the troops to strictly adhere to the AFP's slogan of “Kawal DISIPLINADO, bawal ABUSADO, dapat ASINTADO”. These three key words are acronyms that spell out the dos and don'ts to be followed by every AFP personnel for them “to become proficient in fire and maneuver and be able to avoid collateral damage; be respectful of human rights, adhere to international humanitarian law and rule of law, as well as the rules of engagement of the IPSP Bayanihan.”

Catapang vowed to continue modernization of the Armed Forces of the Philippines, from being the hub of "flying coffin helicopters" and an "Itali Yan" navy, to the home of a strong and well-equipped Philippine Air Force and Philippine Navy.

Catapang promised to enhance the anti-insurgency campaign, dubbed the Internal Peace and Security Plan (IPSP), especially against the Communist Party of the Philippines-New People's Army-National Democratic Front (CPP–NPA–NDF).

In 2014, Catapang advised 40 Filipino soldiers serving as peacekeepers for the United Nations Disengagement Observer Force who were surrounded by Syrian Islamist rebels in the Golan Heights to defy an order from the commander of the UN forces to lay down their arms and surrender. The Filipino soldiers instead engaged the rebels and managed to escape.

He is the Chief of Staff during the failed rescue of 44 Special Action Force Commandos who died in Mamasapano, Maguindanao.

== Bureau of Corrections ==
On March 19, 2024, unidentified assailants on Toyota Vios at Metro Manila Skyway suddenly overtook and opened fire at Catapang Jr.'s bulletproof back-up vehicle silver Toyota Hilux with plate no. WDQ 811 driven by CO1 Cornelio Colalong and accompanied by CO1 Leonardo Cabaniero, and escorted by an Innova driven by CSO2 Edwin Berroya and CO2 Michael Magsanoc. “Catapang said that both he and Perreras have been receiving death threats since they implemented various reforms in the agency and this incident will not deter them from continuing what they started,” BuCor said.

=== Military service awards ===
- Philippine Republic Presidential Unit Citation
- Martial Law Unit Citation
- People Power I Unit Citation
- People Power II Unit Citation
- Philippine Legion of Honor- Degree of Chief Commander and Officer
- Distinguished Service Star
- Distinguished Conduct Star
- Gold Cross (Philippines)
- Outstanding Achievement Medal
- Gawad sa Kaunlaran
- Distinguished Aviation Cross
- Bronze Cross Medals
- Military Merit
- Military Commendation Medal
- Military Civic Action Medal
- Silver Wing Medal
- Parangal sa Kapanalig ng Sandatahang Lakas ng Pilipinas
- Gawad sa Kaunlaran
- Gawad sa Kapayapaan
- Bintang Yudha Dharma Utama
- Long Service Medal
- Sagisag ng Ulirang Kawal
- Anti-Dissidence Campaign Medal
- Luzon Anti Dissidence Campaign Medal
- Visayas Anti-Dissidence Campaign Medal
- Mindanao Anti-dissidence Campaign Medal
- Disaster Relief and Rehabilitation Operations Ribbon
- Combat Commander's Badge (Philippines)
- Scout Ranger Badge
