= Jaime de los Santos =

Filipino military general (born 1946)

Commanding General Philippine Army
- In office 2001–2002
- Preceded by: LGen. Diomedio Villanueva
- Succeeded by: LGen. Dionisio Santiago

Deputy Chief of Staff Armed Forces of the Philippines
- In office October 2000 – July 2001
- Preceded by: Rear Admiral Napoleon Baylon
- Succeeded by: Major General Narciso Abaya

Commander UNTAET
- In office February 2000 – July 2000
- Preceded by: Peter Cosgrove INTERFET
- Succeeded by: Lieutenant General Boonsrang Niumpradit

AFP Visayas Command
- In office 1999–2000
- Preceded by: Major General Julius Javier
- Succeeded by: Rear Admiral Napoleon Baylon

Superintendent Philippine Military Academy
- In office 1998–1999
- Preceded by: Commodore Juan De Leon
- Succeeded by: Maj. Gen. Manuel Carranza

Personal details
- Born: 2 April 1946 (age 80) Nueva Ecija, Commonwealth of the Philippines
- Education: Bachelor of Science Degree (1969)
- Alma mater: Philippine Military Academy (1969)

Military service
- Allegiance: Philippines
- Branch/service: Philippine Army
- Years of service: 1969–2002
- Rank: Lieutenant General
- Commands: Commanding General of the Philippine Army; Commander AFP Visayas Command; Superintendent of the Philippine Military Academy; Force Commander of the United Nations Transitional Administration in East Timor (UNTAET)
- Battles/wars: Communist rebellion in the Philippines; Moro conflict

Jaime de los Santos (born April 1946 in Nueva Ecija, Philippines) is a retired Filipino military general who led the United Nations Transitional Administration in East Timor (UNTAET) and the first Filipino officer to lead an international peacekeeping force on foreign soil. He also served as chief of staff and the commanding general of the Philippine Army.

De los Santos joined the Philippine Army in 1969 after graduating from the Philippine Military Academy with a Bachelor of Science in Military Engineering. De los Santos later on served as a brigade commander, chief of staff and commanding general of an infantry division and superintendent of the Philippine Military Academy.

In December 1999, United Nations Secretary-General Kofi Annan appointed de los Santos as the Force Commander of the UNTAET. The International Force East Timor (INTERFET) commanded by Australian Major General Peter Cosgrove transitioned to the UNTAET Peacekeeping Force on 23 February 2000. Thus, Santos became the first Filipino officer to lead an international peacekeeping force.

In 2001, President Gloria Macapagal Arroyo appointed de los Santos as the chief of staff and the commanding general of the Philippine Army of the Armed Forces of the Philippines. He retired from military service in April 2002.

== Awards in military service ==
- Philippine Republic Presidential Unit Citation
- People Power I Unit Citation
- People Power II Ribbon
- Martial Law Unit Citation
- Distinguished Service Stars
- 1 Distinguished Conduct Star
- Presidential Medal of Merit
- 1 Outstanding Achievement Medal
- Gawad sa Kaunlaran
- Bronze Cross Medals
- Military Merit Medals with one silver and three bronze anahaws
- Silver Wing Medal
- Military Commendation Medals
- Military Civic Action Medal
- Sagisag ng Ulirang Kawal
- Long Service Medal
- United Nations Service Medal
- Anti-dissidence Campaign Medal
- Luzon Anti-Dissidence Campaign Medal
- Visayas Anti-Dissidence Campaign Medal
- Mindanao Anti-Dissidence Campaign Medal
- Disaster Relief and Rehabilitation Operations Ribbon
- United Nations Transitional Administration in East Timor (UNTAET) Ribbon
- AFP Parachutist Badge
- Combat Commander's Badge (Philippines)
- Philippine Air Force Gold Wings Badge

== See also ==
- Commanding General, Philippine Army
- Deputy Chief of Staff, Armed Forces of the Philippines
- Philippine Military Academy

Preceded by Diomedio P. Villanueva	Commanding General of the Philippine Army; 17 March 2001 – 2 April 2002	Succeeded by Dionisio R. Santiago
