= Noel Clement =

Filipino general (born 1954)

Retired General Noel S. Clement AFP
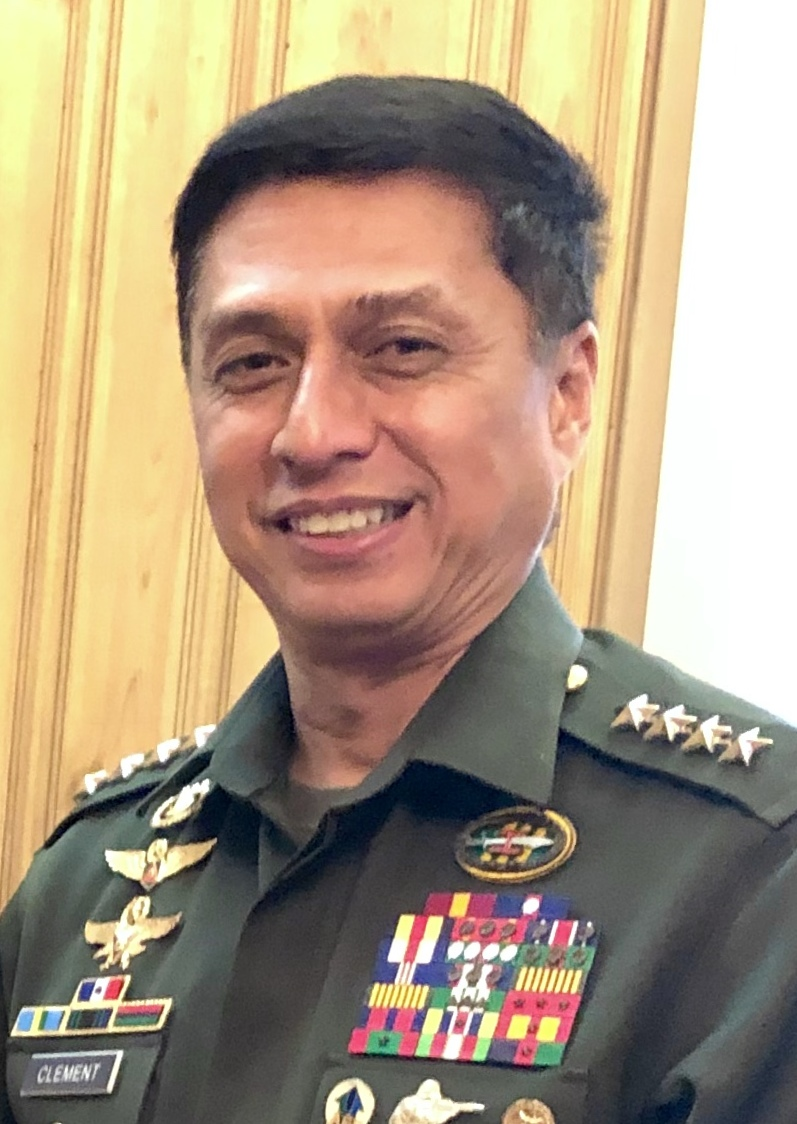
- General Noel S. Clement in 2019

52nd Chief of Staff of the Armed Forces of the Philippines
- In office 24 September 2019 – 4 January 2020
- President: Rodrigo Duterte
- Preceded by: Gen. Benjamin Madrigal Jr.
- Succeeded by: Gen. Felimon Santos Jr.

Personal details
- Born: January 5, 1964 (age 62) Lipa, Batangas, Philippines
- Education: Philippine Military Academy

Military service
- Allegiance: Philippines
- Branch/service: Philippine Army
- Years of service: 1985–2020
- Rank: General
- Unit: Chief of Staff of the Armed Forces of the Philippines; AFP Central Command; 10th Infantry Division; Deputy Chief of Staff for Operations, Organization & Training, J3; Joint Task Force Sulu; 501st Infantry Brigade, 5 ID; 602nd Infantry Brigade, 6 ID; 56th Infantry Battalion, 7 ID; 44th Infantry Battalion, 1 ID
- Battles/wars: Moro conflict Communist rebellion in the Philippines

Noel Segovia Clement (born January 5, 1964) is a retired Filipino general who previously served as the Chief of Staff of the Armed Forces of the Philippines. Prior to his appointment as Chief of Staff, he served as the commander of the AFP Central Command, and the 10th Infantry Division. He is a graduate of the Philippine Military Academy "Sandiwa" Class of 1985.

== Early life and education ==
He was born on January 5, 1964, at Lipa, Batangas, and was raised in Davao City. He studied at DOLE Philippines School in South Cotabato, Stella Maris Academy of Davao, and earned his Bachelor of Science in Commerce (BComm.) at the Ateneo de Davao University, before entering the Philippine Military Academy in 1981 and graduated in 1985.

He also attended various courses in the Armed Forces of the Philippines Command and General Staff College and abroad.

== Career ==
After his graduation in 1985, he held positions in the Army such as a platoon leader, company commander, and staff positions in the 44th Infantry Battalion from 1985 to 1993.

He served as commander of the 56th Infantry Battalion, the 602nd Infantry Brigade, and the 501st Infantry Brigade. He also served as a member of the Presidential Security Group.

He also served as the Chief of the AFP Management and Fiscal Office, Commandant of Cadets and Head of Tactics Group in the Philippine Military Academy, Commander of Joint Task Force Sulu in 2014, the Deputy Chief of Staff for Operations, Organization & Training, J3 from 2016 to 2017, became commander of the 10th Infantry Division in the Davao Region in 2017, and became commander of the AFP Central Command based in Cebu City in November 2018, before being appointed as the 52nd Chief of Staff of the Armed Forces of the Philippines on September 24, 2019, and he was promoted to General on October 30, 2019

As AFP Chief, he was responsible for the overall military preparations during the 2019 Southeast Asian Games.

== Awards ==
- Philippine Republic Presidential Unit Citation
- Martial Law Unit Citation
- People Power I Unit Citation
- People Power II Unit Citation
- Chief Commander, Philippine Legion of Honor
- 4 Distinguished Service Stars
- 3 Meritorious Achievement Medals
- 1 Distinguished Service Medal
- 3 Bronze Cross Medals
- 1 Silver Wing Medal
- 22 Military Merit Medal (Philippines)
- 1 Sagisag ng Ulirang Kawal
- 4 Military Civic Action Medals
- 1 Parangal sa Kapanalig ng Sandatahang Lakas ng Pilipinas
- 4 Military Commendation Medal
- 2 Long Service Medals
- 1 Anti-dissidence Campaign Medal
- 2 Luzon Anti-Dissidence Campaign Medals
- 2 Visayas Anti-Dissidence Campaign Medals
- 2 Mindanao Anti-Dissidence Campaign Medals
- 1 Jolo and Sulu Campaign Medal
- Disaster Relief and Rehabilitation Operations Ribbon
- Combat Commander's Badge (Philippines)
- Scout Ranger Qualification Badge
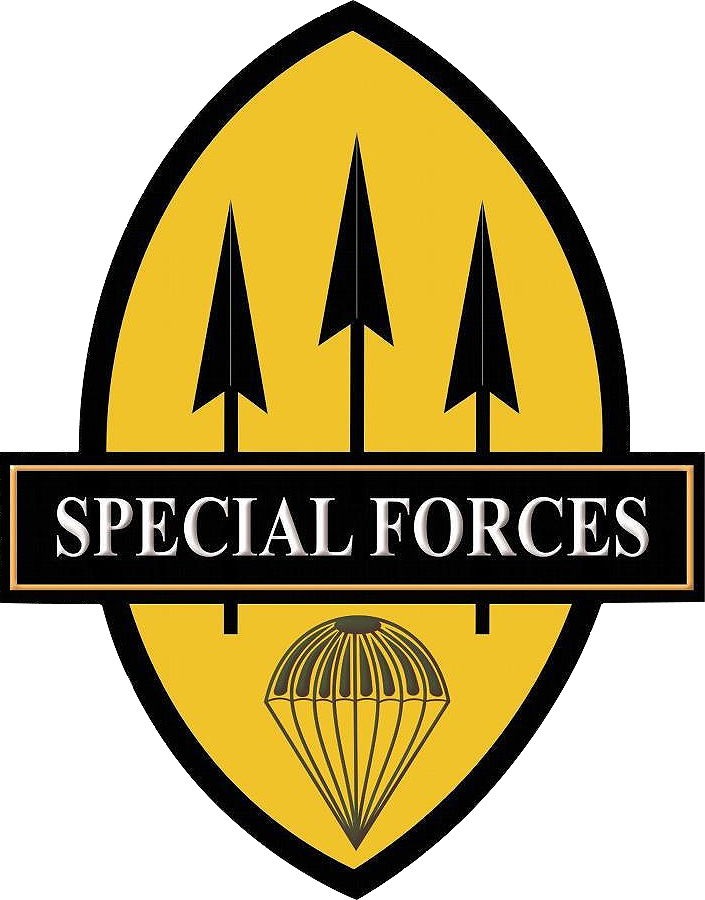
- Special Forces Qualification Badge
- Presidential Security Group Badge
- Philippine Army Command and General Staff Course Badge
- Army Aviation Badge
- PAF Gold Wings Badge

== Disappearance of Jonas Burgos ==
During his stint as commander of the 56th Infantry Battalion, then-Lieutenant colonel Clement was one of the officers tagged in the disappearance of communist leader and activist Jonas Burgos in Quezon City in 2007, but was later cleared in the investigation due to lack of evidence.

== Personal life ==
He is married to Geraldine Anne Valerio, and he has two sons.
