= Cardozo Luna =

Filipino military general

Cardozo "Ding" M. Luna
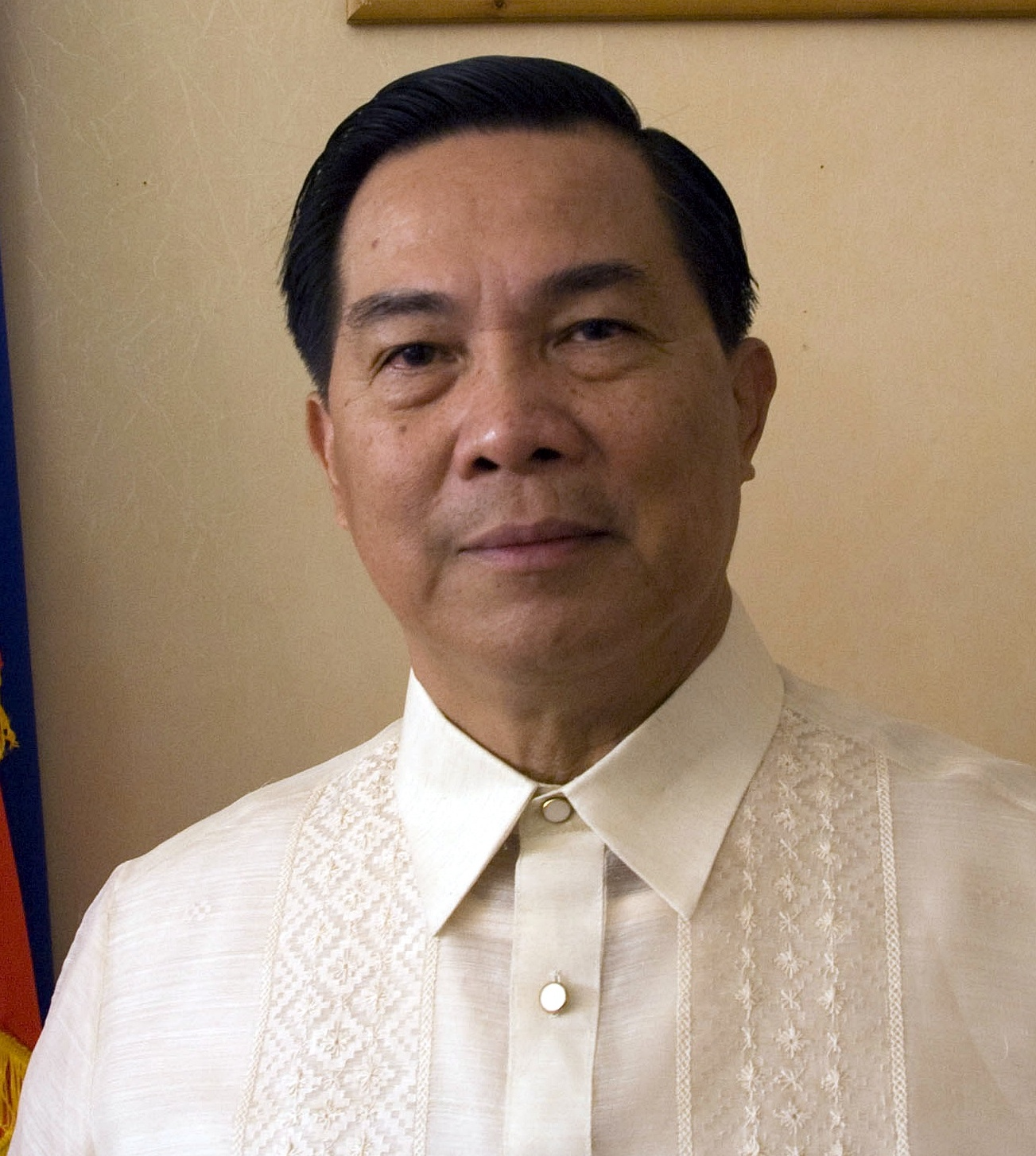
- Lieutenant General Cardozo M. Luna

Undersecretary of National Defense
- In office July 2016 – June 30, 2022
- President: Rodrigo Duterte
- Preceded by: Honorio Azcueta
- Succeeded by: Jose Faustino Jr.

Philippine Ambassador to The Netherlands
- In office August 2009 – September 2010
- President: Gloria Macapagal Arroyo
- Preceded by: Romeo Arguelles
- Succeeded by: Lourdes Morales

35th Vice Chief of Staff of the Armed Forces of The Philippines
- In office May 2008 – May 2009
- President: Gloria Macapagal Arroyo
- Preceded by: Lt. Gen. Antonio Romero
- Succeeded by: Lt. Gen. Rodrigo Maclang

Commander of AFP Eastern Mindanao Command
- In office August 2007 – May 2008
- President: Gloria Macapagal Arroyo
- Preceded by: Lt. Gen. Rodolfo Obaniana
- Succeeded by: Maj. Gen. Armando Cunanan

Commander of AFP Central Command
- In office August 2006 – August 2007
- President: Gloria Macapagal Arroyo
- Preceded by: Lt. Gen. Samuel Bagasin
- Succeeded by: Maj. Gen. Victor Ibrado

Commander of 4th Infantry Division, PA
- In office November 2005 – August 2006
- President: Gloria Macapagal Arroyo
- Preceded by: Lt. Gen. Samuel Bagasin
- Succeeded by: Brig. Gen. Jose Barbieto

Personal details
- Born: Cardozo Manalo Luna; September 7, 1953 (age 73) San Ildefonso, Bulacan, Philippines
- Spouse: Joyce S. Luna
- Education: Philippine Military Academy; University of the Philippines Diliman; University of Pennsylvania
- Profession: Retired Military Officer; Former Diplomat; Former Chief Executive; Government Official
- Awards: Distinguished Service Star; Philippine Legion of Honor, Commander; Outstanding Achievement Medal; Bronze Cross Medal; Military Merit Medal; Military Commendation Medal; Military Civic Action Medal; Sagisag ng Ulirang Kawal; Chief of Staff Award; CG, PA Award (Order of Gen. Emilio Aguinaldo); Mindanao Anti-Dissident Campaign Medal and Ribbon; Luzon Anti-Dissident Campaign Medal and Ribbon; Mindanao-Sulu Campaign Medal and Ribbon

Military service
- Allegiance: Republic of the Philippines
- Branch/service: Philippine Constabulary; Philippine Army
- Years of service: 1975-2009
- Rank: Lieutenant General
- Commands: Vice Chief of Staff, AFP; AFP Eastern Mindanao Command; AFP Central Command; 4th Infantry (Diamond) Division; Philippine Army Training and Doctrine Command; Commandant of Cadets, PMA; Tactics Groups, PMA; 602nd Infantry Brigade, 6ID, PA; Defense Intelligence and Security Group, DND; Assistant Chief of Staff, Civil Military Operations (G7), PA

Cardozo Manalo Luna (born September 7, 1953) is a retired three-star general and the 35th Vice Chief of Staff of the Armed Forces of the Philippines. Cardozo Luna also served as the commander of two unified commands, Eastern Mindanao Command and Central Command. He served as the Philippine Ambassador to The Hague, Netherlands from 2009 until 2010. He was Undersecretary of Department of National Defense from 2017-2022.

== Background ==
Cardozo was born to lawyer and retired colonel (Philippine Constabulary) Raymundo V. Luna and his wife, Teofista M. Luna. He was born in San Ildefonso, Bulacan, Philippines and raised in Santo Tomas, Batangas where he graduated consistently on top of his elementary and high school classes. Owing to Colonel Luna's profession as a lawyer, his son Cardozo is named after Benjamin N. Cardozo, the renowned Associate Justice of the United States Supreme Court who significantly contributed to the development of American Civil Law in the 20th century. He descended from the Luna clans of Badoc, Ilocos Norte where the ancestry of Antonio Luna and Juan Luna, members of the 1896 Philippine Revolution also came from.

He is married to Mrs. Joyce Marcelina Espinosa Siongco Luna. She is the daughter of Brig. General Gonzalo H. Siongco, the first Commanding General of the 6th Infantry (Kampilan) Division. Cardozo and Joyce have two sons and three daughters.

== Education ==
Cardozo is a member of the Philippine Military Academy "Makabayan" Class of 1975, graduated number 6 in a class of 91. Prior to his admission to PMA as a cadet, Cardozo Luna entered Mapúa Institute of Technology taking up Civil Engineering. While already in the service, he pursued post-graduate courses in the Philippines and the United States. He graduated with Masters in Economics Development from the University of the Philippines Diliman. He also obtained his second graduate degree of Master of Arts in Economics Planning and poised to complete his Doctoral Degree in Regional Economics at the prestigious Ivy League business school of the University of Pennsylvania. He is a member of the prestigious Wharton-Penn Club of the Philippines. He is also a Defense Diplomacy Fellow in Cranfield University in the United Kingdom.

Other than being touted as an academic giant in the military, Cardozo also excelled in his military education and training record. He attained top honors when he took the PC Officers Basic Course, PC Officers Advance Course (August 1988), and the AFP Command and General Staff Course and the Joint Command and Staff Course in April 1995 at the Armed Forces of the Philippines Command and General Staff College.

== Military career ==
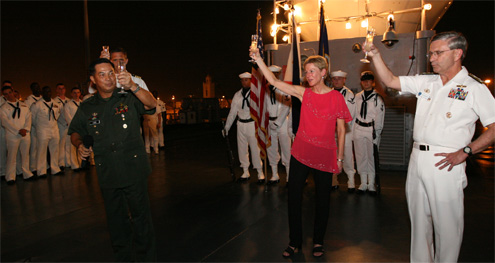
USS Blue Ridge (LCC-19) Commander Vice Adm. Doug Crowder, U.S. Ambassador Kristie Kenney, AFP Vice Chief of Staff Lt. Gen. Cardozo Luna lead a toast to the strong alliance between the US and the Philippines.

Upon graduation from the academy, Cardozo was commissioned as Second Lieutenant and joined the Philippine Constabulary. He spent most of his junior-officer's years in Mindanao. After his stint in Mindanao, he served as Junior Staff at AFP General Headquarters & Headquarters Service Command and at Department of National Defense. He was also assigned as a Junior Staff at the defense attaché in Washington, D.C., USA from 1981 until 1984. Upon his return to the country, he served as Vice President of the Armed Forces & Police Mutual Benefit Association (AFPMBAI) and, soon after, as Vice President/Assistant General Manager of the Armed Forces & Police Savings and Loan Association Inc. (AFPSLAI). In 1987, he assumed as the District Commander of the Philippine Constabulary 1st District, Regional Command (RECOM) 4 and later served as the Commanding Officer of the 214th PC Coy, RECOM 4 in Batangas.

Among the significant positions he held in the past were: Defense Intelligence Security Group and Military Intelligence Group (MIG) Commander; Battalion Commander of the 37th Infantry Brigade, 6th Infantry Division in Mindanao from November 16, 1995 to May 16, 1997; Assistant Chief of Staff of the Civil Military Operations (G7) of the Philippine Army from November 18, 1997 to July 23, 1999; Commanding Officer of the 302nd Infantry Brigade, 3rd Infantry Division from June 28, 2001 to April 16, 2002.

Upon promotion to star-rank, he assumed positions of higher responsibility as Commanding General of the 602nd Infantry Brigade, 6th Infantry Division from April 16, 2002 to July 25, 2003; Commandant of Cadets and Head, Tactics Group of the Philippine Military Academy from July 21, 2003 to October 18, 2004; Commanding General, Training and Doctrine Command from October 25, 2004 to November 7, 2005; Commanding General of the 4th Infantry (Diamond) Division from November 2, 2005 to August 10, 2006; Commander of the AFP Central Command based in Cebu City from August 2, 2006 to August 30, 2007 where he also supervised the security of the ASEAN Summit protecting 18 Heads of State; and Commander of the AFP Eastern Mindanao Command based in Davao City from August 31, 2007 to May 16, 2008. During his stint as the Commanding General of the AFP EastMinCom, he commanded and controlled 3 Army Infantry Divisions, a Naval Force, a Tactical Operations Wing, and several AFP Wide Service Support Units in Eastern Mindanao whose area of responsibility covers Regions 10, 11, 12, Caraga Region, and three provinces of ARMM such as: Maguindanao, Sharif Kabunsuan, and Lanao del Sur, consisting of not less than 25,000 uniformed personnel and civilian employees of the AFP.

Luna is a recipient of various military awards and decorations (including the Distinguished Service Star), numerous Letters of Commendations from various military officers and Resolutions from Chief Executives of government agencies and Local Government Units for his valuable services rendered as an officer and a gentleman.

Col. Cardozo Luna, head of the 602nd Infantry Brigade, captured a key rebel stronghold of the Moro Islamic Liberation Front on February 14, 2003. The stronghold is located in Buliok complex in Cotabato and Maguindanao, part of a major offensive on the southern island of Mindanao. After the successful campaign, Luna earned his first star as Brigadier General.

Brig. Gen. Cardozo M. Luna, 56th Commandant of the Philippine Military Academy, changed the required uniforms of the cadets from the West Point-inspired military cut to the rayadillo, the same uniform that was designed by Antonio Luna and was worn by the Filipino forefathers during the Philippine revolution against Spain.

The newly installed Central Command chief, Maj. Gen. Cardozo Luna vowed to reduce the threat posed by the New People's Army, armed wing of the Communist Party of the Philippines, to an "inconsequential level through simultaneous in-depth operations" in the Visayas region (Panay, Negros, Cebu, Bohol, Samar and Leyte). Upon assuming one of the largest military commands in the Philippines in August 2006, Luna issued guidelines for military commanders in the Visayas, that include strengthening of Citizen Armed Force Geographical Unit battalions, implementation of a long range patrol concept and conduct of regular patrols, effective unit leadership, activation of Civil Military Operations Company and task group, and tapping the services of military reservists, police and local government units as well. he always emphasized the respect for human rights in all conduct of military operations.

After a successful stint in the central region of the country in 2006, Eastern Mindanao Command chief, Lt. Gen. Cardozo Luna, together with other top military officials in Mindanao, expressed the need to institutionalize trainings on peace building and conflict management to help bring about peace in the south. However, Luna stressed that peace trainings should be documented and validated by appropriate agencies to see if the trainings and efforts could be replicated by other units. According to Luna, sustaining the peace building efforts should be maintained even after change of commands of military units across the country.

On August 10, 2008, when rogue MILF forces conducted atrocities as a result of the botched Memorandum of Agreement on Ancestral Domain, military troops led by Lt. Gen. Cardozo Luna, Joint Force Mindanao commander, regained control of two Cotabato villages from Moro Islamic Liberation Front rebels and pressed ahead with a massive assault to clear 13 others. The fighting has forced about 130,000 villagers to flee their homes. On August 28, 2008, Luna led the invasion of Camp Bilal, a major Moro Islamic Liberation Front rebel camp in Lanao del Norte, the headquarters of Commander Macapaar, the leader of the attacks on five Lanao del Norte towns. During the 73rd Anniversary Ceremony of the AFP at Camp Aguinaldo on December 22, 2008, the Philippine Legion of Honor (PLOH) degree of Commander was awarded to Luna for leading government troops that fought rogue Moro fighters including the successful campaign at Camp Bilal and the Lanao provinces.

=== Awards in military service ===
- Philippine Republic Presidential Unit Citation
- People Power I Unit Citation
- People Power II Ribbon
- Martial Law Unit Citation
- Distinguished Service Stars
- Officer, Philippine Legion of Honor
- Outstanding Achievement Medals
- Gawad sa Kaunlaran
- Bronze Cross Medal
- Military Merit Medals with two bronze spearhead devices and three bronze anahaws
- Military Commendation Medals
- Military Civic Action Medal
- Sagisag ng Ulirang Kawal
- Long Service Medal
- Anti-dissidence Campaign Medal
- Luzon Anti-Dissidence Campaign Medal
- Visayas Anti-Dissidence Campaign Medal
- Mindanao Anti-Dissidence Campaign Medal
- Disaster Relief and Rehabilitation Operations Ribbon
- Combat Commander's Badge
- Special Forces Qualification Badge

== Diplomatic career ==
Originally set to retire on September 7, 2009, he retired four months early to be the Filipino ambassador to the Netherlands, a post he was appointed to on May 20, 2009. and assumed on August 6, 2009. He was appointed Permanent Representative of the Republic of the Philippines to the Organisation for the Prohibition of Chemical Weapons (OPCW), an international agency, located in The Hague, Netherlands. He also became the Governor of the Common Fund for Commodities, a UN funded organization assisting Third World countries to increase food production.

The Philippine Military Academy Alumni Association, Inc. (PMAAAI), awarded Luna the Cavalier Outstanding Achievement Award in 2010.

On September 30, 2010, Luna left his post in the Netherlands and was ordered to report back to the Philippines.

== Civilian career ==
On May 26, 2012, Cardozo became president and chief executive officer of the Armed Forces and Police Savings & Loan Association (AFPSLAI), a private, non-stock and non-profit savings and loan association established in 1972. It is supervised by the Bangko Sentral ng Pilipinas and provides financial products and allied services to the Armed Forces of the Philippines, Philippine National Police, Bureau of Jail Management and Penology, and Bureau of Fire Protection.

Cardozo was the president and CEO until September 9, 2013. Cardozo remained o the board of trustees as Vice Chairman until June 2016.

== National Defense Undersecretary ==
In July 2016, he was appointed Undersecretary of National Defense.
