= Awards and decorations of the Armed Forces of the Philippines =

Various medals, service ribbons, ribbon devices, and specific badges recognize military service and personal accomplishments of members, and units of the Armed Forces of the Philippines (AFP). Such awards are a means to outwardly display the highlights of a Filipino service member's career, as well as their allies.

== Decorations ==
The following are the authorized individual decorations of the AFP in their order of precedence:

1. Medal of Valor
2. Philippine Legion of Honor
  1. Chief Commander (CCLH)
  2. Grand Commander (GCLH)
  3. Grand Officer (GOLH)
  4. Commander (CLH)
  5. Officer (OLH)
  6. Legionnaire (LLH)
3. Outstanding Achievement Medal
4. Distinguished Conduct Star
5. Distinguished Service Star
6. Gawad sa Kapayapaan
7. Gold Cross
8. Distinguished Aviation Cross
9. Distinguished Navy Cross
10. Silver Cross
11. Meritorious Achievement Medal
12. Distinguished Service Medal
13. Chief of Staff of the AFP Commendation Medal and Ribbon
14. Gawad sa Kaunlaran
15. Bronze Cross
16. Silver Wing Medal
17. Wounded Personnel Medal
18. Military Merit Medal
19. Sagisag ng Ulirang Kawal
20. Military Civic Action Medal
21. Parangal sa Kapanalig ng Sandatahang Lakas ng Pilipinas
22. Military Commendation Medal
23. Armed Forces Conduct Medal
24. Command Reservist (Volunteer) Officer and (Volunteer) Enlisted Personnel of the Year Medal and Ribbon
25. Kagitingan Sa Barangay
  1. Category of Lakan
  2. Category of Datu
  3. Category of Maginoo
26. Civilian Employee's Honorary and Incentive Award
  1. Distinguished Honor Medal
  2. Superior Honor Medal
27. Civilian Merit Medal
28. Annual Efficiency "E" Award for Naval Vessels

Outside the order of precedence:

- ROTC Cadet of the Year Award

== Service Medals and Ribbons ==
The following service medals and ribbons are arranged alphabetically and follow no hierarchy or precedence:

1. American Defense Service Medal (United States)
2. Anti-Dissidence Campaign Medal & Ribbon
  1. Luzon Anti-Dissidence Campaign Medal & Ribbon
  2. Visayan Anti-Dissidence Campaign Medal & Ribbon
  3. Mindanao Anti-Dissidence Campaign Medal & Ribbon
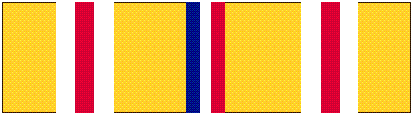
3. Asiatic–Pacific Campaign Medal (United States)
4. Disaster Relief & Rehabilitation Operation Ribbon
5. Kalayaan Island Group Campaign Medal and Ribbon
6. Korean Campaign Medal and Ribbon
7. Long Service Medal
8. Philippine Defense Medal & Ribbon
9. Philippine Independence Medal
10. Philippine Liberation Medal & Ribbon
11. Presidential Security Service Ribbon
12. Resistance Movement Medal
13. United Nations Service Medal & Ribbon
14. Vietnam Service Medal & Ribbon
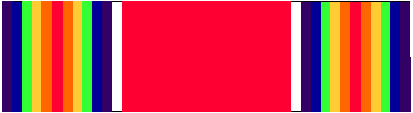
15. World War II Victory Medal (United States)
16. Jolo and Sulu Campaign Medal & Ribbon
17. Northern Maritime Frontier Campaign Medal

== Unit Decorations ==
- Presidential Unit Citation
- Martial Law Unit Citation
- People Power I Unit Citation
- People Power II Unit Citation
- Barangay Presidential Unit Citation Badge (BPUCB)

== Appurtenances (Devices) ==
=== Personal Decorations ===
- Anahaw Leaf Device (for the majority of all individual decorations)
- Equilateral Triangle Device (for the Military Commendation Medal)
- Spearhead Device (for the Military Merit Medal)

=== Service Medals and Ribbons ===
- Service Star

== Badges ==
- AFP Enlisted Personnel of the Year Badge
- AFP ROTC Cadet of the Year Badge
- AFP Civilian Personnel of the Year Badge
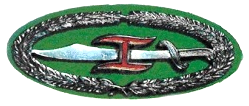
- Combat Commander's (Kagitingan) Badge (CC(K)B)
- PAF Gold Wings Badge
- Command at Sea Badge
- Command Badge (Philippine Marines)
- Marksmanship Badge
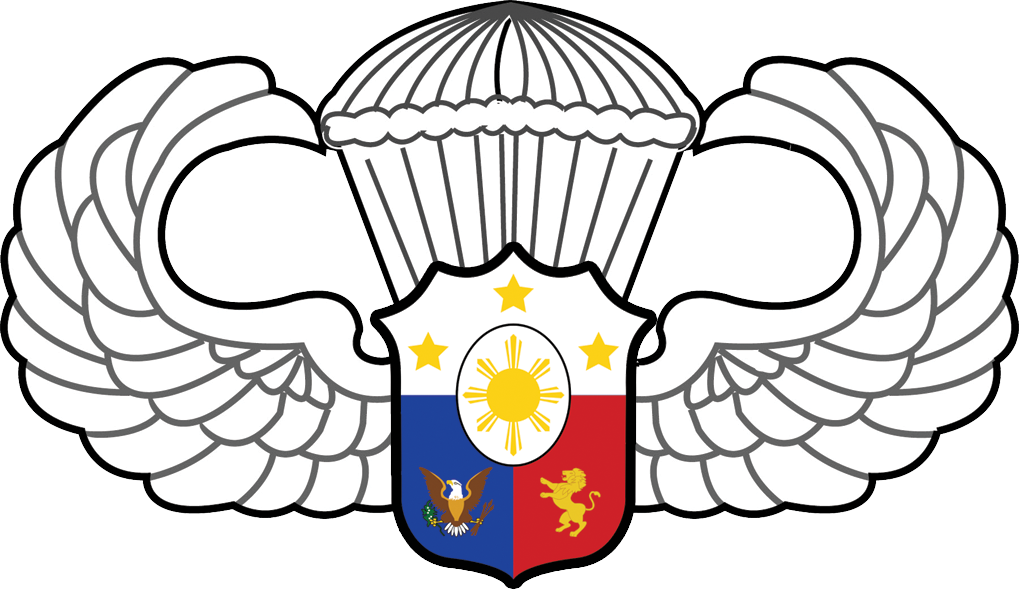
- AFP Parachutist Badge
- Inspector General's Service (IGS) Badge
- Adjutant General's Service (AGS) Badge
- Infantry's Service (Inf) Badge
- Cavalry's Service (Cav) Badge
- Engineer Service (CE) Badge
- Signal Service (SC) Badge
- Artillery's Service (FA) Badge
- Finance's Service Badge
- Ordnance and Chemical's Service (OS) Badge
- Military Intelligence's Service (MI) Badge
- Quartermaster's Service (QMS) Badge
- Medical Corps (MC) Badge
- Nursing Service (NC) Badge
- Corp of Professor Badge
- Veterinary Service (VC) badge
- Psychological Operations (PsyOps) Badge
- Tanglaw Badge
- AFP Home Defense Badge
- PAF Aviation Badge
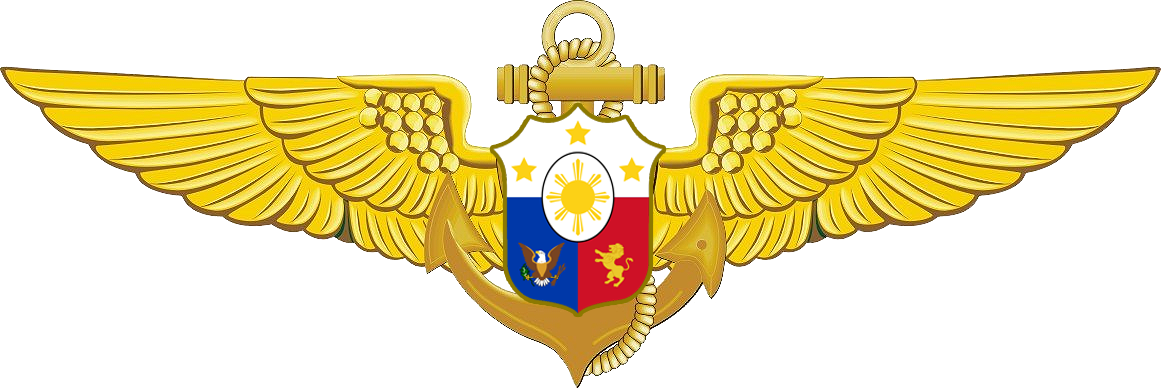
- Naval Aviation Badge
- Avionics/Aircraft Maintenance Officer Specialty Badge
- UOG/Seal Team Badge
- UOG/SCUBA Diver's Badge
- AFP Election Duty Badge
- Enlisted Personnel Administrative Assistant Course (EPAAC) Badge
- Scout Ranger Qualification Badge
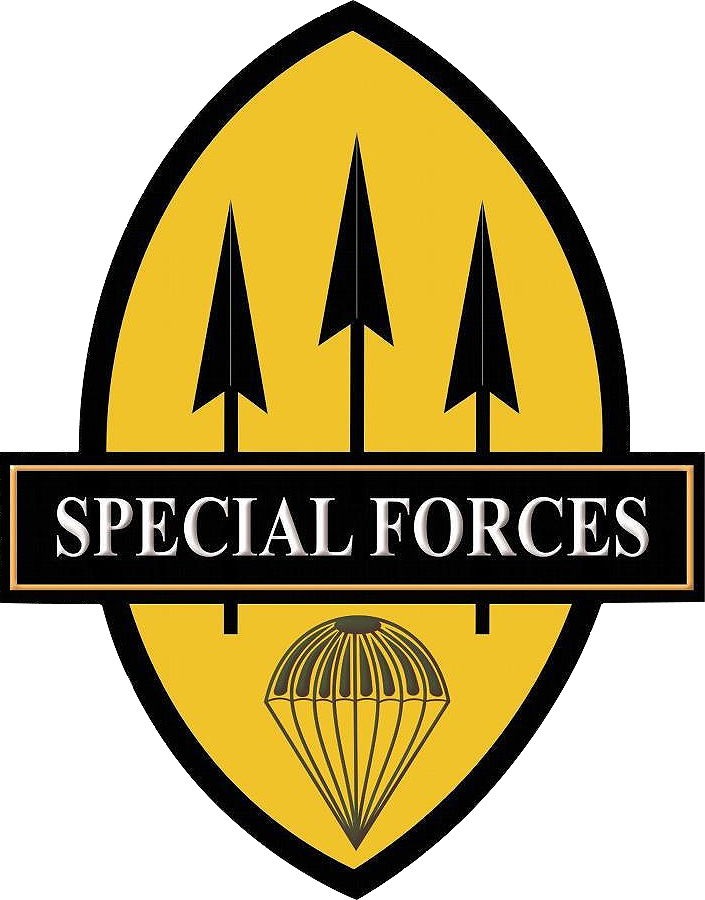
- Special Forces Qualification Badge
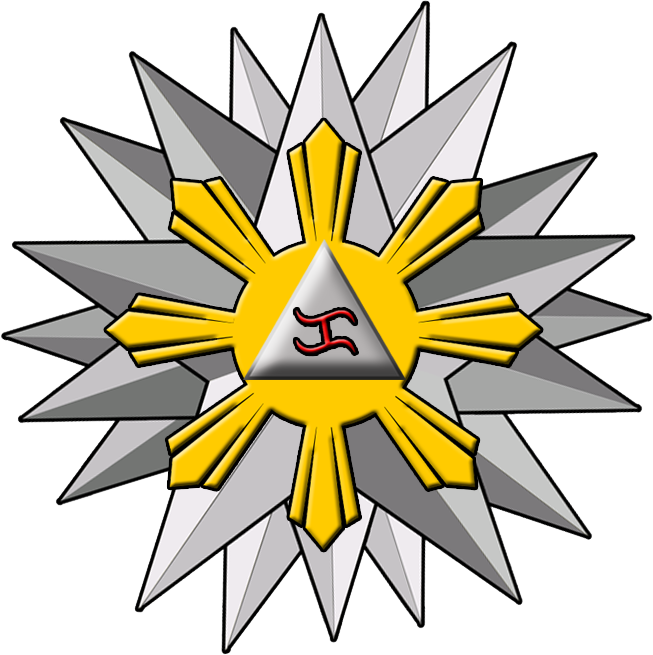
- AFP Command & General Staff Course Badge
- Air to Ground Operations Badge
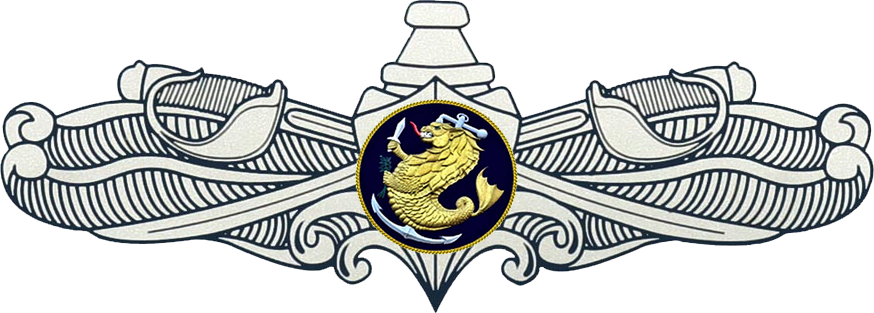
- Naval Surface Warfare Badge
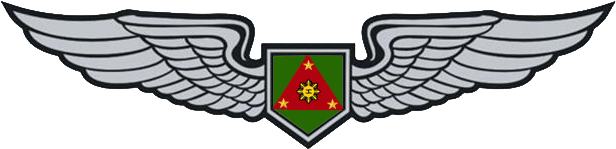
- Army Aviation Badge (Philippines)
- Army Instructor Badge
- Army Readiness Badge
- AFP Drill Master's Badge

== Streamers ==
- Presidential Streamer
- Secretary of Defense Streamer
- Chief of Staff, AFP Streamer
- Commanding General, PA Streamer
- Commanding General, PAF Streamer
- Flag Officer-In-Command, PN Streamer
