= Philippine Medal of Valor =

Philippine Medal of Valor may refer to:

- Armed Forces of the Philippines Medal of Valor, the highest military decoration of the Philippines
- Philippine National Police Medal of Valor, the highest police decoration of the Philippines

== See also ==
- Medal of Valor
