= Parangal sa Kapanalig ng Sandatahang Lakas ng Pilipinas =

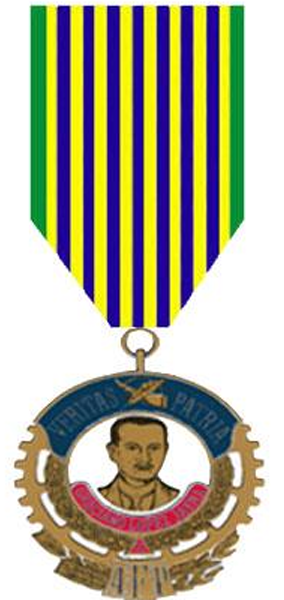
- Parangal sa Kapanalig ng Sandatahang Lakas ng Pilipinas (artist's depiction)
- Type: Military and civilian decoration
- Awarded for: Dedicated service/exemplary achievement/in-volunteering to support the public affairs and civil relations objectives and activities of the AFP
- Country: Philippines
- Presented by: the Chief of Staff of the Armed Forces of the Philippines
- Eligibility: military and civilian personnel of the Armed Forces of the Philippines; mass media/public affairs practitioners in the Philippines; military personnel of allied foreign nations; civilians of the Philippines, and allied foreign nations
- Status: Currently awarded
- Service Ribbon

Precedence
- Next (higher): Military Civic Action Medal
- Next (lower): Military Commendation Medal

The Parangal sa Kapanalig ng Sandatahang Lakas ng Pilipinas (PKSLP) (English: Honorary Ally of the Armed Forces of the Philippines) is a decoration given to military personnel of the AFP, and civilians of the Philippines and allied nations for exemplary support for the AFP's public affairs and civil relations objectives.

== Requirements ==
For a military personnel/civilian to be eligible for the PKSLP, they must have delivered "dedicated service, or exemplary achievement, or in-volunteering to support the public affairs and civil relation objectives and activities of the AFP, especially in the media, and other related fields in public information, and education."

In the context of being awarded of the decoration, the Filipino word Kapanalig will mean "one in ideology", or "advocate of the same principle".

== Description ==
The medal is a semi-oval bronze disc, in shape of a mechanical gear with 12 teeth. At the center of the disc is the relief head of Filipino propagandist Graciano Lopez Jaena. His name is etched on the lower part of the relief inside an enameled red scroll. embracing the relief are seven white lines.

The top of the relief is a royal blue enameled scroll with the Latin words Veritas (Truth), and Patria (Country), written in gold. In the middle of the scroll is a tambuli (a prehistoric Filipino bugle/coronet), and a feathered pen, both in gold also.

The bottom of the relief is wrapped by a Sampaguita wreath with a red triangle in the middle. Inside the triangle is the Baybayin letter ka, symbolizing the Filipino word Kapanalig.

Outside of the relief (i.e. at the very bottom of the medal) are laurel wreaths, laid two in a row, with the letters "AFP" superimposed in the center.

The reverse of the PKSLP is plain.

=== Symbolism and Significance ===
==== Medal ====
Graciano Lopez Jaena - the first Editor of the revolutionary organ La Solidaridad, a prominent figure of the Filipino propaganda movement, which gave motivation for Filipinos to fight for their freedom, culminating in the Revolution of 1896. Jaena represents the responsible use of media to forward a cause beneficial to all (i.e. the Philippines)

Teeth of the gear - 12 months of a year of dedication and service

Sampaguita wreath - recognition for service and achievement

Seven white lines - the Seven Fundamentals of Civil-Military Operations, namely:

- Military Values Education
- Military livelihood enhancement
- Civic Action
- Community Relations
- Public Information
- Psychological Operations, and
- Research and Special Studies

Red triangle - courage and patriotism

Royal blue scroll - freedom

Laurel wreath - honor and greatness

Tambuli, and feathered pen - historical implements used for communication

==== Service Ribbon colors ====
Eight gold stripes - eight rays of the sun found in the Philippine flag, which is officially meant to represent the eight provinces that first revolted against the Spanish during the Revolution of 1896.

Seven blue stripes - democracy, and love of country

Green - the archaic color of the military uniform worn by AFP personnel, representing support for the military establishment

=== Service Ribbon ===
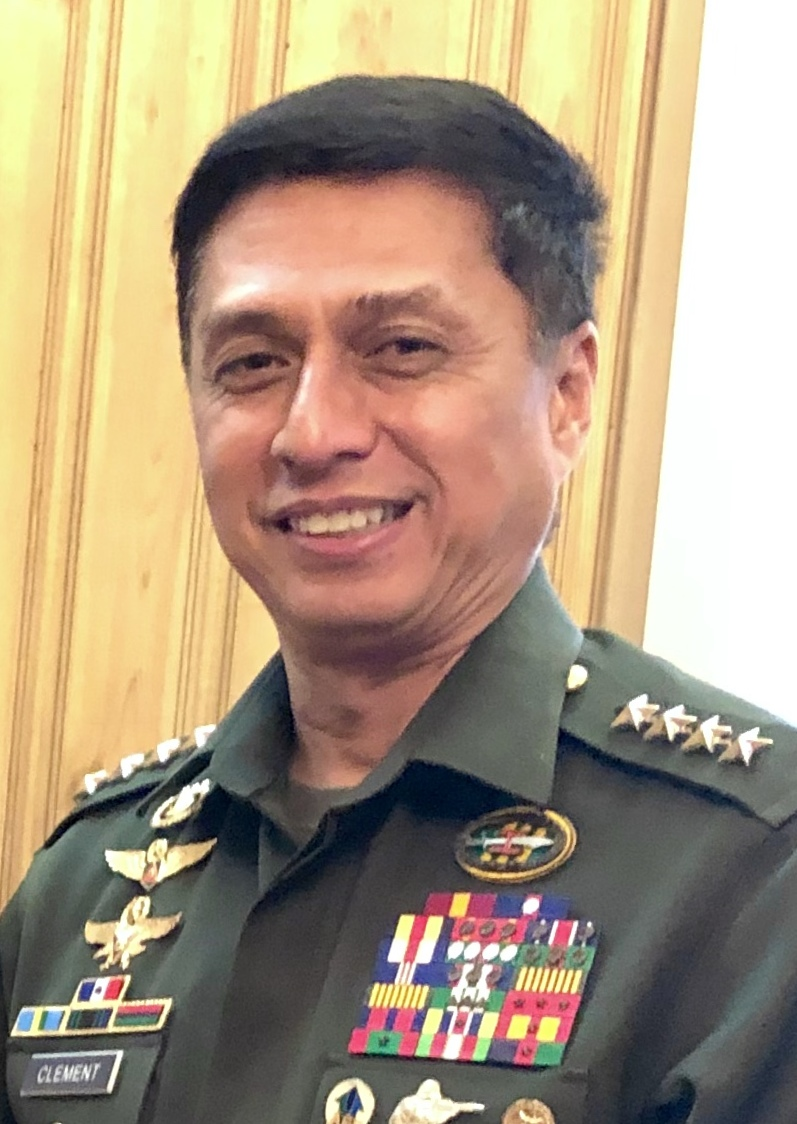
Former AFP Chief of Staff General Noel S. Clement; notice that his medal ribbon rack contains two service ribbons for the Parangal sa Kapanalig ng Sandatahang Lakas ng Pilipinas, denoting two awards.

The ribbon bar for the PKSLP is dominantly in green, superimposed with alternating gold (eight), and royal blue (seven) stripes in the middle. The gold stripes go first, then the royal blue ones next.

There are no appurtenances authorized to be worn with the medal ribbon for the PKSLP; subsequent awards of the PKSLP are instead denoted as a repetition of its service ribbon on the recipient's ribbon rack.

== See also ==
- Civil-military operations
- Awards and decorations of the Armed Forces of the Philippines
