= Chief of Staff of the AFP Commendation Medal and Ribbon =

Chief of Staff AFP Commendation Medal and Ribbon
- Country: Philippines
- Presented by: the Chief of Staff of the Armed Forces of the Philippines
- Eligibility: military, and civilian personnel of the Armed Forces of the Philippines; civilians ofthe Philippines; military personnel, and civilians of allied foreign nations
- Status: Currently Awarded
- Service Ribbon

Precedence
- Next (higher): Distinguished Service Medal (Philippines)
- Next (lower): Gawad sa Kaunlaran

The Chief of Staff of the AFP Commendation Medal and Ribbon (CSCMR) is a decoration awarded by the Armed Forces of the Philippines for meritorious and valuable contributions contributing to the accomplishment of the defense and national security objectives of the AFP establishment.

== Requirements ==
For a military personnel/civilian to be eligible for the CSCMR, they must have served "meritorious and valuable contributions to socio-economic, developmental, and non-combatant activities", and have rendered "exceptional assistance which contributed to the accomplishment of the defense, and national security objectives of the AFP".

Due to its non-combatant nature, the CSCMR is also awarded to the civilian human resource personnel of the AFP, and civilians and dignitaries, local or foreign.

== Description ==
=== Obverse ===
The CSCMR consists of a bronze octagonal medallion. Prominently displayed in the medallion is a portrait of Philippine revolutionary general Artemio Ricarte, with his name written on a scroll, enameled in red. Ricarte's portrait is wrapped with Sampaguita garlands.

The reverse of the CSCMR is plain.

=== Symbolism and Significance ===
General Artemio Ricarte (nom de guerre Vibora (transl. "viper") - considered in historical accounts as the first-ever Chief of Staff of the Armed Forces of the Philippines (tracing its roots back to the Philippine Revolutionary Army, and the revolutionary organization Katipunan); in the context of this award, the recognition of the exceptional contribution made by the recipient

Octagon shape - the eight (8) rays of the Philippine flag

Red scroll - the Philippine Revolution of 1896, where General Ricarte fought

Sampaguita garland - greeting the recipient "Mabuhay!" (transl. long life; "long live"/"may you live long")

=== Service Ribbon ===
The service ribbon for the CSCMR consists of three equally divided segments, depicting the AFP tricolor: light blue (representing the Air Force), navy blue (representing the Navy), and green (representing the Army).

=== Appurtenances ===
Every subsequent award of the CSCMR to an individual shall be appurtenant with an Anahaw Leaf, and is awarded as follows:

- Bronze Anahaw Leaf - for the first, second, third, and fourth succeeding award
- Silver Anahaw Leaf - for every fifth succeeding Bronze Anahaw Leaf
- Gold Anahaw Leaf - for every fifth Silver Anahaw Leaf

These devices are to be worn on the CSCMR's ribbon bar in dress uniforms, with the tips of the leaf pointed upward.

== Manner of Wear ==
The CSCMR is seen to be awarded, and worn in two ways:

- as a badge suspended on a ribbon, pinned on the recipient's left breast pocket upon conferment (the default manner), and
- as a neck order, featuring an enlarged medal suspended on a ribbon necklet.

== See also ==
- Awards and decorations of the Armed Forces of the Philippines
