= AFP Visayas Command =

Philippine Military's unified branch command for Visayas Islands

Coordinates: 10°20′8.46″N 123°54′9.05″E

Visayas Command, AFP
- YOUR SERVANT IN THE VISAYAS
- Active: 01 December 2001 (Celebrated Founding)
- Country: Philippines
- Role: Conventional and Unconventional Warfare, Anti-Guerrilla Operations
- Part of: Under the Armed Forces of the Philippines
- Garrison/HQ: Camp Lapulapu, Barangay Apas, Cebu City
- Nickname: VISCOM
- Patron: St. Jude Thaddaeus
- Mottos: "Committed to Serve for Lasting Peace and Progress in the Visayas"
- Anniversaries: 01 December
- Engagements: Internal Security Operations or Anti-guerilla operations against the NPA and local criminal elements
- Website: www.centcomafp.com

Commanders
- Current commander: LtGen. Fernando M. Reyeg, PA
- Notable commanders: Maj. Gen. Victor S. Ibrado AFP; Maj. Gen. Romulo F. Yap AFP; Maj. Gen. Jaime S. De Los Santos AFP; Maj. Gen. Julius L. Javier AFP; Lt. Gen. Emmanuel R. Teodosio AFP; Lt. Gen. Samuel B. Bagasin AFP; Lt. Gen. Cardozo M. Luna AFP; Maj. Gen. Victor A. Mayo AFP; Lt. Gen. Dionisio R. Santiago AFP; Lt. Gen. Oscar T. Lactao AFP; Lt. Gen. Roberto T. Ancan PA

Insignia
- Identification symbol: Central Command Emblem

The Visayas Command (abbrv. as VISCOM) is the Armed Forces of the Philippines' combatant command in charge of all the visayas islands. It is responsible for the defense of these areas against external aggression, as well as combating terrorism and insurgency. It was formerly known as the Central Command (CENTCOM) before being effectively renamed on 11 August 2021 based on the approved memorandum from the Department of National Defense.

== History ==
On May 17, 1942, the 3rd Military Area (3MA), the original unit of the present-day Visayas Command, was organized and activated as a wartime military unit under the United States Armed Forces in the Far East (USAFFE) to provide an effective defense against the Japanese invaders. The 3MA provided command and control to all allied forces including Filipino scouts and guerillas in the Visayas and Mindanao region. Its headquarters then was at Camp Guadalupe in what is now Barangay Guadalupe. After the war, the 3MA was transferred to its present location in Camp Lapulapu in what was then the Lahug District of Cebu City. The foundation of the present Barangay Apas and the subsequent evolution of neighboring barangays into highly urbanized areas took their roots from the establishment of Camp Lapulapu. From being the 3MA Headquarters, the place metamorphosed into several military headquarters after the Second World War. It was the Battalion Combat Team in the 1950s and then later as CEMCOM that covered the Mindanao military operation during the Muslim rebellion in the 1970s. Later, the place became home of the 3rd Brigade Separate with former President Fidel V Ramos then as a Philippine Army general, serving as one of its commanders prior to his stint as a PC Chief. Subsequently, the area became home to the 3rd Infantry Division (3ID) of the Philippine Army in 1975. Further reorganization of the AFP in the late 80s, transferred the 3ID to Jamindan, Capiz, and the subsequent creation of the Regional Unified Command (RUC). The RUC later merged with other regional commands to form the Visayas Command (VISCOM). VISCOM was organized as an operating unit of the AFP to control Internal Security Operation (ISO) in the Visayas, which then became the forefather of the present-day Central Command (CENTCOM), AFP.

On August 11, 2021, the name of the Central Command was reverted to its original name as the Visayas Command.

== Lineage of Commanders ==
- BGen. Jesus R. Hermosa, AFP – (29 March 1988 – 14 December 1988)
- BGen. Rolando Q. Antonio, AFP – (14 December 1988 – 8 July 1989)
- BGen. Renato V. Palma, AFP – (8 July 1989 – 28 January 1990)
- MGen. Romeo R. Zulueta, AFP – (28 January 1990 – 26 December 1992)
- MGen. Thelmo Y. Cunanan, AFP – (26 December 1992 – 24 August 1993)
- MGen. Romulo F. Yap, AFP – (24 August 1993 – 12 April 1994)
- MGen. Ruperto A. Ambil, AFP – (12 April 1994 – 8 August 1995)
- MGen. Renato M. Garcia, AFP – (8 August 1995 – 26 June 1997)
- MGen. Jose C. Lapus, AFP – (26 June 1997 – 1 June 1998)
- MGen. Victor A. Mayo, AFP – (29 July 1998 – 11 April 1999)
- MGen. Victor U. Garcia, AFP – (9 June 1998 – 21 July 1998)
- MGen. Victor U. Garcia, AFP – (5 May 1999 – 27 October 1999)
- MGen. Santos B. Gabison Jr., AFP – (27 October 1999 – 23 May 2000)
- MGen. Julius L. Javier, AFP – (23 May 2000 – 12 August 2000)
- MGen. Jaime S. De Los Santos, AFP – (23 May 2000 – 23 October 2000)
- RAdm. Napoleon C. Baylon, AFP – (23 October 2000 – 3 March 2001)
- MGen. Julius L. Javier, AFP – (3 March 2001 – 17 July 2001)
- LtGen. Dionisio R. Santiago, AFP – (17 July 2001 – 13 April 2002)
- LtGen. Jacinto C. Ligot, AFP – (13 April 2002 – 17 August 2004)
- LtGen. Emmanuel R. Teodosio, AFP – (17 August 2004 – 21 January 2006)
- LtGen. Samuel B. Bagasin, AFP – (21 January 2006 – 2 August 2006)
- LtGen. Cardozo M. Luna, AFP – (2 August 2006 – 30 August 2007)
- MGen. Victor S Ibrado, AFP – (30 August 2007 – 16 May 2008)
- LtGen. Pedro Ike I. Inserto, AFP – (16 May 2008 – 21 January 2009)
- LtGen. Armando L. Cunanan, AFP – (21 January 2009 – 16 June 2009)
- LtGen. Isagani C. Cachuela, AFP – (16 June 2009 – to 2 November 2009)
- LtGen. Ralph A. Villanueva, AFP – (2 November 2009 – 17 August 2012)
- MGen. Jose Z. Mabanta Jr., PA – (17 August 2012 – 1 October 2012) (acting)
- RAdm. Jose Luis Alano, AFP – (1 October 2012 – 19 December 2012)
- MGen. Jose Z. Mabanta Jr., PA – (19 December 2012 – 12 January 2013) (acting)
- VAdm. Edgar L. Abogado, AFP – (12 January 2013 – 8 April 2013)
- LtGen. Roy O. Deveraturda, AFP – (8 April 2013 – 2 December 2013)
- LtGen. John S. Bonafos, AFP – (2 December 2013 – 15 August 2014)
- LtGen. Nicanor M. Vivar, AFP – (15 August 2014 – 12 August 2016)
- LtGen. Raul L. Del Rosario, AFP – (12 August 2016 – 5 December 2016)
- LtGen. Oscar T. Lactao, AFP – (5 December 2016 – 8 December 2017)
- LtGen. Paul T. Atal, AFP – (8 December 2017 – 22 November 2018)
- LtGen. Noel S. Clement, AFP – (22 November 2018 – 24 September 2019)
- MGen. Dinoh A. Dolina, PA – (24 September 2019 – 31 October 2019) (acting)
- LtGen. Roberto T. Ancan, AFP – (31 October 2019 – August 21, 2021)
- MGen. Pio Q. Diñoso III, PA – (21 August 2021 – 23 September 2021) (acting)
- LtGen. Robert C. Dauz, AFP – (23 September 2021 – 14 November 2022)
- LtGen. Benedict M. Arevalo, PA '(14 November 2022 – 03 March 2024)'
- Cdre. Oscar D. Canlas Jr. (03 March 2024 - 24 April 2024)
- LtGen. Fernando M. Rayag '(24 April 2024 - present)'

== Organization ==
The following are the units that are under the Visayas Command.

- 3rd Infantry Division, PA
- 8th Infantry Division, PA
- Tactical Operations Wing Central, PAF
- Naval Forces Central, PN
- 53rd Engineer Brigade, PA
- 4th CEISG, CEISSAFP
- 3rd Civil Relations Group, CRSAFP
- Military Intelligence Groups (6,7, and 8), ISAFP

== Operations ==
- Anti-guerrilla operations against the New People's Army
- Anti-terrorist operations against known terror groups operating in their AOR.
