= Armed Forces Conduct Medal =

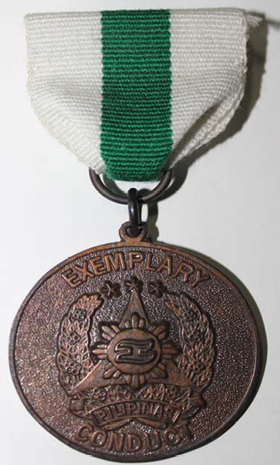
- The Armed Forces Conduct Medal
- Type: Military decoration
- Awarded for: Serving two successive enlistment terms without record of punishment or disciplinary action
- Country: Philippines
- Presented by: the Armed Forces of the Philippines
- Eligibility: Enlisted personnel of the Armed Forces of the Philippines
- Status: Currently Awarded
- Service Ribbon

Precedence
- Next (higher): Military Commendation Medal
- Next (lower): Reserve Officer (Volunteer) and Enlisted Personnel (Volunteer) of the Year Medal and Ribbon

The Armed Forces Conduct Medal (AFCM) is a military decoration of the Armed Forces of the Philippines. It is awarded to enlisted personnel from the four major branches of service (the Army, the Navy, the Air Force, and the Marine Corps) for serving two successive enlistment terms without records of disciplinary action.

== Requirements ==
For an enlisted service member (with the pay grades of E-1 to E-9) to receive the AFCM, they must have "two successive enlistment terms with no record of punishment, conviction, or derogatory information whatsoever".

In the AFP, an "enlistment term" usually lasts for three (3) years, up until then EPs can be subject to re-enlistment. As per Republic Act 11709 (the AFP Professionalism Law) enacted April 13, 2022, EPs shall compulsory retire from service upon accumulation of 30 years of satisfactory active duty (i.e. ten enlistment terms), or when they turn 56 years old, whichever comes first.

This is the Filipino equivalent of the Good Conduct Medals issued to enlisted personnel of the US Armed Forces.

== Description ==
=== Obverse ===
The AFCM is a circular disc made of bronze, which simply consists of the seal of the Armed Forces of the Philippines, and the words "EXEMPLARY" and "CONDUCT" arched on top, and at the bottom of the seal, respectively.

=== Reverse ===
The seals of the four major branches of service of the AFP are depicted in relief, starting with the oldest service in clockwise (i.e. the Army [1897], the Navy, [1898], the Air Force [1947], and the Marine Corps [1950]).

=== Service Ribbon ===
The ribbon for the AFCM is plain white, with a broad green stripe in the middle.

=== Appurtenances ===
Every subsequent award of the AFCM to an individual shall be appurtenant with an Anahaw Leaf, and is awarded as follows:

- Bronze Anahaw Leaf - for the first, second, third, and fourth succeeding award
- Silver Anahaw Leaf - for every fifth succeeding Bronze Anahaw Leaf
- Gold Anahaw Leaf - for every fifth Silver Anahaw Leaf; this, in effect, is the last allowed appurtenance for this medal, as enlisted personnel can only serve ten enlistment terms (30 years).

These devices are to be worn on the AFCM's ribbon bar in dress uniforms, with the tips of the leaf pointed upward.

== See also ==
- Awards and decorations of the Armed Forces of the Philippines
