= Army Aviation Badge (Philippines) =

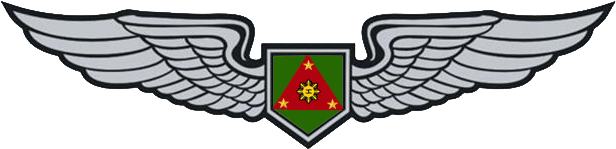
- Army Aviation Pilot's Badge (Basic)
- Type: Military Badge
- Awarded for: successful completion of the Aviator's Basic Course conducted by the Philippine Air Force or any Aviation Academy recognized by the Philippine Army
- Country: Philippines
- Presented by: the Commander, Aviation "Hiraya" Regiment, Philippine Army
- Eligibility: commissioned officers; enlisted personnel; local and foreign civilians and dignitaries (honorary)
- Status: Currently Awarded
- Established: 1986
- First award: 1986
- Final award: Ongoing
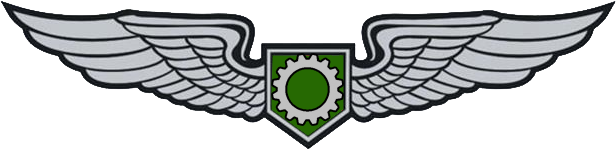
- Army Aviation Enlisted Aircrew Badge (Basic)
- Related: United States Aviator Badge

The Philippine Army Aviation Badge is a military skill badge awarded by the Philippine Army. The badge is awarded to military personnel who qualify as military aviators and aircrew and are attached to the Army's Aviation "Hiraya" Regiment.

== Requirements ==
The PA Aviation Badge comes in two types:

The Army Aviation Pilot's Badge is awarded to commissioned officers, and enlisted personnel of the Army who qualify as military aviators (i.e. pilots) who shall operate the various air assets of the Army's Aviation "Hiraya" Regiment, or to anyone in the other service branches of the AFP attached to the same regiment.

Enlisted personnel who qualify as aircrew (i.e. mechanics) supporting the aviators, can earn the Army Aviation Enlisted Aircrew Badge.

It can also be conferred as an honorary award to civilian personnel, as well as foreign and local dignitaries.

== Description ==
=== Pilot's Badge ===
The badge for the lowest level, the Basic Army Aviation Pilot, consists of the pentagonal seal of the Philippine Army (a green pentagon with a red triangle; the three stars and the sun of the Philippine flag are inside the triangle, with the Baybayin letter ka inside the sun) flanked a pair of silver wings.

Similar to the AFP Parachutist's Badge, subsequent awards of the Pilot's Badge are appurtenant the addition of a silver five-pointed star on top of the Army seal (Senior Army Aviation Pilot), and then a silver laurel wreath wrapped around the star (Master Army Aviation Pilot).

=== Enlisted Aircrew Badge ===
The badge for the lowest level, the Basic Army Aviation Enlisted Aircrew Badge, has a resemblance with the aforementioned Pilot's Badge; the difference being that the seal of the Army is replaced with a mechanical gear inside the enameled green pentagon.

The same appurtenances for the Pilot's Badge are also applicable with the Enlisted Aircrew Badge: a five-pointed silver star (Senior Army Aviation Enlisted Aircrew Badge), and the silver laurel wreath wrapped around the star (Master Army Aviation Enlisted Aircrew Badge).

== Gallery ==
Variations of the Army Aviation Badge (Pilot, and Aircrew)

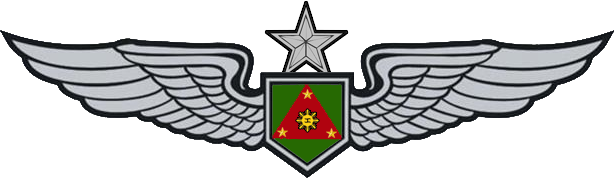
Army Aviation Pilot's Badge (Senior)

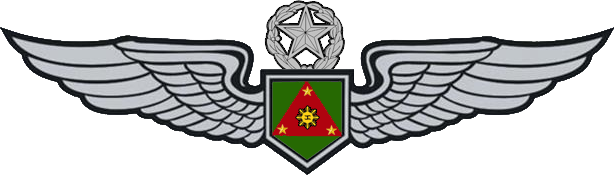
Army Aviation Pilot's Badge (Master)

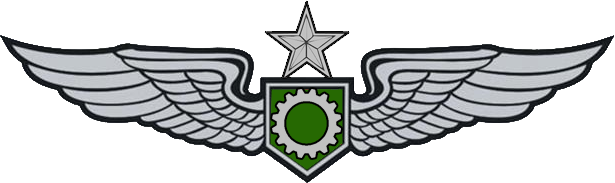
Army Aviation Enlisted Aircrew's Badge (Senior)

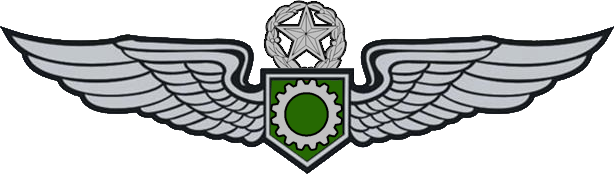
Army Aviation Enlisted Aircrew's Badge (Master)

== See also ==
- Awards and decorations of the Armed Forces of the Philippines
