= Philippine National Police Medal of Valor =

- PNP Medal of Valor on neck ribbon
- Type: Philippine police medal with neck ribbon
- Awarded for: Conspicuous gallantry and intrepidity at the risk of life and limb above and beyond the call of duty.
- Description: The medal is a golden cross with triangle at the center. Inside the triangle are three stars. Projected around the cross is a sampaguita wreath.
- Presented by: Republic of the Philippines
- Eligibility: Philippine National Police personnel only
- Status: Currently awarded
- Established: 23 September 1993

Precedence
- Next (higher): None
- Next (lower): PNP Distinguished Conduct Medal

The Philippine National Police Medal of Valor (Filipino: Medalya ng Kagitingan), also called the PNP Medal of Valor is the Philippine National Police's highest honor awarded for "a deed of personal bravery and self-sacrifice above and beyond the call of duty so conspicuous as to distinguish himself clearly above his comrades in the performance of more than ordinary hazardous service."

The medal is awarded by the President of the Philippines to members of the Philippine National Police.
