= Meritorious Achievement Medal =

Philippine military award

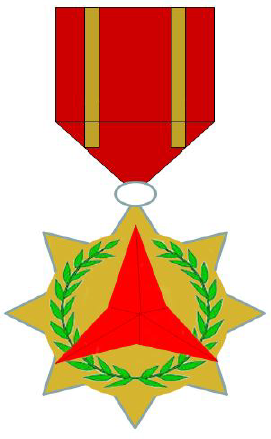
- Meritorious Achievement Medal (artist's impression)
- Type: Decoration
- Awarded for: "valuable and revered achievements in various fields related to national defense and/or public service"
- Country: Philippines
- Presented by: the Chief of Staff of the Armed Forces of the Philippines
- Eligibility: military and civilian personnel of the Armed Forces of the Philippines; citizens of the Philippines, and of allied nations
- Status: Currently Awarded
- Service Ribbon

Precedence
- Next (higher): Silver Cross
- Next (lower): Distinguished Service Medal

The Meritorious Achievement Medal (MAM) is a decoration awarded by the Armed Forces of the Philippines for valuable and revered achievements related to national defense and public service.

== Requirements ==
For a military personnel/civilian to be eligible for the MAM, they must have delivered "valuable and revered achievements in the advancement of science, or in socio-economic, technical, or military fields related to national defense, or public service that merit recognition to a lesser degree than the Outstanding Achievement Medal".

The MAM is usually awarded en masse to certain groups and military units who have performed the achievement in unison, representing the entire group/unit. The most recent example being the conferment of the MAM to the Philippine Army personnel who were members of the Philippine Inter-Agency Humanitarian Contingent sent by the Philippine government to assist in rescue efforts during the 2025 Myanmar earthquake.

== Description ==
=== Obverse ===
The MAM consists of an eight-pointed sun in gold. Inside the sun is a laurel wreath enameled in green, superimposed with a three-pointed star, enameled in red.

=== Reverse ===
At the back of the sun, the words "MERITORIOUS ACHIEVEMENT" is written in two lines.

=== Symbolism and Significance ===
==== Medal ====
Sun - glory for the added recognition each achievement brings for the AFP, and the nation

Laurel wreath - triumph and honor of the recipient

Three-pointed red star - the act/deed/achievement being recognized

==== Service Ribbon colors ====
Red - strength and determination

Golden yellow - wisdom and prestige

=== Service Ribbon ===
The service ribbon for the MAM is in red, with two thin golden yellow stripes on each side.

=== Appurtenances ===
Every subsequent award of the MAM to an individual shall be appurtenant with an Anahaw Leaf, and is awarded as follows:

- Bronze Anahaw Leaf - for the first, second, third, and fourth succeeding award
- Silver Anahaw Leaf - for every fifth succeeding Bronze Anahaw Leaf
- Gold Anahaw Leaf - for every fifth Silver Anahaw Leaf

These devices are to be worn on the MAM's ribbon bar in dress uniforms, with the tips of the leaf pointed upward.

== Manner of Wear ==
The MAM is seen to be awarded, and worn in two ways:

- as a badge suspended on a ribbon, pinned on the recipient's left breast pocket upon conferment (the default manner), and
- as a neck order, featuring an enlarged medal suspended on a ribbon necklet.

== See also ==
- Awards and decorations of the Armed Forces of the Philippines
- Outstanding Achievement Medal
