= Gawad sa Kapayapaan =

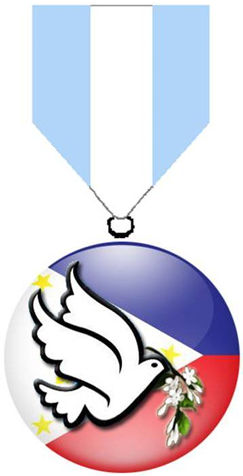
- Gawad Sa Kapayapaan Medal (artist's impression)
- Type: Decoration
- Awarded for: outstanding services to internal peace and security
- Country: Philippines
- Presented by: the Chief of Staff of the Armed Forces of the Philippines
- Eligibility: Members of the Armed Forces of the Philippines; any citizen of the Philippines; any citizen of friendly foreign nations
- Status: Currently awarded
- Service Ribbon

Precedence
- Next (higher): Distinguished Service Star
- Next (lower): Gold Cross

The Gawad sa Kapayapaan (GSK) (transl. "Award for Peace") is a decoration of the Armed Forces of the Philippines (AFP) which recognizes outstanding services to internal peace and security.

== Requirements ==
The recipient "must have proffered valuable contribution in promoting societal understanding and reconciliation or must have made exceptional achievement in pursuit of national accord and development". The conferment of the award is although limited to non-combat activities, and is only given individually, compared to other awards which can be given to individuals as part of a unit.

== Description ==
=== Obverse ===
The award is a circular medal showing a portion of the Philippine flag, in enamel. A white flying dove (also enameled) with a Sampaguita branch in its beak is superimposed on the medal.

The reverse of the GSK is plain.

=== Symbolism and Significance ===
Circular shape of the medal - desire of citizens to achieve common good and peaceful existence

Dove - emblem of peace.

Sampaguita branch - restoration of peace, which is progressively realized through each and every notable deed accomplished by a recipient

Philippine flag - the Filipino people, in general

=== Service Ribbon ===
The ribbon is light blue in color with a thick white line in the middle.

=== Appurtenances ===
Every subsequent award of the GSK to an individual shall be appurtenant with an Anahaw Leaf, and is awarded as follows:

- Bronze Anahaw Leaf - for the first, second, third, and fourth succeeding award
- Silver Anahaw Leaf - for every fifth succeeding Bronze Anahaw Leaf
- Gold Anahaw Leaf - for every fifth Silver Anahaw Leaf

These devices are to be worn on the GSK's ribbon bar in dress uniforms, with the tips of the leaf pointed upward.

== Notable Recipients ==
- 2LT Gianmatteo Vittorio F Guidicelli, MNSA, PA(Res) - actor; conferred June 9, 2026
