= Silver Cross (Philippines) =

- Type: Decoration
- Awarded for: distinguished achievement/heroism in the conduct of intelligence operations or other special operations not involving armed confrontations with the enemy
- Country: Philippines
- Presented by: Philippines
- Eligibility: Members of the Armed Forces of the Philippines
- Status: Currently awarded

Precedence
- Next (higher): Distinguished Aviation Cross; Distinguished Navy Cross
- Next (lower): Meritorious Achievement Medal

The Silver Cross (SC) is a non-combat decoration of the Armed Forces of the Philippines which recognizes "distinguished achievement or heroism in the conduct of intelligence operations not involving armed confrontations with the enemy".

== Requirements and Merits ==
The Silver Cross, being a relatively new award of the AFP formulated in the early 2000 to bridge a gap between the Gold Cross and the Military Merit Medal, often recognize officers and enlisted personnel who demonstrate strategic acumen in anti-insurgency campaigns and internal security efforts, highlighting its role in honoring sustained contributions to national defense without direct combat engagement.

In response to contemporary conflict, such as the Marawi Siege, the eligibility of the SC was expanded to honor logistical and special operations heroism without direct combat.

== Description ==
=== Obverse ===
The award is a silver cross surrounded by a garland consisting of two laurel leaves. A silver bar is superimposed on the horizontal section of the cross with the word "HEROISM."

The reverse of the SC is plain.

=== Symbolism and Significance ===
Cross - the risk of life and sacrifice displayed in the accomplishment of extraordinary feats warranting the SC

Laurel wreath - the honor that is given to the recipient

=== Service Ribbon ===
The ribbon is olive drab in color and has two small silver lines at the center, denoting it as the second-highest cross-shaped medal in the AFP, just below the Gold Cross Medal.

=== Appurtenances ===
Every subsequent award of the SC to an individual shall be appurtenant with an Anahaw Leaf, and is awarded as follows:

- Bronze Anahaw Leaf - for the first, second, third, and fourth succeeding award
- Silver Anahaw Leaf - for every fifth succeeding Bronze Anahaw Leaf
- Gold Anahaw Leaf - for every fifth Silver Anahaw Leaf

These devices are to be worn on the SC's ribbon bar in dress uniforms, with the tips of the leaf pointed upward.
