= Distinguished Conduct Star =

- The AFP Distinguished Conduct Star Medal and Ribbon
- Type: Decoration: neck medal
- Awarded for: Conspicuous acts of gallantry in the presence of an armed enemy
- Country: Philippines
- Presented by: the Chief of Staff of the Armed Forces of the Philippines
- Eligibility: Members of the Armed Forces of the Philippines and friendly allied forces
- Motto: For Gallantry
- Status: Currently awarded
- Established: 1925 (as the Philippine Constabulary Distinguished Conduct Star); 1939 (as the Distinguished Conduct Star)
- First award: 1939 (current incarnation)
- Service Ribbon

Precedence
- Next (higher): Medal of Valor (military); Outstanding Achievement Medal (military/civilian)
- Next (lower): Distinguished Service Star

The Distinguished Conduct Star (DCS) is the second highest military award of the Philippines, preceded only by the Medal of Valor. It is awarded for conspicuous courage and gallantry in the face of an armed enemy.

== History ==
The award was established on October 17, 1925, under Philippine Constabulary General Order 24, as the Philippine Constabulary Distinguished Conduct Star, initially as a decoration for Filipino and American personnel during the Insular era. In 1939, under the Commonwealth era, it was simply named the Distinguished Conduct Star and was now awarded to regular Army personnel.

Such lineage makes the DCS one of the oldest decorations in the Philippine military.

== Requirements ==
This decoration is awarded to a person who, while serving in any capacity with the Armed Forces of the Philippines, distinguishes themselves by an extraordinary act of heroism not justifying the award of a Medal of Valor; while engaged in military operations involving conflict with an armed enemy. The act or acts of heroism warranting of the DCS must have been "so notable and have involved risk of life so extraordinary as to set the individual apart from his or her comrades".

== Description ==
Throughout its history, it has undergone seven design changes (or "Types"), leading to the current incarnation, used as an independent nation.

Type 2 DCSs are struck by Aquino and Sons during the Commonwealth era. Type 4 DCSs were struck by Angel Zamora, a local medal maker, while Type 5 DCSs were made by El Oro, a government-accredited Pasig-based engraver founded by Jose Tupaz, Jr. The current version of the DCS is called the Type 7.

=== Obverse ===
The medal for the DCS, as the name of the award would indicate, is in the form of a downward pointing five-point star with somewhat-curved rays, in red enamel. The star is superimposed on a Sampaguita garland.

Centered on the star is a golden disc, containing the relief of a gold heraldic sea lion, holding a dagger in the dexter hand. It sits on the muzzles of two cannons, which occupy the sinister and dexter flanks. Two bows are at the base of the disc and rest horizontally across arrows between the breeches of the two cannons. Spears are placed vertically point up and superimposed over the crossed arrows. The star is attached to a golden bar with the words "FOR GALLANTRY" embossed on it. The bar is attached to the base of a Sampaguita wreath with white flower buds and green leaves; it is in this wreath that the entirety of the medal is suspended towards its ribbon.

The DCS is conferred to the recipient as a neck medal, akin to other major decorations such as the Medal of Valor.

=== Reverse ===
Following the arc of the Sampaguita garland, the phrase "FOR DISTINGUISHED CONDUCT" is written.

=== Symbolism and Significance ===
Bow and arrows; cannons - the strong defense made by the recipient for the welfare of the nation

Red star - heroism and gallantry displayed in the face of an armed enemy

Sampaguita garland - high honors for the acts displayed warranting the DCS

Sampaguita wreath - glorious victory/accomplishments conspicuously done

=== Service Ribbon ===
The award is suspended from a red ribbon with the blue vertical stripe at the center, opposite to the orientation and colors of the ribbon for the Distinguished Service Star, which is below the DCS in precedence.

=== Appurtenances ===
Every subsequent award of the DCS to an individual shall be appurtenant with an Anahaw Leaf, and is awarded as follows:

- Bronze Anahaw Leaf - for the first, second, third, and fourth succeeding award
- Silver Anahaw Leaf - for every fifth succeeding Bronze Anahaw Leaf
- Gold Anahaw Leaf - for every fifth Silver Anahaw Leaf

These devices are to be worn on the DCS's ribbon bar in dress uniforms, with the tips of the leaf pointed upward.

== See also ==
- Awards and decorations of the Armed Forces of the Philippines
