= Distinguished Service Medal (Philippines) =

Philippine military award

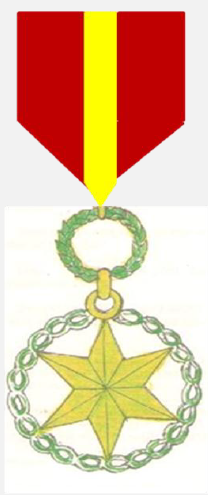
- Distinguished Service Medal (artist's impression)
- Awarded for: honorable and valuable service in a position of major responsibility not warranting of the Distinguished Service Star
- Country: Philippines
- Presented by: the Chief of Staff of the Armed Forces of the Philippines
- Eligibility: Commissioned officers of the AFP (pay grades of O-1 to O-6); Senior non-commissioned officers (pay grades of E-8 to E-10)
- Status: Currently Awarded

Precedence
- Next (higher): Meritorious Achievement Medal
- Next (lower): Chief of Staff of the AFP Commendation Medal and Ribbon
- Related: Distinguished Service Star

The Distinguished Service Medal (DSM) is a decoration awarded by the Armed Forces of the Philippines for performance of duty in a position of major responsibility not warranting the conferment of highest award for honorable service, the Distinguished Service Star.

== Requirements ==
The Distinguished Service Medal is given to officers of the four major branches of service in the AFP (with pay grades from O-1 to O-6), as well as senior non-commissioned officers (with pay grades from E-8 to E-10) in major positions/commands.

For officers, they must have delivered "honorable and valuable service in a position of major responsibility but to a lesser extent not warranting the award for the Distinguished Service Star (DSS)". The DSS is the AFP's highest award for recognition of honorable service and is exclusive to commissioned officers; this makes the DSM secondary to it.

For senior non-commissioned officers, such as Command Master Sergeants (Army, Air Force, and Marine Corps) and Senior/Master Chief Petty Officers (Navy), they must have "displayed a level of service that warrants an award of such magnitude". This makes the DSM the highest award for recognition of honorable service for personnel with such ranks.

Recipients, regardless of rank, must not be relieved for cause (i.e. not having any derogatory records throughout the career period before being nominated for conferment of the award).

== Description ==
=== Obverse ===
The DSM consists of a six-pointed gold-plated bronze star, surrounded by a laurel garland composed of 12 pairs of leaves on each size. It is suspended to its service ribbon on top with a Sampaguita wreath.

=== Reverse ===
At the back of the outline of the star, the words "HONORABLE SERVICE" are written in two lines.

=== Symbolism and Significance ===
Six-pointed star - honorable and valuable service rendered in a position of major responsibility

Sampaguita wreath - the honor given for such reputable and respectable service displayed

=== Service Ribbon ===
The service ribbon for the DSM is in red with a broad yellow stripe on the center.

=== Appurtenances ===
Every subsequent award of the DSM to an individual shall be appurtenant with an Anahaw Leaf, and is awarded as follows:

- Bronze Anahaw Leaf - for the first, second, third, and fourth succeeding award
- Silver Anahaw Leaf - for every fifth succeeding Bronze Anahaw Leaf
- Gold Anahaw Leaf - for every fifth Silver Anahaw Leaf

These devices are to be worn on the DSM's ribbon bar in dress uniforms, with the tips of the leaf pointed upward.

== Manner of Wear ==
The DSM is seen to be awarded, and worn in two ways:

- as a badge suspended on a ribbon, pinned on the recipient's left breast pocket upon conferment (the default manner), and
- as a neck order, featuring an enlarged medal suspended on a ribbon necklet.

== See also ==
- Awards and decorations of the Armed Forces of the Philippines
- Distinguished Service Star
