= Gawad sa Kaunlaran =

- The Gawad sa Kaunlaran Medal and Ribbon
- Type: Decoration
- Awarded for: "...conspicuously meritorious and valuable achievement in the pursuit of socio-economic and other non-combat activities, or for conspicuously exceptional~ service which contributed immensely in accomplishing the peaceful objectives of the AFP, or in improving the quality of life of the people within the military establishment."
- Country: Philippines
- Presented by: the Chief of Staff of the Armed Forces of the Philippines
- Eligibility: Members of the AFP; any citizen of the Philippines
- Status: Currently Awarded
- Gawad sa Kaunlaran ribbon bar

Precedence
- Next (higher): Distinguished Service Medal (Philippines)
- Next (lower): Bronze Cross Medal (military); Military Civic Action Medal (civilian)

The Gawad sa Kaunlaran (GSK) (English: Award in Development) is a decoration awarded by the Armed Forces of the Philippines to military personnel, and citizens of the Philippines for meritorious and valuable socio-economic service.

It is the second highest distinction presented by the AFP to civilians and government officials.

== Requirements ==
It is awarded for "...conspicuously meritorious and valuable achievement in the pursuit of socio-economic and other non-combat activities, or for conspicuously exceptional~ service which contributed immensely in accomplishing the peaceful objectives of the AFP, or in improving the quality of life of the people within the military establishment."

The medal is awarded without regard to position or length of service for which the recipient is recognized. Completion of tasks or enterprises are not to be considered, but the conspicuous nature of the achievement is deemed to be itself noteworthy and deserving of recognition.

== Description ==
=== Obverse ===
The medal is of circular design made from bronze with 11 silver tapered sun rays, between the arms of the rays is dark blue. In the center of the rays is a gold star. Superimposed diagonally on the star is a single branch of laurel leaves in light green, with 11 leaves.

=== Reverse ===
The medal is outlined plainly at the reverse. Embossed in arc are the words:

GAWAD SA KAUNLARAN

AWARDED TO

BY THE

CHIEF OF STAFF

AFP

Note that between "AWARDED TO" and "BY THE" is a wide space reserved for the name of the recipient, to be engraved.

=== Symbolism and Significance ===
Sun rays - the conspicuity of the achievement; they also represent the 11 basic needs of man (air, water, food, shelter, clothing, sleep, sanitation, health care, safety, love and belonging, and personal growth), to any of which the achievement service might have been directed

Blue color between the rays - nobility; adds to the conspicuity of the achievement whenever such nobility is made known

Laurel leaves - peaceful nature of the accomplishment of the achievement/service warranting the GSK; the 11 leaves also symbolize the 11 basic human needs as attributed to the sun rays

=== Service Ribbon ===
The medal is suspended from a blue ribbon with a yellow-edged central green stripe.

=== Appurtenances ===
Every subsequent award of the GSK to an individual shall be appurtenant with an Anahaw Leaf, and is awarded as follows:

- Bronze Anahaw Leaf - for the first, second, third, and fourth succeeding award
- Silver Anahaw Leaf - for every fifth succeeding Bronze Anahaw Leaf
- Gold Anahaw Leaf - for every fifth Silver Anahaw Leaf

These devices are to be worn on the GSK's ribbon bar in dress uniforms, with the tips of the leaf pointed upward.

== Notable recipients ==
- Jovito Palparan, retired general, Philippine Army
- Ariston Delos Reyes
- Angelo Reyes
- Jaime Zobel de Ayala
- Mahar Lagmay, Filipino geologist; progenitor of Project NOAH

== See also ==
- Awards and decorations of the Armed Forces of the Philippines
