= Military Civic Action Medal =

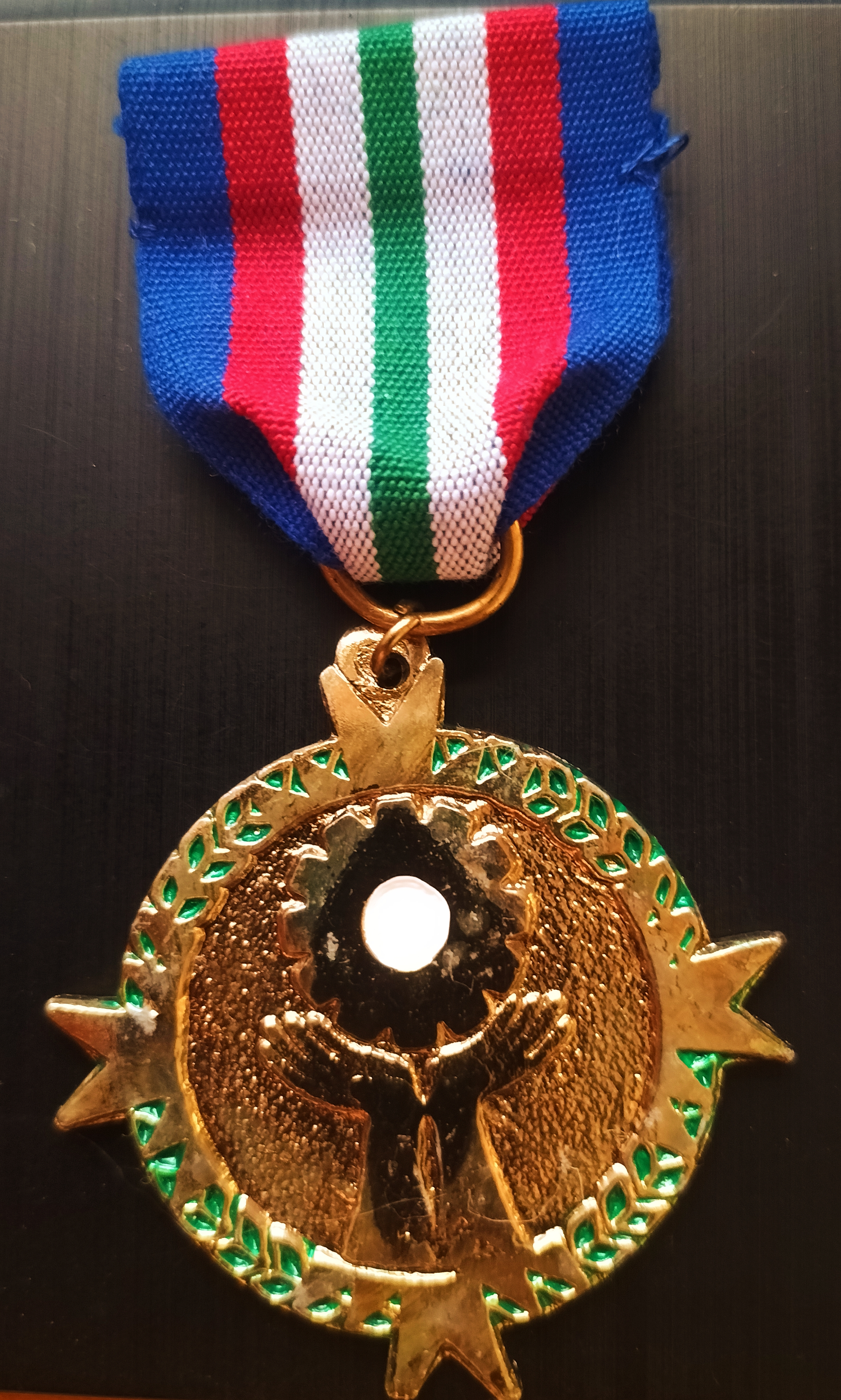
- The Military Civic Action Medal
- Type: Military decoration
- Awarded for: Meritorious achievement in the conduct of humanitarian civic action in direct support military operations
- Country: Philippines
- Presented by: Chief of Staff of the Armed Forces of the Philippines
- Eligibility: Military and civilian personnel of the Armed Forces of the Philippines; Foreign nationals of allied nations
- Status: Currently awarded
- Military Civic Action Medal ribbon bar

Precedence
- Next (higher): Gawad sa Kaunlaran
- Next (lower): Parangal sa Kapanalig ng Sandatahang Lakas ng Pilipinas

The Military Civic Action Medal (MCAM) is a military decoration of the Armed Forces of the Philippines. It is awarded for meritorious achievement in the conduct of humanitarian civic actions in direct support military operations.

== Criteria ==
The Military Civic Action Medal is awarded to both military and civilian personnel of the Armed Forces of the Philippines. It is awarded for "...meritorious achievement in the field of civic action in duty responsibility or in direct support to military operations".

It may also be awarded to foreign nationals from allied nations.

== Description ==
=== Obverse ===
The medal is a golden colored disc, bearing the stylized image of a 12-pitched gear with a small white circular disk. The gear is being held up by a pair of hands, bent 90 degrees. The disc is surrounded by a green wreath encircling the entire obverse. Four golden rays emanate from behind the medal, pointing in the cardinal directions, overlapping the wreath.

The reverse of the MCAM is plain, which is reserve for the name of recipient to be engraved on it.

=== Ribbon Bar ===
The medal is suspended from a blue ribbon, with a central stripe of green, and white, red, and blue on both sides, in that order.

=== Symbolism and Significance (ribbon bar colors) ===
- Blue - lofty ideals of security; Philippine skies
- Red - knowledge and communication
- White - progress; beauty and aspiration
- Green - hope; richness of the nation

=== Appurtenances ===
Every subsequent award of the MCAM to an individual shall be appurtenant with an Anahaw Leaf, and is awarded as follows:

- Bronze Anahaw Leaf - for the first, second, third, and fourth succeeding award
- Silver Anahaw Leaf - for every fifth succeeding Bronze Anahaw Leaf
- Gold Anahaw Leaf - for every fifth Silver Anahaw Leaf

These devices are to be worn on the MCAM's ribbon bar in dress uniforms, with the tips of the leaf pointed upward.

== See also ==
- Awards and decorations of the Armed Forces of the Philippines
