= Outstanding Achievement Medal =

- Outstanding Achievement Medal (and ribbon)
- Type: Single grade neck order
- Awarded for: "...distinguished or extraordinary achievement or service in the advancement of science or in socio-economic, technical or military fields related to national defense, or for public service of the highest order."
- Country: Philippines
- Presented by: the Secretary of National Defense
- Eligibility: Personnel of the Armed Forces of the Philippines; Philippine civilians; citizens of allied nations
- Status: Currently Awarded
- Service Ribbon

Precedence
- Next (higher): Medal of Valor (military); Philippine Legion of Honor (military/civilian)
- Next (lower): Distinguished Conduct Star

The Outstanding Achievement Medal (OAM) is a single grade decoration of the Philippines awarded by the Secretary of National Defense for extraordinary achievements and service for the advancement of national defense.

== Requirements ==
The medal is presented "...for distinguished or extraordinary achievement or service in the advancement of science or in socio-economic, technical or military fields related to national defense, or for public service of the highest order."

In the context of the award, the achievement/serve being commended warranting the conferment of the OAM "must have a long-term effect (i.e. legacy potential) and affects the department or other agencies (i.e. inter-agency)".

The medal is awarded by the Secretary of National Defense to personnel of the Armed Forces of the Philippines as well as Philippine civilians. Civilians of allied foreign countries may also be awarded the medal.

== Description ==
=== Obverse ===
The OAM is a gold-plated five-pointed star surrounded by a gold laurel wreath with 12 pairs of leaves in both tendrils.

The OAM is conferred to the recipient as a neck medal, akin to other major decorations such as the Medal of Valor.

=== Reverse ===
At the back of the star, the following is written:

OUTSTANDING ACHIEVEMENT

MEDAL
AWARDED BY
SECRETARY OF

NATIONAL DEFENSE

=== Service Ribbon ===
The medal is suspended from a purple ribbon with a central gold stripe.

=== Appurtenances ===
Every subsequent award of the OAM to an individual shall be appurtenant with an Anahaw Leaf, and is awarded as follows:

- Bronze Anahaw Leaf - for the first, second, third, and fourth succeeding award
- Silver Anahaw Leaf - for every fifth succeeding Bronze Anahaw Leaf
- Gold Anahaw Leaf - for every fifth Silver Anahaw Leaf

These devices are to be worn on the OAM's ribbon bar in dress uniforms, with the tips of the leaf pointed upward.

== See also ==
- Awards and decorations of the Armed Forces of the Philippines
