= Military Commendation Medal (Philippines) =

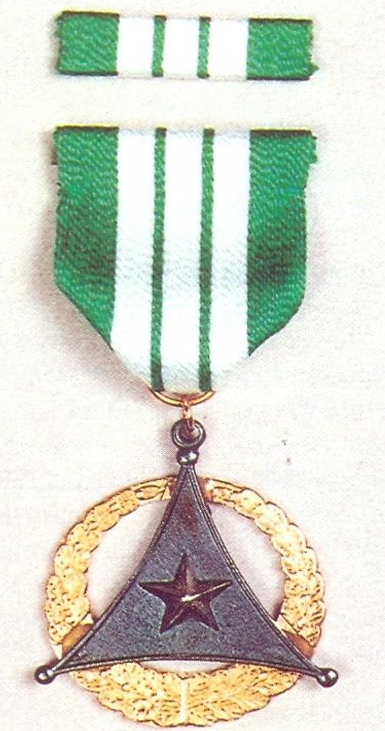
- Military Commendation Medal
- Type: Military decoration
- Awarded for: Exemplary efficiency, devotion, and loyalty to duty assignments
- Country: Philippines
- Presented by: the Armed Forces of the Philippines
- Eligibility: Military personnel of the Armed Forces of the Philippines
- Status: Currently Awarded
- Service Ribbon

Precedence
- Next (higher): Military Merit Medal
- Next (lower): Armed Forces Conduct Medal

The Military Commendation Medal is a military decoration presented to members of the Armed Forces of the Philippines. It is presented for exemplary execution of military duty.

== Requirements ==
For a military service personnel member to be eligible for the MCM, they must have:

1. demonstrated exemplary efficiency, devotion, and loyalty to duty assignments, and/or
2. five (5) Letters of Commendation of different accomplishment, and within the command line (convertible to one MCM)

== Description ==
=== Obverse ===
The MCM is composed of an anodized silver three-pointed triangle (i.e. star), resting on a golden Sampaguita wreath with 46 leaves, and 20 gold buds. The triangle is equilateral, and concave at all sides with an embossed border, and has a small silver star in the middle. Small circles form the tip of every point of the triangle.

=== Reverse ===
At the back of the triangle, the words "LOYALTY", "EFFICIENCY", and "DUTY" are embossed.

=== Symbolism and Significance ===
- Triangle - the single notable achievement in line of duty
- Circles on each tip of the Triangle - the three major island groups of the Philippines
- Sampaguita wreath - high appraisal of such a good deed warranting the MCM

=== Service Ribbon ===
The medal is suspended from a green ribbon with three wide white central stripes.

=== Appurtenances ===
Every subsequent award of the MCM to an individual shall be appurtenant with an Equilateral Triangle Device, awarded as follows:

- Bronze Equilateral Triangle - for the first, second, third, and fourth succeeding award
- Silver Equilateral Triangle - for every fifth succeeding Bronze Equilateral Triangle
- Gold Equilateral Triangle - for every fifth Silver Equilateral Triangle

This device is to be worn on the MCM's ribbon bar in dress uniforms, with the vertex angle/side is pointed upward.

== See also ==
- Awards and decorations of the Armed Forces of the Philippines
