= Donald Gumiran =

Commanding General of the Philippine Army

- Born: Donald Mallanao Gumiran; May 27, 1970 (age 56); Casibarag Sur, Cabagan, Isabela, Philippines
- Education: Philippine Military Academy (BS); Development Academy of the Philippines (MPM); United States Army War College (MSS)
- Spouse: Maria Solita Salonga-Gumiran
- Children: 3
- Military career
- Allegiance: Philippines
- Branch: Philippine Army
- Service years: 1992 - present
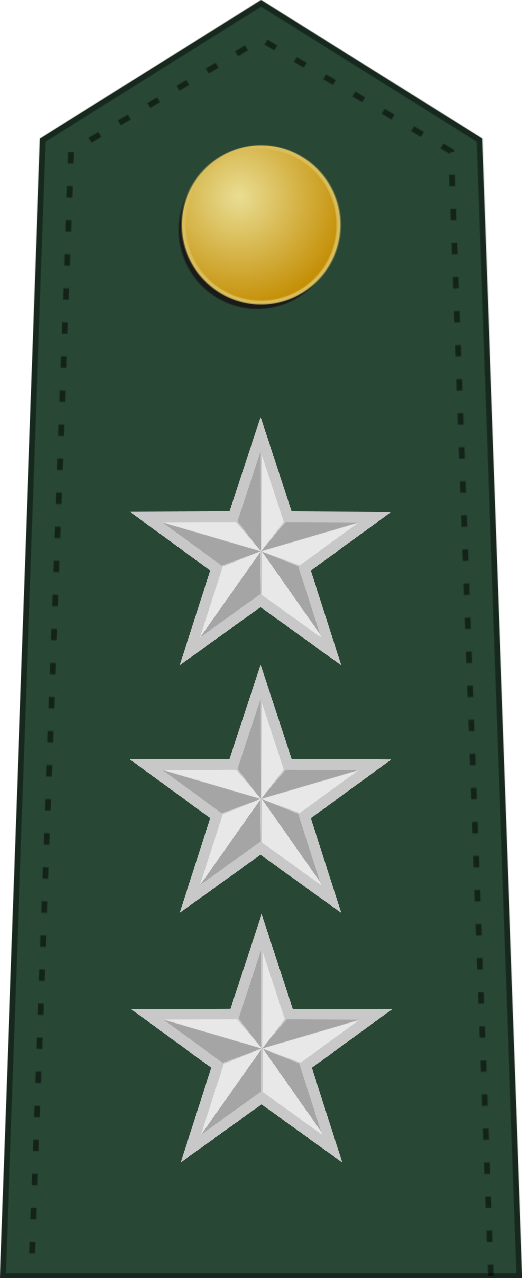
- Rank: Lieutenant General
- Service number: O-10980
- Commands: Commanding General of the Philippine Army; Western Mindanao Command; 6th Infantry Division; 602nd Infantry Brigade; 38th Infantry Battalion; 7th Infantry Battalion
- Conflicts: Communist armed conflicts in the Philippines; Moro conflict UNGCI

Donald Mallanao Gumiran (born 27 May 1970) is a Philippine Army officer who currently serves as the 68th and incumbent Commanding General of the Philippine Army since 21 July 2026, replacing General Antonio Nafarrete, who was promoted as the Chief of Staff of the Armed Forces of the Philippines. Gumiran formerly served as the commander of the Western Mindanao Command, the 6th Infantry Division, and the 602nd Infantry Brigade.

Born and raised in Barangay Casibarag Sur, Cabagan, Isabela with roots of the Ibanag heritage, Gumiran entered the Philippine Military Academy (PMA) in 1988 and is a member of the PMA "Tanglaw-Diwa" Class of 1992, and worked in infantry and operational assignments. Gumiran was also sent to Iraq under the United Nations Guards Contingent in Iraq (UNGCI) and later held staff positions in the AFP Western Command and the Civil-Military Operations Regiment.

== Early life and education ==
Gumiran was born and raised on 27 May 1970 at Barangay Casibarag Sur, Cabagan, Isabela, and his family has roots from the Ibanag heritage. He later entered the Philippine Military Academy (PMA) in 1988 and graduated as a member of the PMA "Tanglaw-Diwa" Class of 1992. Gumiran also attended various local and overseas courses such as the Scout Ranger Course, Basic Airborne Course, Special Operations Training Course, Basic and Advanced Infantry Officer Courses, and the Command and General Staff Course at the Armed Forces of the Philippines Command and General Staff College. Gumiran also earned a Master's Degree in Public Management (MPM), Major in Development and Security at the Development Academy of the Philippines, and a Masters of Strategic Studies (MSS) at the United States Army War College at the Carlisle Barracks, Pennsylvania.

== Military career ==
Gumiran was commissioned as a second lieutenant in 1992 and began his military career as a platoon leader and eventually as a company commander under the 70th Infantry Battalion of the 7th Infantry Division. Gumiran later served into various staff positions under the 7th Infantry Division, before he was eventually deployed to Iraq as he named as the commanding officer of the Special Operations Company of the Philippine Contingent of the United Nations Guards Contingent in Iraq (UNGCI) from 2003 to 2004. In 2004 to 2006, Gumiran was transferred into various staff positions under the AFP Western Command before being moved into the Civil-Military Operations Regiment.

In 2012, Gumiran was named as the executive officer of the 7th Infantry Battalion of the 6th Infantry Division, and was later named as the battalion commander of the same unit from January 2013 to August 2014. Gumiran later became the battalion commander of the 38th Infantry Battalion of the 6th Infantry Division from August 2014 to September 2016, before being named as the commandant of the 6th Infantry Division Training School from September 2016 to April 2018. He later served as the deputy commander of the 602nd Infantry Brigade in 2018 to 2023 before being promoted as the brigade commander of the same unit, the 602nd Infantry Brigade in 2023. During his stint as brigade commander of the 602nd Infantry Brigade, he initiated various campaigns against lawless elements, the Bangsamoro Islamic Freedom Fighters, and the Dawlah Islamiyah (DI) terrorist group. Gumiran also two subsequent operations in coordination with the Moro Islamic Liberation Front, and managed to foil a bombing plot against civilian areas in Maguindanao Del Sur, which also lead to the deaths of several DI terrorists. Gumiran also led law enforcement operations within Maguindanao Del Sur and Cotabato, while also boosting cooperation and collaboration networks between the Philippine Army and the Bangsamoro Region officials and religious leaders. On April 2023, Gumiran also helped initiate negotiations between warring Moro families at Pagalungan, Maguindanao del Sur.

On 25 January 2025, Gumiran was named as the commander of 6th Infantry Division and subsequently served as commander of Joint Task Force Central, and replaced then-Major General Antonio Nafarrete, who named as the commander of the Western Mindanao Command. During his stint as division commander, he continued military operations against terrorist organizations while combatting campaigns against loose firearms in North Cotabato and continued previous peace efforts with local Bangsamoro groups. Gumiran eventually presented 1,177 firearms to President Bongbong Marcos, attributing both military initiatives towards peace efforts and cooperation with local executives.

On October 21, 2025, Gumiran was named as the 21st commander of the AFP Western Mindanao Command, replacing acting commander Brig. Gen. Romulo Quemado, who temporarily assumed the post following then-Lieutenant General Antonio Nafarrete's assumption as the Commanding General of the Philippine Army. During his stint, Gumiran continued his thrust in intensifying combat operations against terrorist groups, and emphasizing proactive cooperation with both Bangsamoro groups and civil-society organizations towards peace development initiatives.

=== Commanding General of the Philippine Army ===
Gumiran was named as the Commanding General of the Philippine Army on 21 July 2026, before fully assuming the position on 11 August 2026, formally replacing then-Lieutenant General Antonio Nafarrete, who was picked as the Chief of Staff of the Armed Forces of the Philippines. During his assumption speech, Gumiran vowed to transform the Army into a "future-ready force", and also introduced his leadership thrust called the STRONG framework, and stand for the following pillars: S for stewardship and leadership; T for transformation and modernization of personnel, capabilities, doctrines, and systems; R for readiness to be a mission-ready, joint-ready, and future-ready force; O for organizational development and stronger institutions; N for nation-building towards national peace, security, and development; and G for God-fearing and anchoring faith and commitment to God, constitution, and the Filipino people. Gumiran also aims to fully defeat localized internal threats and increase preparedness for external threats in a "more demanding security environment", while supporting democratic institutions and strengthen the Army's partnerships with the people at large. Gumiran also made the 2026 Bangsamoro Parliament election an "immediate priority" to help secure the local polls.

== Awards in military service ==
=== Personal military decorations ===
- Distinguished Service Star with four bronze anahaw leaves
- Meritorious Achievement Medal
- Distinguished Service Medal with one bronze anahaw leaf
- Chief of Staff, AFP Commendation Medal
- Gawad sa Kaunlaran Medal with one bronze anahaw leaf
- Bronze Cross Medal
- Silver Wing Medal
- Military Merit Medal with one bronze spearhead devices
- Military Merit Medal with four silver anahaw leaves
- Military Merit Medal with three bronze anahaw leaves
- Military Civic Action Medal with one silver anahaw leaf and three bronze anahaw leaves
- 2 Parangal sa Kapanalig ng Sandatahang Lakas ng Pilipinas Medals
- Military Commendation Medal with three silver equilateral triangles
- Military Commendation Medal with three bronze equilateral triangles

=== Campaign and service medals ===
- United Nations Service Medal
- United Nations UNGCI Medal
- Long Service Medal
- Anti-Dissidence Campaign Medal
- Luzon Anti-Dissidence Campaign Medal
- Visayas Anti-Dissidence Campaign Medal
- Mindanao Anti-Dissidence Campaign Medal
- Disaster Relief & Rehabilitation Operation Ribbon with one bronze service star

=== Unit Decorations ===
- Philippine Republic Presidential Unit Citation
- People Power II Unit Citation
- Martial Law Unit Citation

=== Badges ===
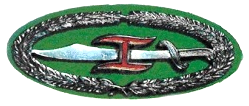
- Combat Commander's Kagitingan Badge
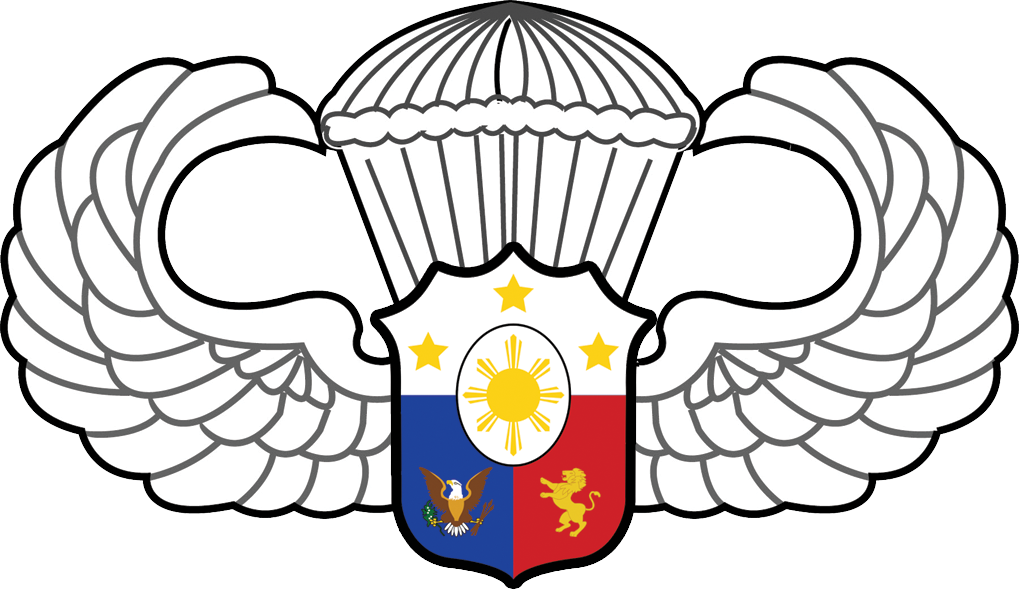
- AFP Basic Parachutist Badge
- Scout Ranger Qualification Badge
- United States Army War College Badge

== Personal life ==
Gumiran is married to Maria Solita Salonga-Gumiran and they have three children.
