= Emmanuel Bautista =

Filipino general

Emmanuel Bautista PLH
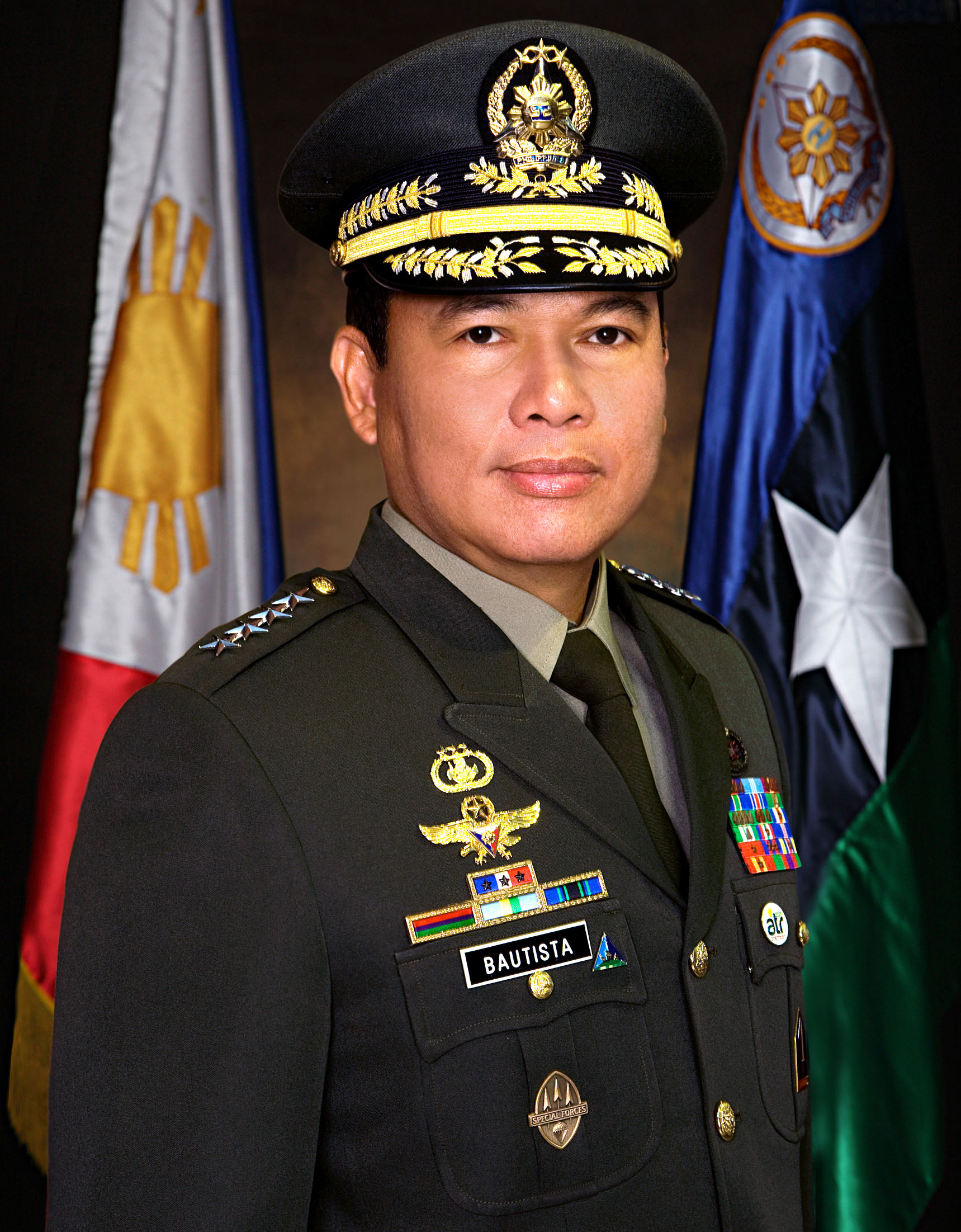
- Born: Emmanuel T. Bautista; 20 July 1958 (age 68); Quezon City, Philippines
- Military career
- Allegiance: Philippines
- Branch: Philippine Army
- Service years: 1981–2014
- Rank: General
- Units: Chief of Staff, AFP; Commanding General, PA; 3rd ID, PA; Deputy Chief of Staff for Operations, Organization & Training, J3; AFP Internal Auditor; 702IBDE, 7ID, PA; Senior Military Assistant, DND; Chief of Staff, SOCOM, PA; 24IB, 7ID, PA
- Conflicts: Islamic insurgency in the Philippines; Zamboanga City crisis; New People's Army rebellion
- Awards: Distinguished Service Star; Gold Cross Medal; OAM; Bronze Cross Medal; Military Merit Medal; Legion of Honor

Emmanuel Trinidad Bautista (born July 20, 1958) is a Filipino general who served as the 44th Chief of Staff of the Armed Forces of the Philippines as he succeeded Gen. Jessie Dellosa as AFP Chief. He served as the Executive Director of the Cabinet Cluster on Security, Justice, and Peace at the Office of the President, Malacañang. His appointment as Undersecretary at the Office of the President was from 1 September 2014 to 22 June 2020 shortly after retirement from the military service as Chief of Staff, Armed Forces of the Philippines. Concurrently, he headed the National Task Force on the Whole of Nation Initiative and was also the executive Director of the National Task Force on the West Philippine Sea. He was succeeded by Gregorio Pio Catapang as AFP chief.

== Early years and education ==
Bautista was born in Quezon City on 20 July 1958. Following the footsteps of his father, the late BGen Teodulfo Bautista, he entered the Philippine Military Academy in 1976. He graduated 7th out of the 161 cadets belonging to the PMA Class of 1981, and was the recipient of the JUSMAG Saber award; the Commanding General, Philippine Army award; and the Distinguished Cadet Award.

Upon his graduation from the PMA, General Bautista attended further military schooling, which included the Scout Ranger, Infantry Officer Advance, and Command and General Staff courses. He also went to various military trainings abroad, namely Grade II Staff & Tactics Course in New Zealand, Joint & Combined Warfighting at the Joint Forces Staff College, National Defense University in the United States of America, Security Sector Reform at the Asia-Pacific Center for Security Studies, Hawaii USA, Symposium on East Asia Security by the US State Department and United States Pacific Command, and Senior Executive Seminar at the George C. Marshall European Center for Security Studies, Germany, and European Common Security and Defense Policy Orientation Seminar at the European Security and Defense College. He also holds a Master of Business Administration degree from the University of the Philippines, Diliman.

== Military career ==
=== Patikul Massacre while at the Philippine Military Academy ===
When Bautista was enrolled in PMA and residing in his family home in Marikina, Brig. Gen. Teodulfo Bautista, his father, and 34 of his men expected a favorable result to their peace talks with the rebels. Instead, they received gunshots and hack wounds leading to their untimely demise.

Brig. Gen. Bautista, then the Commanding General of the 1st Infantry "Tabak" Division (1ID), was set to meet with rebel leader Usman Sali and his men to discuss the peaceful coexistence of the opposing parties in the region. He even invited the then Armed Forces of the Philippines (AFP) Vice Chief of Staff Lt. Gen. Fidel V. Ramos, and the then AFP Adjutant General Col. Gabriel Pangilinan to participate in the meeting but they refused due to their prior appointments.

At the last minute, Sali proposed to the general that they meet at a public market in Patikul instead of the 18th Infantry Battalion's Headquarters. The general accepted and set off without any doubt to Sali's intentions.

Brig. Gen. Bautista and his men aboard two military trucks went to the meeting place unarmed as a sign of goodwill but found no one in sight. They decided to sit in the nearby table and wait for Sali, only to be attacked the moment their guard was down. The troops were mercilessly shot and hacked. Only Sgt. Oliver Calzada survived the attack by playing dead while his comrades were being killed right before his eyes. After the treacherous attack, Sali fled to Malaysia but some reports indicate that Usman Sali died during subsequent government operations.

The military was devastated upon hearing the outcome of what was supposed to be a peaceful meeting between the opposing sides. Brig. Gen. Bautista's son, Emmanuel T. Bautista, was then a young plebe at the Philippine Military Academy when the news reached him.

Despite grieving the loss of his father, the young Bautista pushed himself to excel in his training. He placed seventh among the 161 graduates of Class 1981 and went on to hold various leadership positions in the Philippine Army.

=== Philippine Army ===
Bautista was assigned as a platoon leader of the 26th Infantry Battalion in Mindanao; Company commander of the 7th Scout Ranger Company; Battalion commander of the 24th Infantry Battalion; the Brigade commander of the 702nd Infantry Brigade in Central Luzon; and as the Commanding general of the 3rd Infantry Division in Western Visayas.

He held several staff positions in both the Philippine Army and the General Headquarters, AFP. He assumed the positions of Chief of Staff of the 7th Infantry Division, PA; Chief of Staff of the Special Operations Command, PA; Secretary Army General Staff; and Assistant Chief of Staff for Operations, G3, PA. He also served as Senior Military Adviser to the Secretary of National Defense; Assistant Deputy Chief of Staff for Plans, J5, AFP; and The Internal Auditor, AFP.

In 2010, Bautista served as the Deputy Chief of Staff for Operations, J3, AFP. As the J3, he led the crafting of the AFP Internal Peace and Security Plan (IPSP) "Bayanihan". IPSP "Bayanihan" introduced a paradigm shift in the AFP from "defeating the enemy" to "winning the peace" with utmost emphasis on respect for human rights, international humanitarian law, rule of law, and multi-stakeholder engagement.

On 9 November 2011, Bautista assumed command of the 85,000-strong Philippine Army during a critical period in the organization's reform. Under his leadership, the Philippine Army furthered its pursuit of the Army Transformation Roadmap (ATR). The ATR is a transformation program founded on good governance and performance excellence. During his command, the Philippine Army stabilized its transformation, raised levels of troop discipline and professionalism, developed capabilities and enhanced training, and focused on stakeholder engagements and peace building efforts.

=== AFP Chief of Staff ===
Gen. Bautista along with Gen. Martin Dempsey at a welcoming ceremony at The Pentagon.

On 17 January 2013, Bautista was appointed by President Benigno Aquino III as the 44th Chief of Staff of the Armed Forces of the Philippines. His leadership of the AFP was anchored on the fulfillment of its constitutional mandate through the Internal Peace and Security Plan "Bayanihan" and its pursuit of Security Sector Reform initiatives through the Armed Forces of the Philippines Transformation Roadmap.

In February 2014, Bautista garnering praise from Filipino netizens for sending a helicopter to the aid of victims of a bus crash in Mountain Province upon the request of RockEd Philippines founder Gang Badoy, who unknowingly named the AFP Chief of Staff "Manny Sundalo" in her cellphone's directory.

He retired from military service on July 18, 2014.

== Awards and achievements ==
Bautista is a recipient of several military and civilian distinctions, seven of which are combat decorations. His military awards include seven Distinguished Service Stars, a Gold Cross for gallantry in action, a Bronze Cross Medal for bravery, a Philippine Legion of Honor with the degree of an Officer, a Philippine Legion of Honor with the degree of Commander as the Commanding General, Philippine Army, and a Philippine Legion of Honor with the degree of Chief Commander as Chief of Staff, Armed Forces of the Philippines. He also received four Outstanding Achievement Medals, 29 Military Merit Medals, several Military Commendation Medals and various military campaign medals and ribbons. In 2014, Bautista was also conferred the Honorary Malaysian Armed Forces Order for Valour, Warrior of the Malaysian Armed Forces for his contributions in strengthening bilateral ties and fostering mutual cooperation between the Malaysian Armed Forces and the Armed Forces of the Philippines. He was also awarded the Bintang Yudha Dharma Utama "The Grand Meritorious Military Order – 1st Class" by the Republic of Indonesia, the highest award given to those serving in foreign armed services.

Bautista also earned a number of recognitions from local government officials during his various tours of duty and from national civilian agencies with which the units he commanded worked together in pursuit of peace and national development goals. He received an outstanding alumni award from the Philippine Military Academy as well as from the University of the Philippines College of Business Administration. He was also conferred with the Asia-Pacific Center for Security Studies Alumnus of the Year for 2013 for his contribution to reform the security sector of the Philippines. In 2014, he was awarded the University of the Philippines Distinguished Alumni Award for Peace and Social Cohesion. He was also awarded the CEO Excel Award for top business and organizational leaders by the International Association of Business Communicators (IABC) Philippines.

- Philippine Republic Presidential Unit Citation
- Martial Law Unit Citation
- People Power I Unit Citation
- People Power II Unit Citation
- Distinguished Service Star
- Gold Cross Medal
- Philippine Legion of Honor -Degree of Chief Commander
- Military Merit Medal (Philippines)
- Military Commendation Medal
- Silver Wing Medal
- Bronze Cross Medal
- Outstanding Achievement Medals
- Malaysian Armed Forces Order of Valor, First Commander
- Bintang Yudha Dharma Utama
- Disaster Relief & Rehabilitation Operation Ribbon
- Anti-Dissidence Campaign Medal
- Luzon Anti Dissidence Campaign Medal
- Visayas Anti-Dissidence Campaign Medal
- Mindanao Anti-dissidence Campaign Medal
- Long Service Medal
- Scout Ranger Qualification Badge
- Special Forces Qualification Badge

== Personal life ==
Bautista is married to Bernardita Pardo Bautista; they have a son, Paolo.
