= Tirso G. Fajardo =

Filipino Army General (1910–1986)

Tirso Fajardo
- Tirso Fajardo y Delos Trino

Commanding General of the Philippine Army
- In office June 12, 1958 – August 1, 1959
- President: Carlos P. Garcia
- Preceded by: Leoncio S. Tan
- Succeeded by: Alfredo M. Santos

Commanding General 1st Infantry Division
- In office 1956–1958
- President: Carlos P. Garcia; Ramon Magsaysay
- Preceded by: Leoncio S. Tan

Superintendent Philippine Military Academy
- In office 1947–1949
- President: Elpidio Quirino; Manuel A. Roxas
- Preceded by: Ramon Enriquez
- Succeeded by: Lt. Col. Patricio Borromeo

Personal details
- Born: Tirso Gimenez Fajardo; September 24, 1910 Las Piñas, Manila, Philippine Islands
- Died: May 6, 1986 (aged 75)
- Resting place: Libingan ng mga Bayani, Fort Bonifacio, Taguig
- Spouse: Lilian Elizabeth "Diane" deVault (1914 - 1996)
- Education: Masters in Mechanical Engineering; Bachelor of Science Degree
- Alma mater: Command and General Staff College, Fort Leavenworth; Massachusetts Institute of Technology; United States Military Academy(1934); Philippine Constabulary Academy
- Profession: Mechanical Engineer
- Awards: Allied Hall of Fame, US Army Command and General Staff College

Military service
- Allegiance: Philippines
- Branch/service: Philippine Army
- Years of service: 1934 - 1960
- Rank: Brigadier General
- Unit: 1st Infantry Division IV Military Area; Philippine Military Academy; 1st Filipino Infantry Regiment 1st Filipino Battalion
- Commands: Philippine Army; I1st Infantry Division; V Military Area; Philippine Military Academy

Tirso Gimenez Fajardo (September 24, 1910 - May 6, 1986) was a Filipino Army General who served as 2nd Commanding General of the Philippine Army.

== Early life and education ==
Fajardo was born as Tirso Gimenez Fajardo y Delos Trino on September 24, 1910, in Las Piñas, Manila Province, Philippines. His father, Daniel Fajardo, was a music teacher and prominent part of the town's band. He became a Master Sergeant on Philippine Constabulary's Band. He is known as father of music in Las Piñas. Tirso had two brothers: Esteban, who became a lieutenant colonel; and, Apolinario who became a colonel in the Army. Both were World War II veterans, having fought in Bataan and survived the death march.

=== Military Service ===
Tirso Fajardo attended United States Military Academy in WestPoint, New York and graduated in 1934. He returned to the Philippines and was commissioned as 2nd Lieutenant in Philippine Scouts. He was posted in 1935 as instructor and help transition the Philippine Constabulary Academy to Philippine Military Academy. He was sent to United States in 1940 to further his military expertise.

=== World War II ===
He was stranded in US when World War II started in December 1941 and he was sent Command and General Staff College in Fort Leavenworth, Kansas. After graduating he joined the new 1st Filipino Infantry Battalion in Camp San Luis Obispo, California. He was made Operations and Training Officer S3 of the unit and promoted to captain. Around this time the unit expanded and 1st Filipino Infantry Regiment was activated and he was retained as regimental S3 promoted to Major. He landed in Palo, Leyte in 1944 together with the 6th US Army and General Douglas MacArthur and found himself commanding a battalion and later became executive officer of the regiment, this time under 8th US Army.

=== Post War ===
In 1947 he was appointed as Superintendent of Philippine Military Academy and was promoted to lieutenant colonel, the youngest to hold the position until today. The first class post war came in 1947 and among its graduates is Cadet Fortunate Abat who would be future Commanding General of Philippine Army and Secretary of National Defense under Ramos Administration. He applied for early retirement with US Army in 1949 and transferred to the Philippine Army.

=== Philippine Army ===
After transferring to the Philippine Army, he continued his post at Philippine Military Academy. In 1951 he was appointed as commander of IV Military Area in Northern Mindanao and was promoted to colonel. He was appointed as commander of 1st Infantry Division and commanded it from October 1, 1957, to June 15, 1958.

He was made Commanding General Philippine Army in 1958. He served until 1960 and upon completing 30 years after he joined military service he retired.

== Personal life ==
He died on May 6, 1986, at the age of 75 and buried at the Libingan ng mga Bayani in Fort Bonifacio, Taguig, Metro Manila.

== See also ==
- Commanding General Philippine Army
- Philippine Scouts
- Philippine Military Academy
