= Roy Galido =

Philippine Army officer

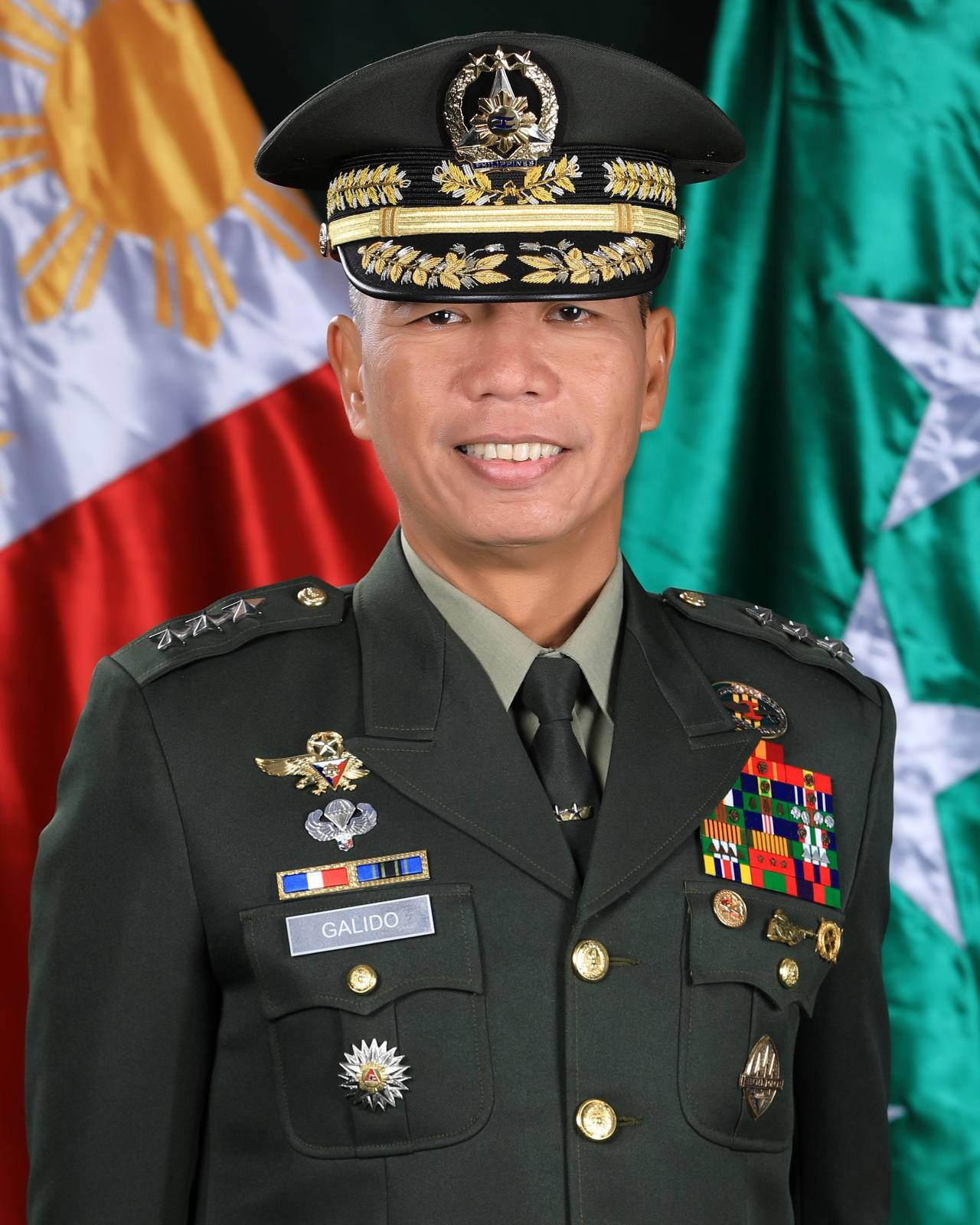
- Born: Roy Mabagos Galido; July 25, 1968 (age 58)
- Education: Philippine Military Academy (BS); Philippine Christian University (MiM); University of New South Wales (MSIT); Development Academy of the Philippines (MPM); San Beda College Alabang (Benedictine Abbey School)
- Spouse: Rina Galido
- Children: 2
- Military career
- Allegiance: Philippines
- Branch: Philippine Army
- Service years: 1990–2025
- Rank: Lieutenant General
- Service number: O-10285
- Commands: Commanding General of the Philippine Army; Western Mindanao Command; 6th Infantry Division; Joint Task Force Central; 601st Infantry Brigade; The Inspector General, Philippine Army; Joint Task Force Tugis; 40th Infantry Battalion; 38th Infantry Battalion; Task Group Bigkis-Lahi
- Conflicts: Communist armed conflicts in the Philippines; Moro conflict

Roy Mabagos Galido is a Philippine Army officer who served as the 66th Commanding General of the Philippine Army (CGPA) and held the position from 7 August 2023 to 31 July 2025. Prior to his appointment as the CGPA, Galido's previous commands include the Western Mindanao Command, the 6th Infantry (Kampilan) Division and the 601st Infantry (Unifier) Brigade.

== Early life and education ==
Galido was born to a military family. His father, retired Brigadier General Alejandro Alonsagay Galido, was born in Sebaste, Antique on 12 July 1936 and was a graduate of the Philippine Military Academy (PMA) class of 1958. Alejandro was later involved in the December 1989 coup against President Corazon Aquino for his involvement in intelligence operations in the coup attempts reportedly acting as a deep penetration agent for General Renato S. de Villa, Chief of Staff Armed Forces of the Philippines and compulsorily retiring afterwards as the Commanding General of the AFP Southern Luzon Command (SOLCOM) after 36 years of military service in 1990.

Galido first entered the University of the Philippines for one year and later entered the PMA with the influence of his father in 1986, and graduated as part of the "Bigkis Lahi" Class of 1990. Galido later completed various courses locally and abroad, such as the Infantry Officer Basic Course, where he completed 3rd of his class; the AFP Command & General Staff Course, the Scout Ranger Qualification Course, the Basic Airborne Course, the Terrorism/Counterterrorism Course, the VIP Course, the Case Officer Course, the Site Exploitation Course, and the Special Forces Combat Qualification Course, where he completed 2nd of his class. Galido also completed the Infantry Officer Advance Course, the Intelligence Officer Course, and the Military Intelligence Collection Course, where he completed all of the courses 1st of his class. Galido also completed the Senior Executive Course on National Security with distinction at the National Defense College of the Philippines (NDCP). Galido also attended the Defense Research Analysis Course and Intermediate Intelligence Officers Course in Brisbane, Australia; the Tactical Commanders Course with the US Counter Terrorism Training Group, an Executive Seminar on Internal Affairs at the US Defense Institute of International Legal Studies; a Technical Operations Course in New Zealand; and an Executive Program in Defense Decision Making in California, USA.

Galido is also known to be an accomplished scholar and also holds a Master's Degree in Management at the Philippine Christian University; a Master of Science in Information Technology at the University of New South Wales in Sydney, Australia; and a Masters in Public Management, majoring in Development Security at the Development Academy of the Philippines.

== Military career ==
After his graduation in the PMA in 1990, Galido got his first deployment as a second lieutenant in Laguna where he served as a Platoon Commander under the 63rd Infantry (Innovator) Battalion of the 2nd Infantry (Jungle Fighter) Division and later as Company Commander under the 1st Infantry (Always First) Battalion of the 2nd Infantry (Jungle Fighter) Division, before being named as commander of various units in Mindanao under the 6th Infantry (Kampilan) Division. Galido also served as the chief of the AFP Systems Engineering Office, commander of the Joint Task Group Tugis, and was later named as commander of Task Group Bigkis-Lahi. Galido was eventually named as the commander of the 38th Infantry Battalion and the 40th Infantry Battalion. Galido eventually served as the commander of the 601st Infantry Brigade, where he spearheaded military operations against the Bangsamoro Islamic Freedom Fighters (BIFF) in South Cotabato, Sultan Kudarat, Maguindanao; and was later named as the acting chief of staff of the Philippine Army. Galido was also designated at the Intelligence Service of the Armed Forces of the Philippines (ISAFP), and also served as the Army Deputy Chief of Staff for Comptrollership (OJ6), before being placed at the AFP Management & Fiscal Office, the Army Resource Management Office, and the Office of the Army Fiscal Management.

Galido was later named as the Army Inspector General before serving simultaneously as the Acting Chief of Staff of the Army and Acting Vice Commander of the Army and would occasionally be the Acting Commanding General of the Philippine Army in the absence of Lt. General Romeo S. Brawner, Jr. On 4 August 2022, Galido was named as the commander of the 6th Infantry (Kampilan) Division, where he replaced Major General Roberto Capulong.

During his stint as division commander of the 6th Infantry (Kampilan) Division, Galido subsequently served as the commander of the Joint Task Force Central, where he initiated operations against communist insurgents within Western Mindanao. On 20 January 2023, Galido was named as the commander of the AFP Western Mindanao Command (WESMINCOM), and replaced Lieutenant General Alfredo Rosario Jr. During his term as WESMINCOM Commander, Galido led operations against the Abu Sayyaf Group (ASG) and other related terrorist networks, as well as the recovery of various improvised explosive devices (IEDs), and enhanced engagements with stakeholders for peace development initiatives. Galido also led the rescue various hostages from the ASG, which included the rescue mission on Ahmad Ibrahim Rullie, the son of the Indonesian couple Rullie Rian Zeke and Ulfa Handayani Saleh, who led the 2019 Jolo Cathedral bombings, and also launched a raid which led to the death of Faharudin Hadji Satar, who is also known as Abu Zacharia, the leader (emir) of the Daulah Islamiyah-Maute Group, in the outskirts if Marawi in June 2023.

=== Commanding General of the Philippine Army ===
On 7 August 2023, Galido was named as the Commanding General of the Philippine Army (CGPA), and replaced General Romeo Brawner Jr., who was named as the AFP Chief of Staff and serves as the first CGPA to serve under a fixed two-year term under the provisions of Republic Act No. 11939. During his assumption speech, Galido created his leadership thrust named "ARMY", which stands for Always pray to seek divine guidance in their daily activities; be Reliable, Responsive, Relevant to address the needs of the nation; be Mission-oriented in utilizing every resource, effort, and sacrifice to boost Morale; and Yield personal interests and comforts for unity, the Army, the Armed Forces of the Philippines, and the nation. Galido also vowed to continue peace initiatives in Mindanao and enhance the Army's modernization programs, as well as to emphasize the need for creating skilled soldiers beyond its usage in warfare to other skills for community development. Galido also initiated a comprehensive command guidance towards the creation of various innovative measures towards both internal and external operations, in line with the AFP's Comprehensive Archipelagic Defense Concept (CADC) to bolster the country's defenses through the army's Land Based Defense Concept initiative.

During his term as the CGPA, Galido also enhanced collaboration with various organizations in the private sector and enhanced the army's recruitment processes and modernize the army's training programs through the army's "One Recruitment Program" and training enhancement programs. Galido also enhanced the army's healthcare systems through the development of modernized army hospitals and increased partnership with private medical institutions and private hospitals to boost the army's medical needs. Galido also initiated base expansion programs aimed to create "self-sustaining" army bases while boosting the army bases' facilities and also includes additional structures for storing weapons, vehicles, and various equipment. Galido also created new units and expanded other army units to boost and enhance the army's capabilities, such as the creation of the Combat Engineers Regiment, as well as the deactivation of selected army and the activation of new combat engineer battalions, and the creation of the 1st Tank (Masikan) Battalion, as well as the enhancement of the army's Chemical, Biological, Radiological, Nuclear and Explosive (CBRNE) units aimed to counter potential biological threats as part of the army's lessons during the COVID-19 pandemic. Galido also led the reactivation of the Special Operations Command, Philippine Army to boost the army's operational control in special operations units. Galido also led the enhancement of the army's intelligence and cybersecurity capabilities aimed at securing the army's cyber domain.

Galido also continued to boost the army's preparations for external operations by launching combined arms exercises aimed at enhancing the army's joint operations and external defense capabilities, while boosting collaboration with allied partners in the Asia-Pacific region for interoperability capabilities and joint missions. As part of his thrust for external defense preparations, Galido launched the army's Land Defense Concept, which serves as part of the AFP's thrusts in external defense operations through the AFP's Comprehensive Archipelagic Defense Concept (CADC) and Tatag Kapuluan campaign plan, and is aimed to prepare the army towards external land defense. Galido also strengthened the army's reserve force which led to the implementation of upgrading the army's Community Defense Centers and Regional Community Defense Groups, which is aimed to streamline the training programs for civilians to become reservists in the army. Galido retired from military service on 31 July 2025 upon reaching the end of his fixed 2-year term, and was later replaced by the commander of the AFP Western Mindanao Command Lieutenant General Antonio Nafarrete.

== Awards in military service ==
- Commander, Philippine Legion of Honor (for his exceptional dedication and service during his term as the CGPA and for his leadership in implementing the Army's modernization programs, strengthening civil-military relations, and enhancing multilateral regional defense cooperation) (awarded on 31 July 2025)
- Outstanding Achievement Medal
- Distinguished Service Star with two silver anahaw leaves
- Meritorious Achievement Medal with one bronze anahaw leaf
- Distinguished Service Medal with one bronze anahaw leaf
- Chief of Staff, AFP Commendation Medal
- Gawad sa Kaunlaran Medal with one silver anahaw leaf
- Bronze Cross Medal with one bronze anahaw leaf
- Silver Wing Medal
- Military Merit Medal with three bronze spearhead devices
- Military Merit Medal with 4 silver anahaw leaves
- Military Merit Medal with two anahaw leaf
- Sagisag ng Ulirang Kawal Medal
- Military Civic Action Medal with one silver and two bronze anahaw leaves
- 2 Parangal sa Kapanalig ng Sandatahang Lakas ng Pilipinas Medals
- Military Commendation Medal with three silver equilateral triangles
- Military Commendation Medal with four bronze equilateral triangles

=== Foreign honors and medals ===
- Commander, Legion of Merit (for his role in enhancing defense ties between the Philippines and the United States and for spearheading the Army Modernization Programs) (awarded on 11 November 2024)
- Japan Ground Self-Defense Force (JGSDF) Defense Cooperation Medal (for his contributions to enhancing the ties between the JGSDF and the Philippine Army, as well as for his proactive participation in high-level multilateral defense dialogues and multilateral collaboration between the CORE Four nations) (awarded on 12 July 2025)
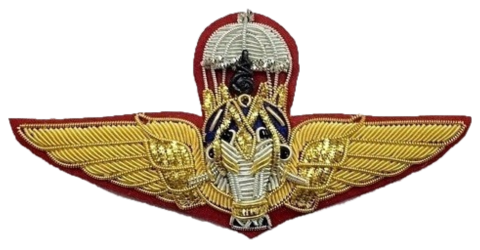
- Honorary Airborne Wings of the Royal Thai Army

=== Campaign and service medals ===
- Long Service Medal with three bronze service stars
- Anti-Dissidence Campaign Medal
- Luzon Anti-Dissidence Campaign Medal
- Mindanao Anti-Dissidence Campaign Medal with one bronze service star
- Northern Maritime Frontier Campaign Medal
- Disaster Relief & Rehabilitation Operation Ribbon with two bronze service stars

=== Unit Decorations ===
- Philippine Republic Presidential Unit Citation
- People Power II Unit Citation

=== Badges ===
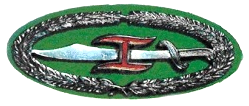
- Combat Commander's Kagitingan Badge
- PAF Gold Wings Badge
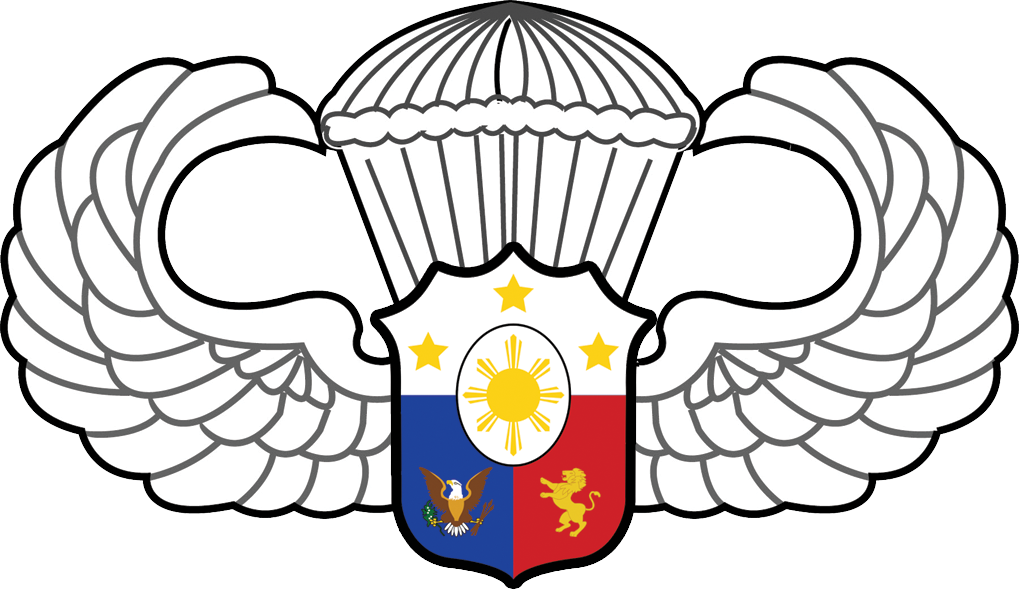
- AFP Parachutist Badge
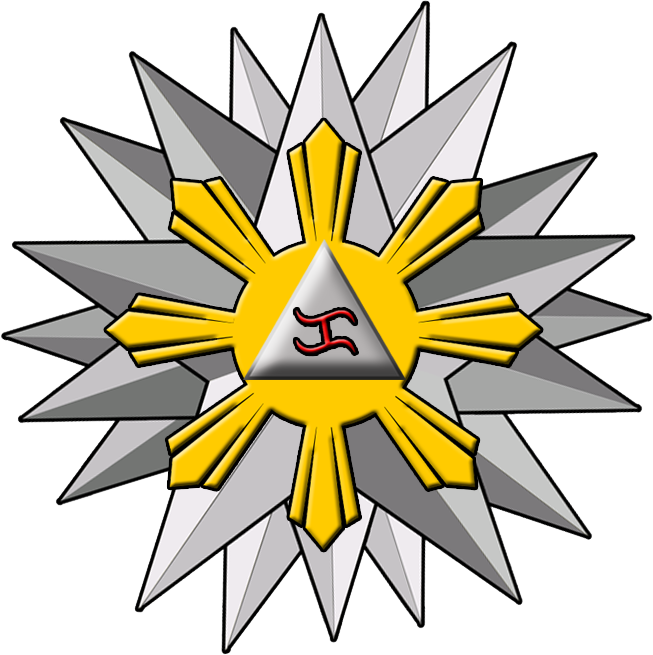
- AFP Command & General Staff Course Badge
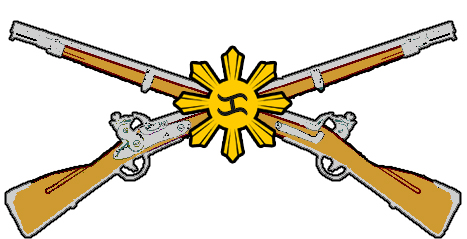
- Philippine Army Infantry Badge
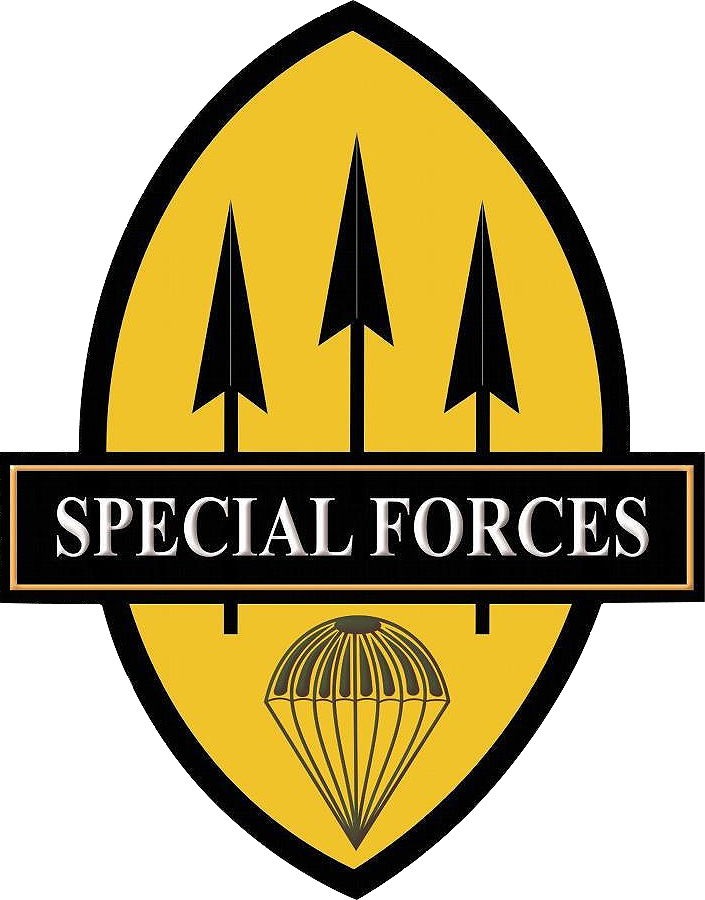
- Special Forces Qualification Badge
- Scout Ranger Qualification Badge (Honorary)
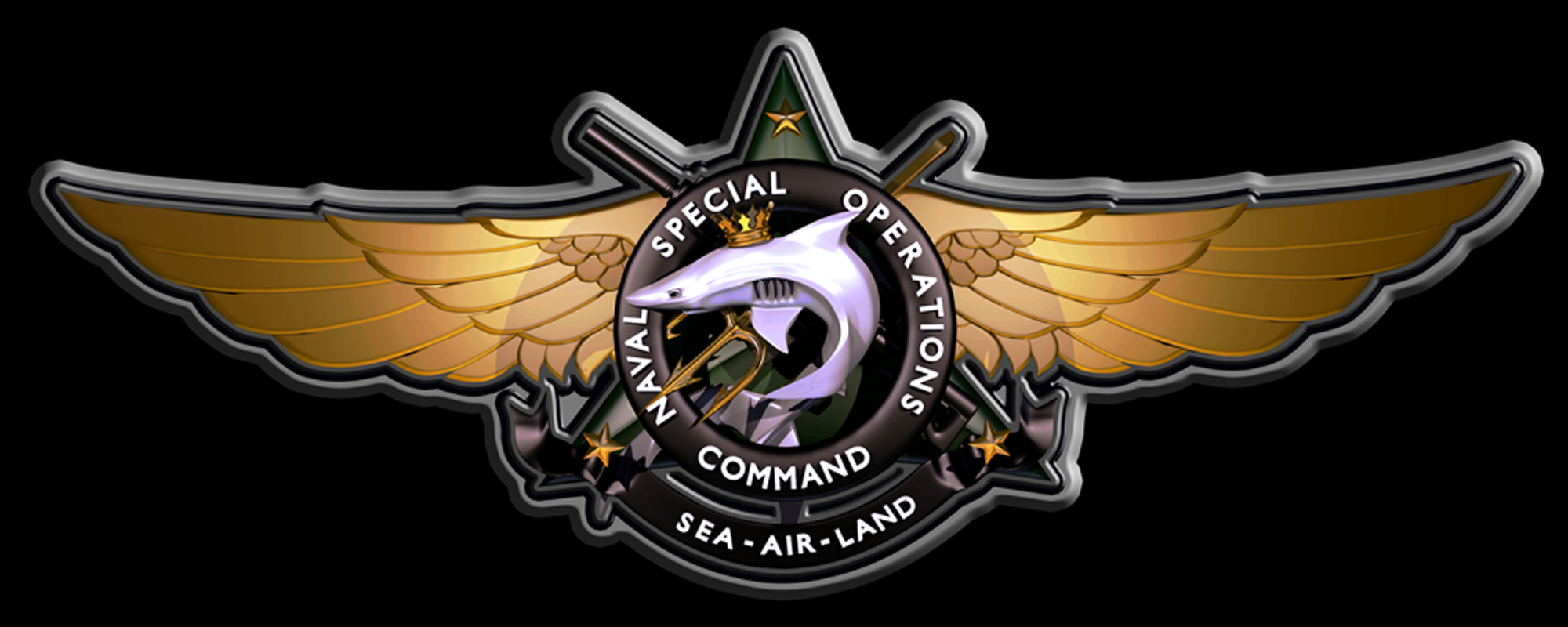
- Philippine Navy’s Naval Special Operations Command (NAVSOCOM) Honorary Badge

=== Other awards ===
- 2024 Asia’s Modern Hero Awards
- 2025 Asia's Champion of Strategic Military Leadership at the Asia's Influential Leader Awards

== Personal life ==
Galido is married to Rina Jose Galido. They both have two sons. Galido is also a known golfer. The Galido family also maintain a residence at Alabang Hills in Muntinlupa City.
