= Jovito Palparan =

Philippine military official and politician

General Jovito Palparan
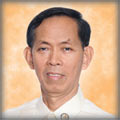
- Born: Jovito Salvaña Palparan Jr. September 11, 1950 (age 76); Cagayan de Oro, Misamis Oriental, Philippines
- Education: University of the East (BBA); Philippine Christian University (MBA); National Defense College of the Philippines (MNSA)
- Known for: Disappearance of Sherlyn Cadapan and Karen Empeño
- Spouse: Ma. Evangelina Gamad Flores Palparan
- Status: Imprisoned
- Convictions: Kidnapping and serious illegal detention
- Penalty: 40 years in prison

Details
- Date: June 26, 2006
- Country: Philippines
- Date apprehended: August 12, 2014
- Imprisoned at: New Bilibid Prison

Member of the House of Representatives for Bantay
- In office April 24, 2009 – June 30, 2010

Personal details
- Party: Independent (2015–present)
- Other political affiliations: Bantay (2007–2010)
- Nickname: The Butcher

Military service
- Allegiance: Republic of the Philippines
- Branch/service: Philippine Army
- Years of service: 1973–2007
- Rank: Major general
- Commands: 7th Infantry Division; 8th Infantry Division
- Battles/wars: New People's Army rebellion Moro conflict Punjab Insurgency; Iraq War; Chittagong Hill Tracts conflict
- Awards: Distinguished Service Star; Gold Cross; Gawad sa Kaunlaran; Bronze Cross; Wounded Personnel Medal; Military Merit Medal

Jovito Salvaña Palparan Jr. (born September 11, 1950) is a retired Army general, former politician, and a convicted criminal. From July 2003 to July 2004, he was the commander of the Philippine Humanitarian Contingent in the Iraq War. He also served as a Congressman representing the Bantay party-list group in the 14th Congress of the Philippines.

He earned the nickname "The Butcher" for his deadly campaign against communist rebels. On September 17, 2018, Palparan was found guilty of kidnapping and serious illegal detention over the enforced disappearance of Sherlyn Cadapan and Karen Empeño in 2006, and was sentenced to 40 years imprisonment.

== Early life ==
Jovito Salvaña Palparan Jr. was born on September 11, 1950, in Cagayan de Oro, Misamis Oriental. He earned a degree in business administration from the University of the East in Manila in 1971. Palparan later earned a master's degree in management from the Philippine Christian University in 1994, and a master's degree in national security administration from the National Defense College of the Philippines in 1999.

== Military career ==
Palparan was called to active duty in the Armed Forces of the Philippines in 1973. As a lieutenant, he served in Basilan and Sulu for eight years. Palparan's first combat duty was in the island of Siasi, Sulu with the 24th Infantry Battalion in January 1974 but his first encounter was in Indanan, Sulu when MNLF fighters attacked the 24th Inf. Bn. after the burning of Jolo, Sulu in February 1974 where he earned his first combat medal. He was almost dismissed from the service when he led 12 soldiers of 24IB known as Wildcats in the rescue of a fellow Wildcat who was attacked by Marine soldiers leading to one of the biggest mis-encounters among AFP units that took place in the Pier of Zamboanga City in August 1974. While pursuing Uzman Sali's Group that massacred B.Gen. Teodulfo Bautista, Palparan and his Delta Company, 24IB encountered the group of about 150 rebels in Mt Sinumaan, Patikul, Sulu on February 24, 1978. He lost 13 soldiers and many others were wounded in a day long encounter. The MNLF suffered 21 killed in action. 2nd.Lt. Palparan was awarded a Gold Cross Medal. He retired from his military career on September 11, 2006, on his 56th birthday.

=== Anti-communism ===
Palparan was assigned in Mindoro and Romblon from May 2001 to April 2003 as commander of the 204th Brigade.

From February to August 2005, Palparan was the Commanding General of the 8th Infantry (Storm Troopers) Division in Eastern Visayas. He has been credited with reducing the rebel presence in Samar by 80 percent, and claims he could have eliminated the rebel presence completely had he been given an extension of duty. From September 2005 until his retirement in September 2006, Palparan was the Commanding General of the 7th Infantry (Kaugnay) Division in Central Luzon.

In the 2006 State of the Nation Address, President Gloria Macapagal Arroyo acknowledged Palparan's successes in offensives against members of the New People's Army.

=== Human rights abuses ===
Palparan has been accused of having a role in extrajudicial abductions and killings of government critics during his military service. He has denied any link to any such killings, and has been cleared of rights abuses by the military through an internal and informal investigation in which no records were kept. A probe by the Philippine Commission on Human Rights has also found that there is no direct evidence indicating that Palparan is the mastermind, but there is circumstantial evidence linking some members of the military, to the killings. The Melo Report stated that, "there is certainly evidence pointing the finger of suspicion at some elements and personalities in the armed forces, in particular General Palparan, as responsible for an undetermined number of killings, by allowing, tolerating, and even encouraging the killings."

=== Iraq War ===
Palparan was commander of the Philippine Humanitarian Contingent in Iraq, a force of 51 troops deployed in Iraq from July 2003 to July 2004. Following the withdrawal of Philippine troops from Iraq, Palparan was promoted to the rank of Major General in October 2004.

== Political career ==
=== House of Representatives ===
Following his retirement from the military, Palparan has become the figurehead of Bantay, a political party that advocates anti-communism. In the 2007 congressional elections, Bantay garnered 169,869 votes and ranked 32nd among party-list groups, which was insufficient to allow it to send any representative to congress under the formula used at the time. However, in April 2009, the Supreme Court ruled that the number of seats in the House of Representatives be increased by 55, adopting a new formula for allotting seats to party list representatives. The ruling allowed Bantay to send Palparan as its representative to the House, and he was proclaimed on April 24, 2009.

=== Senate bid ===
He ran as an independent candidate for the Senate of the Philippines in the 2010 Philippine Senate election where he lost and placed 43rd in the race. He also ran in the 2016 Philippine Senate election, sending his son, JC Palparan, to file his certificate for candidacy. He subsequently lost once again and placed 39th (out of 50 candidates) in the race for Senate, where he received only 1.90% of votes.

== The disappearance of Sherlyn Cadapan and Karen Empeño ==
On June 26, 2006, Cadapan and Empeño who were both alumni of the University of the Philippines Diliman were abducted by military men in Hagonoy, Bulacan, during the tenure of President Gloria Macapagal Arroyo, and were accused of being members of the Communist Party of the Philippines. This incident took place at a time when Central Luzon was being driven by a fierce conflict between the government and the communist New People's Army. According to the official investigation, eyewitness Raymond Manalo stated that Palparan tortured Cadapan by hitting her mouth and punching her breasts and stomach area until they bled. Palparan also slammed wooden planks against the victim so that Cadapan would admit she is a communist, while Sherlyn kept on saying that she wanted to go home to her parents. Manalo also noted that he saw the military stealing from nearby villagers, burning dead bodies using gasoline, and shooting a farmer riding a carabao.

Manalo's account also noted that in April 2007, he saw Cadapan lying naked on a chair that had fallen on the floor, her wrist tied together, one leg tied down, while being hit by wooden planks, electrocuted, and afterwards being half-drowned. The military also played with her body, poking wooden objects inside Cadapan's vagina, after finding out that Cadapan was going to write a letter to somebody. Cadapan, due to intense torture, blurted out that the letter was Empeño's idea. The military then dragged Empeño out from her cell, stripped her naked, tied her wrists and ankles, beaten, water-tortured, burned with cigarettes, and raped with pieces of wood. Manalo afterwards washed the two women's clothes, including their panties drenched with blood. Manalo also noted that the bucket of urine of the two women were filled with "chunks of blood".

=== Indictment and arrest ===
On December 15, 2011, Palparan was indicted for 2 counts of kidnapping and serious illegal detention in connection with the abduction of Cadapan and Empeño in 2006.

Despite claims that he would face all charges, he was caught attempting to leave the country on December 20, 2011, as a result of a hold departure order. He was not detained since the warrant was only released that afternoon and Palparan had gone into hiding. A manhunt was undertaken to find Palparan. A reward of PHP500,000 (approximately US$10,000) was posted for information leading to the capture of Palparan. Also charged were Lt. Col. Felipe Anotado and Master Sgt. Rizal Hilario, Staff Sgt. Edgardo Osorio. On January 5, 2012, the reward was raised to PHP1,000,000 (approximately US$20,000). On August 16, 2012, a PHP2 million reward was offered for information leading to Palparan's arrest.

After years of hiding, Palparan was arrested by the National Bureau of Investigation in August 2014 in a neighborhood of Santa Mesa, Manila. Palparan did not resist arrest.

On December 14, 2015, the Malolos Regional Trial Court (RTC) Branch 15 rejected Palparan's bid to be released on bail despite his plea that he is running for Senate.

=== Conviction ===
On September 17, 2018, Palparan and his associates, former lieutenant colonel Felipe Anotado and former staff sergeant Edgardo Osorio, were found guilty of kidnapping and serious illegal detention over the forced disappearances of Cadapan and Empeno in 2006. The court sentenced them to reclusión perpetua and ordered each of them to pay ₱100,000 in civil indemnities and ₱200,000 for moral damages.

Palparan appealed against his conviction the following day. On November 15, 2018, the Malolos City Regional Trial Court Branch 15 ultimately denied Palparan's plea, stating that Palparan failed to present new arguments in his motion for reconsideration filed on September 18 to convince the court to reverse its decision.

In 2022, the Court of Appeals affirmed the conviction and modified the interests of the penalty, imposing a sentence of reclusión perpetua "without eligibility for parole" and "a 6-percent annual interest on the ₱300,000 civil indemnity and moral damages to be paid to the families of Cadapan and Empeño from the date of finality of the decision until full payment".

=== Acquittal in the Manalo brothers case ===
On October 6, 2023, the Malolos Regional Trial Court Branch 19 acquitted Palparan on the charges against kidnapping, serious illegal detention, and serious physical injuries brought against him by the National Union of Peoples' Lawyers (NUPL) on behalf of the two farmer brothers, Raymond and Reynaldo Manalo, as well as the parents of Cadapan and Empeño. NUPL and other supporters of the Manalo brothers expressed disappointment with the court's ruling.

The rights group KARAPATAN condemned the decision of the Malolos RTC alleging the court dismissed the accounts of Manalo brothers which was validated by the higher court, the rights group expressed their disappointment on the court verdict referring it as "unspeakable act", invalidates the traumatic experiences of the Manalo brothers.

In a statement, Malolos RTC cited inconsistencies between the affidavit statements and the testimonies of the Manalo brothers in court. The court referenced a previous case (The Secretary of National Defense, et al. vs. Raymond Manalo and Reynaldo Manalo, G.R. No. 180906, October 7, 2008) and pointed out differences in Raymond Manalo's statements, such as mentioning being 'dragged to Reynaldo's house' in contrast to the previous case where he was said to be taken in a white L300 van. The court also highlighted inconsistencies regarding the location of their incarceration. Additionally, the court noted other discrepancies, including Raymond's encounters with Palparan and an inconsistent 2007 affidavit describing their first meeting at a basketball court.

Raymond Manalo, one of the main complainants also expressed his disbelief as the higher court had supported their case using the same testimony presented on the RTC court.

== Electoral history ==
Electoral history of Jovito Palparan
Year	Office	Party	Votes received				Result
Year	Office	Party	Total	%	P.	Swing	Result
2007	Representative (Party-list)	Bantay	169,869	1.11%	30th	—N/a	Won
2010	Senator of the Philippines	IND	825,208	2.16	43rd	—N/a	Lost
2016	Senator of the Philippines	IND	855,297	1.90	39th	-0.26	Lost
