= Antonio Nafarrete =

Philippine Army general

- Official Portrait as WESTMINCOM Commander, 2024
- Born: Antonio Gustilo Nafarrete; February 22, 1969 (age 57); Manila, Philippines
- Education: Philippine Military Academy (BS); Philippine Christian University (MPA)
- Spouse: Patrizia M. Nafarrete
- Children: 2
- Military career
- Allegiance: Philippines
- Branch: Philippine Army
- Service years: 1990 – Present
- Rank: General
- Nickname: "Toto"
- Service number: O-10291
- Commands: Chief of Staff of the Armed Forces of the Philippines; Commanding General of the Philippine Army; Western Mindanao Command; 6th Infantry Division; 1st Infantry Division; Joint Task Force Zampelan; Deputy Chief of Staff for Operations, J3; 1101st Infantry Brigade; 1st Scout Ranger Battalion
- Conflicts: Communist armed conflicts in the Philippines; Moro conflict

Antonio Gustilo Nafarrete (born February 22, 1969) is a Philippine Army general who has served as the 61st and incumbent Chief of Staff of the Armed Forces of the Philippines. Prior to his assumption to the position, Nafarrete previously served as commander of the AFP Western Mindanao Command, and also led two divisions, namely the 6th Infantry Division and the 1st Infantry Division and the 67th Commanding General of the Philippine Army.

== Early life and education ==
Nafarrete was born on 22 February 1969 in Manila and is the fourth child among six siblings. His father, Perpetuo Nafarrete, is a local attorney from Pangasinan, while his mother, Maria Daisy Gustilo-Nafarette, is a former public school teacher from La Paz, Iloilo, and was once a teacher at the Ramon Magsaysay High School, and still currently serves as an active board director of the family's rural bank, the Rural Bank of Calinog (Iloilo), Inc. Nafarrete often visits his grandmother's family-owned rice and sugarcane fields in Calinog, Iloilo during the summer season and later moved to the province in his elementary years. He finished his elementary schooling at the Calinog Elementary School in 1982 and eventually finished high school at the West Visayas State University in 1986 and later became interested in entering the Philippine Military Academy (PMA) during a career orientation held in the university.

Nafarrete later entered the PMA in 1986 amidst the Coup attempts against Corazon Aquino during 1986 to 1987, and eventually became part of the Alpha Company of his batch and later became the company's squad and platoon commander. During his years in the PMA, Nafarrete is described as an average student and only excelled in subjects such as military history, military leadership, military sciences, and social studies; and was inspired by the leadership skills of former AFP Chiefs General Lisandro Abadia, who formerly served as the Commandant of Cadets, and General Rodolfo Biazon, who was once the Superintendent of the PMA, amidst the continuous coup attempts during the Presidency of Corazon Aquino. He later graduated as part of the PMA "Bigkis-Lahi" Class of 1990.

Nafarrete also hold a Master of Public Administration from the Philippine Christian University in Ermita, Manila in 2013 and also completed various military courses, such as the Basic Airborne Course, the Special Operations Qualification Course, the Scout Ranger Course in 1991, and the Joint Command and General Staff Course at the Armed Forces of the Philippines Command and General Staff College. Nafarrete also completed the Military Intelligence Officer Course, the Infantry Officer Basic Course, the Psychological Operations Course; the Comprehensive Security Responses to Terrorism Course at the Asia-Pacific Center for Security Studies in Honolulu, Hawaii; the Infantry Officer Advanced Course, the Peace Keeping Support Operations Training Course, and the United Nations Military Observer Course. He also completed the Specialized English Training Course at Lackland Air Force Base, Bexar County, Texas; the United States Army Rangers Course in 1995 at Fort Benning, Georgia, and also completed both the Joint Transition Course and Joint Professional Military Education Course at the National Defense University in Fort Lesley J. McNair, Washington, D.C., USA.

== Military career ==
After his graduation in the PMA, Nafarrete was commissioned as a second lieutenant and was later named as a platoon commander of Alpha Company of the 10th Infantry Battalion, which is under the 1st Infantry Division. He later became a pioneer in organizing the 1st Scout Ranger Company of the 1st Scout Ranger Regiment during its reactivation in 1991. Nafarrete later served under various infantry and special forces units, primarily under the 1st Scout Ranger Regiment, and was deployed to counter New People’s Army (NPA) units across Kalinga, Apayao, the Negros Island, Cotabato, and Maguindanao; as well as Abu Sayyaf terrorists in the Zamboanga Peninsula and Basilan. In 1996, Nafarrete served as the commander of the 6th Scout Ranger Company, a Scout Ranger unit serving under the 6th Infantry Division. In 1997 to 1999, Nafarrete would later serve as intelligence and operations officer of the 2nd Scout Ranger Battalion, and later as an intelligence officer of the 1st Scout Ranger Regiment. During his years as a senior officer, Nafarrete served under the AFP Joint Special Operations Group, and later became the battalion commander of the 1st Scout Ranger Battalion from 2008 to 2010. After his stint as battalion commander of the 1st Scout Ranger Battalion, Naffarete was later placed under the Presidential Security Group (PSG) from 2011 to 2015, where he serves as the group's Assistant Chief of Staff for Operations, G3, Stage Commander, Head of Security, and as Chief of Staff. Naffarete also monitored security operations of former President Benigno Aquino III, as well as visiting foreign heads of state and dignitaries, and later served as the Chairman of the Government of the Philippines’ Coordinating Committee on the Cessation of Hostilities.

After his stint in the PSG, Nafarrete later served as the Deputy Chief for Administration of the Western Mindanao Command, where he also assisted implementing internal defense operations within the region, and was later named as brigade commander of the 1101st Infantry Brigade of the 11th Infantry Division, where he initiated the Balik-Barangay program in Patikul, Sulu, and was later named as the Army Deputy Chief of Staff for Operations, OJ3, Executive Officer of the Army Chief of Staff for Operations, OJ3; and soon became the Army Chief of Staff for Operations, OJ3. Afterwards, Nafarrete was later named as the Deputy Chief of Staff for Operations, J3. On 11 August 2022, Nafarrete was named as the division commander of the 1st Infantry Division, where he subsequently served as commander of the Joint Task Force Zampelan. During his stint as the division commander of the 1st Infantry Division, Nafarrete led intensified military operations against the NPA, which is tasked to dismantle the NPA's final guerilla front in the region, known as the Western Mindanao Regional Party Committee, while continuing development initiatives in conflict-affected communities.

On 23 July 2024, Nafarrete was named as the division commander of the 6th Infantry Division, where he later oversaw counter-terrorism operations against the NPA and the Dawlah Islamiya. Nafarrete also led civil-military operations that led to the surrender of a variety of NPA members, as well as 420 Bangsamoro Islamic Freedom Fighters and Dawlah Islamiya members. On 20 November 2024, Nafarrete was named as the Acting Commander of the AFP Western Mindanao Command (WESTMINCOM), where he replaced Lieutenant General William N. Gonzales and later served as the command's commander. As the commander of WESTMINCOM, Nafarrete spearheaded intensified multi-domain operations against the remnants of the NPA, Abu Sayyaf, and Dawlah Islamiya, and also intensified community peacebuilding initiatives in the BARMM. Nafarrete also oversaw election seccurity measures amidst the 2025 Philippine general election.

=== Commanding General of the Philippine Army ===
On 31 July 2025, Nafarrete was named as the new Commanding General of the Philippine Army (CGPA) and replaced Lieutenant General Roy Galido, who is retiring after ending his two-year fixed term. During his assumption speech, Nafarrete highlights his command's focus on human capital development, and emphasized the importance of every soldier. Nafarrete's five-point command guidance tackles on personnel, morale, physical & mental well-being, education, and finances, while also continuing the army's modernization programs through the procurement of new systems and modern hardware to enhance the army's overall capabilities. During his term as the CGPA, Nafarrete initiated plans to integrate drones in the army's external defense operations and expand the usage of drone warfare in the army's defense doctrine to all units ranging from both active and reserve units, and highlighted the usage of drones in the modern battlefield, citing the successful usage of drones for various military operations on the Russian invasion of Ukraine. Nafarrete also expanded the integration and training of the army reserve units with regular army units to sustain the army's capabilities, interoperability, and professional development, while also increasing support measures on the developments on both the Reserve Officers’ Training Corps (ROTC) and the Total Defense Force Concept.

Nafarrete also laid out proposals to upgrade the present Army Artillery Regiment (AAR) to the Army Artillery Command (AAC), which will allow the Army to increase its abilities aside from the current short to long-ranged howitzers and mortar systems currently in service, and laid out procurement plans for medium-ranged weapons systems and ground-based air defense systems, which includes both gun-based and missile-based systems. The plan could also allow the AFP Strategic Command to lay out plans for procuring long-ranged weapons systems.

=== Chief of Staff of the AFP ===
On 21 July 2026, Nafarrete assumed command as the Chief of Staff of the Armed Forces of the Philippines and replaced General Romeo Brawner Jr., who served as the first AFP Chief to complete his three-year fixed term under Republic Act 11939. In his assumption speech, Nafarrete stated that the AFP is entering a "critical phase" as it shifts from internal defense to external defense operations. Nafarrete also vowed to strengthen the country's territorial defense and further implement the Comprehensive Archipelagic Defense Concept (CADC), while also strengthening partnership with like-minded nations and preserve the gains made against insurgency and terrorism. He also added that he will continue investing in human capital to the modernization programs in order to build a fully integrated and capable defense network.

== Awards from military service ==
- Officer, Philippine Legion of Honor
- Distinguished Service Star with one bronze anahaw leaf (awarded on 2013)
- Gold Cross Medals with two bronze anahaw leaves (three total medals awarded on 1998 and 1999)
- Meritorious Achievement Medal with one bronze anahaw leaf
- Distinguished Service Medal
- Chief of Staff, AFP Commendation Medal
- Gawad sa Kaunlaran Medal
- Bronze Cross Medal
- Silver Wing Medal with two bronze anahaw leaves
- Military Merit Medal with two silver spearhead devices
- Military Merit Medal with three silver anahaw leaves
- Military Merit Medal with four anahaw leaves
- Sagisag ng Ulirang Kawal Medal
- Parangal sa Kapanalig ng Sandatahang Lakas ng Pilipinas Medals with one bronze anahaw leaf
- Parangal sa Kapanalig ng Sandatahang Lakas ng Pilipinas Medals
- Military Commendation Medal with three silver and one bronze equilateral triangles
- Presidential Security Service Ribbon
- Long Service Medal with three service stars
- Anti-dissidence Campaign Medal with two service stars
- Luzon Anti-dissidence Campaign Medal
- Visayas Anti-Dissidence Campaign Medal
- Mindanao Anti-dissidence Campaign Medal with one campaign star
- Northern Maritime Frontier Campaign Medal
- Disaster Relief and Rehabilitation Operations Ribbon

=== Unit decorations ===
- Presidential Unit Citation
- People Power II Revolution Unit Citation
- Presidential Streamer Citation

=== Badges ===
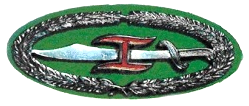
- Combat Commander's Kagitingan Badge
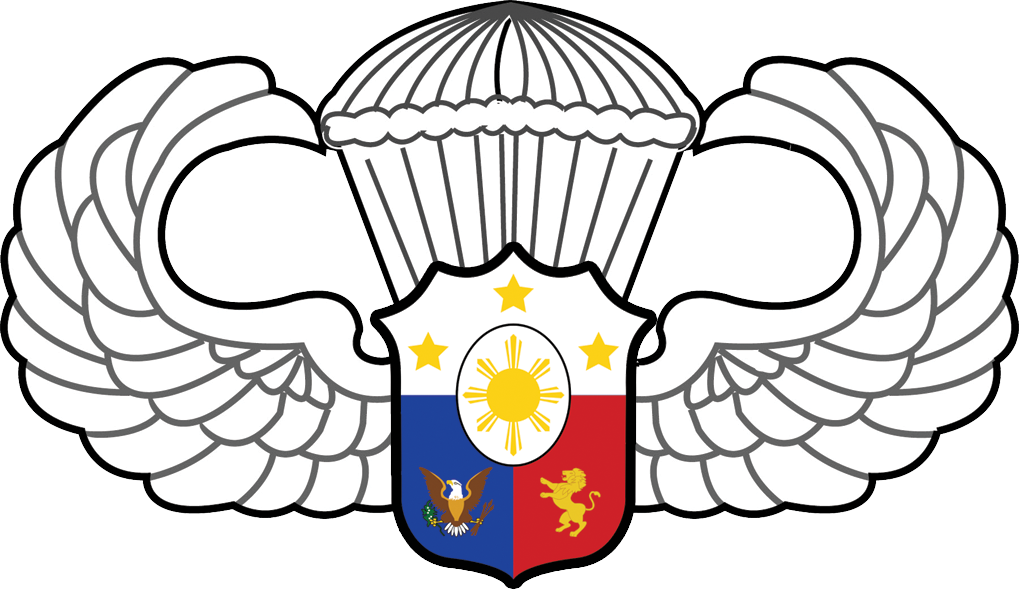
- AFP Parachutist Badge
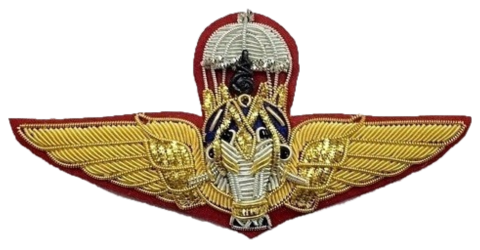
- Honorary Army Basic Parachutist Badge from the Royal Thai Army
- Scout Ranger Qualification Badge
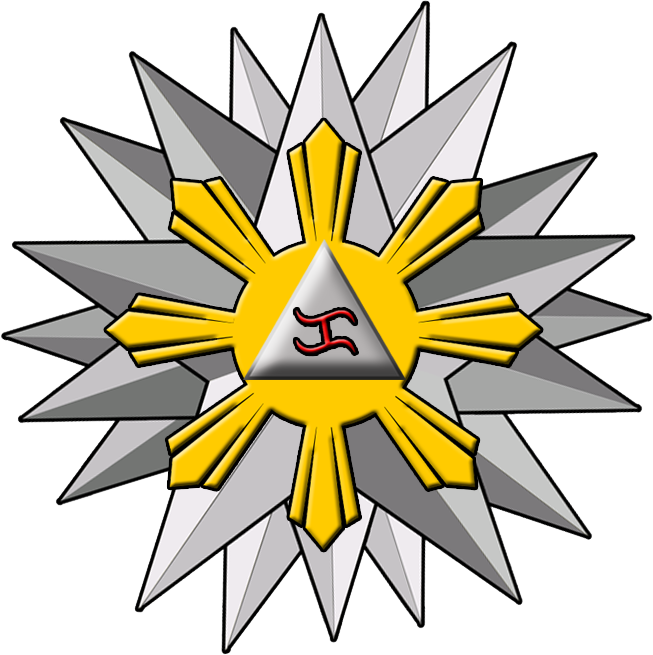
- Joint Command and General Staff Course Completion Badge

=== Other awards ===
- Best Junior Officer of 1st Scout Ranger Regiment (1996)
- Junior Officer of the Year Award (1998)
- Best Scout Ranger Battalion (awarded during his stint as commander of the 1st Scout Ranger Battalion) (2008)

== Personal life ==
Known by his peers as "Toto", Nafarrete is married to Dra. Patrizia M. Nafarrete, and they have fraternal twins, Antonio Miguel and Anna Mikaela.

Military offices
| Preceded by Lt. Gen. Roy Galido | Commanding General of the Philippine Army; 2025–2026 | Succeeded by Lt. Gen. Donald Gumiran |
| Preceded by Gen. Romeo Brawner Jr. | Chief of Staff of the Armed Forces of the Philippines; 2026–present | Incumbent |
| Preceded by Angelo Jimenez as President of the University of the Philippines | Order of Precedence of the Philippines as Chief of Staff of the Armed Forces of the Philippines | Succeeded by Heads of permanent United Nations Agencies in the Philippines who hold the rank of Director |
