= Patikul massacre =

1977 killing of soldiers in the Philippines

Coordinates: 6.0630°N 121.1023°E

- Part of the Moro conflict
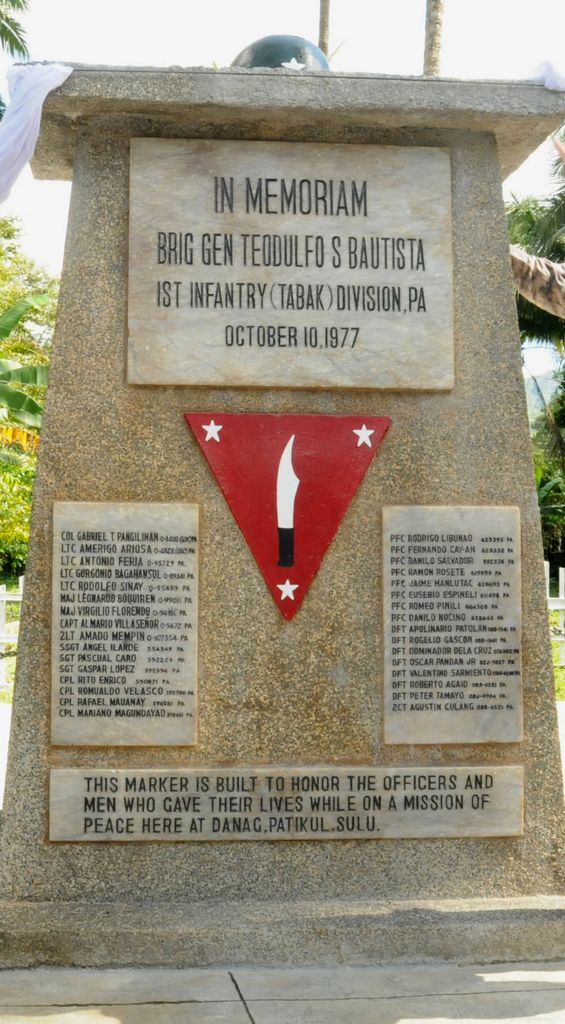
- Memorial to AFP Brig. Gen. Teodulfo Bautista and his 35 men who were killed in Danag, Patikul, Sulu
Date	October 10, 1977
Location	Patikul, Sulu, Philippines
Result	MNLF victory: Brigader General Teodulfo Bautista is Assassinated

Belligerents
Philippine Army	Moro National Liberation Front

Commanders and leaders
Brig. Gen. Teodulfo Bautista X Col. Gabriel Pangillnan X Lt. Col. Amerigo Ariosa X Lt. Col. Antonio Feria X Lt. Col. Gorgonio Bagahansul X Lt. Col. Rodolfo Sinay X	Usman Sali

Units involved
1st Infantry Division	unknown

Strength
36	150 men

Casualties and losses
35 killed (9 of whom were officers)	none

The Patikul massacre refers to an event that took place on October 10, 1977 in Patikul, Sulu province in the Philippines. Thirty-five officers and men of the Philippine Army were killed by elements of the Moro National Liberation Front under Usman Sali. Among the dead were Brigadier General Teodulfo Bautista, commanding general of the 1st Infantry Division, Adjutant General of the Armed Forces of the Philippines, Col. Gabriel Pangilinan and four lieutenant colonels.

== The massacre ==
Usman Sali, the leader of a group of MNLF rebels, had earlier agreed to meet with Gen. Bautista at the headquarters of the 1st Infantry "Tabak" Division in Jolo for a peace dialogue. At the last minute, Sali changed his mind and proposed to meet Gen. Bautista at a public market in Barangay Danag, Patikul. Bautista agreed and on the way to Patikul, was accompanied by Col. Gabriel Pangilinan, his classmate at the Philippine Military Academy. Earlier, Bautista had invited Fidel V. Ramos, then Chief of the Philippine Constabulary to join him but the latter demurred due to a previous engagement in Zamboanga City.

When the General and his troops arrived at the market aboard two army trucks, the place was deserted. Sali was not there to meet Bautista, so the General and his men sat down at a table to await his arrival. At that point gunfire broke out and Bautista and his men were mowed down. The bodies were later found to have sustained hack wounds. All of the Army soldiers died, except for a sergeant, the group's radioman, who survived by playing dead.

A testimony of the survivor stated that General Bautista along with his men entered the town that was surrounded by 150 to 200 MNLF fighters, General Bautista then met and faced Usman Sali, to which, Sali exclaimed "Dapal!" (hit the dirt!) and dropped to the ground, about 150 of his men emerged around them and gunned General Bautista and his men down, killing them.

Although some reports indicate that Usman Sali died during subsequent government operations, others state that he escaped to Sabah, Malaysia after the incident.

=== Retaliation ===
Two Military divisions were deployed to the island of Jolo in a manhunt for Usman Sali, Ferdinand Marcos Sr. Also offered $3,000 to anyone who could capture Sali

Hatimil Hassan, A leader of the MNLF claimed that Philippine soldiers massacred 400 Moro Muslims in retaliation for the Massacre, The Philippine government however denied this claim

== Memorials ==
Then-president Ferdinand Marcos, in his eulogy to the fallen, stated that Gen. Bautista and his men were "killed with perfidy and treachery", and that the massacre "conclusively brands the MNLF as the violator of the ceasefire agreement".

In 2012, Bautista's son, then-Commanding General of the Philippine Army Emmanuel T. Bautista inaugurated a museum in Camp General Teodulfo Bautista in Barangay Busbus, Jolo. The Army camp is named in honor of his late father.

A stone memorial to those killed was restored in 2009 by the Philippine Marine Corps, Joint Special Operations Task Force-Philippines, and residents of Barangay Danag.
