= Leoncio S. Tan =

Leoncio Tan

Commanding General, Philippine Army
- In office 1957–1958
- Preceded by: Alfonso Arellano
- Succeeded by: Tirso G. Fajardo

Commander, I Military Area District
- In office 1954–1956
- Succeeded by: Tirso G. Fajardo

Director, National Bureau of Investigation
- In office 1954–1956
- Preceded by: Jose Crisol
- Succeeded by: Jose Lukban

Leoncio Tan (1910 - 1986) was a Philippine Army Brigadier General who became its 11th Commanding General. He was also a World War II veteran who fought in the Battle of Bataan. He was also appointed by President Ramon Magsaysay as fifth Director of National Bureau of Investigation in 1954.

== Background ==
Tan was born on 1910 in Manila, he attended Philippine Constabulary Academy in 1925 and graduated in1928. He served as Philippine Constabulary Officer upon graduation. In 1936 he transferred to Philippine Army upon its establishment by Commonwealth of the Philippines.

=== World War II ===
In 1941, he served as battalion commander with 21st Infantry Division under Brigadier General Mateo Capinpin. He fought in Bataan from January 1942 to April 1942. He survived the Death March and became POW and was released in August. He joined guerilla unit and fought Japanese occupiers. He rejoined Philippine Army upon its reestablishment of Philippine Government. He served as Battalion Commander from 1948 - 1951. He was promoted to Colonel and appointed commander II Military District.

== Directorship National Bureau of Investigation ==
In 1954 he was promoted to full Colonel and was appointed by President Magsaysay as director of National Bureau of Investigation to replace Jose Crisol. He served as its director for a few years before transferring back to Philippine Army.

=== Back to Philippine Army ===
Tan was designated as commander of 1st Infantry Division upon its reestablishment after deactivating since after its surrender in 1941.

=== Commanding General ===
In 1957, Tan was promoted as Brigadier General and was appointed as Commanding General of the Philippine Army. He took the initiative to have a separate Headquarters and Staffs of Philippine Army from the Armed Forces of the Philippines (AFP) Headquarters. He retired in 1958 and was replaced by Brigadier General Tirso G. Fajardo.
