= Marcelo Blando =

Filipino general

Marcelo C. Blando
- Born: Santa Maria, Pangasinan, Philippines
- Military career
- Allegiance: Republic of the Philippines
- Branch: Philippine Army Armed Forces of the Philippines
- Service years: 1956–1991
- Rank: Brigadier General
- Nickname: Mar
- Commands: 1st Scout Ranger Regiment, 7th Infantry (Kaugnay) Division

Marcelo C. Blando, is a retired Philippine Brigadier General turned farmer. He graduated from the Philippine Military Academy in 1960 and commanded the Philippines’ 1st Scout Ranger Regiment and the Philippine Army's 7th Infantry (Kaugnay) Division. In the late 1980s Blando was a leading figure in the Reform the Armed Forces Movement (RAM), involved in the failed 1989 coup d'état that almost toppled the administration of then President Corazon Aquino. After three years of incarceration, Blando was granted amnesty by the government and officially retired from the Armed Forces of the Philippines in 1991.

== Post-military career ==
After his military service, Blando ventured into farming and is now fostering a new revolutionary struggle, which he brands as the "Reform the Agriculture Movement". Its main agenda is to reduce poverty and to eradicate hunger by advocating modern agricultural practice in the countryside and farmer empowerment through institutional development.

Highlights of Gen. Blando's activities include being founding chairman of the Paitan multi-purpose cooperative, and later the chairman of the much larger Pangasinan Farmers' Co-operative. He was also founding president of the Mango Industry Network. From 1996 to 2004, he was chairman of the Pangasinan Provincial Agriculture and Fisheries Council and was elected chair of the Regional Agriculture and Fisheries Council in 2004, representing Region 1, made up of four provinces (Ilocos Norte, Ilocos Sur, Pangasinan and La Union).

Other significant activities include: Selected as "Farmer Scientist" on mango by Philippine Council for Agriculture Research Resources Development (PCARRD), Department of Science and Technology (DOST);

Active participant in Community Based Participatory Action Research under the Bureau of Agricultural Research, Department of Agriculture (Philippines);
Agriculture Representative for Region I Association of Non-Government Organizations;
Agriculture Representative (farmer) Region I Development Council - San Fernando, La Union;
Co-operator in field trials of BT, RR and Stack Trait corn conducted by Monsanto Company - Philippines;
Member of National Biosafety Committee under Bureau of Plant Industry (BPI); :Involved in the development of information and communication technology (K-Agri Net) to be adapted by farmers.

Blando is married to the former Nelia Tidor of Balungao, Pangasinan
