= Disappearance of Sherlyn Cadapan and Karen Empeño =

2006 missing person case in the Philippines

Sherlyn Cadapan and Karen Empeño
- Cadapan (left) and Empeño (right)
- Born: Cadapan: 1976 or 1977; Empeño: 1983 or 1984; Metro Manila, Philippines (both)
- Disappeared: June 26, 2006; Hagonoy, Bulacan, Philippines
- Status: Missing for 19 years, 10 months and 17 days
- Education: University of the Philippines Diliman

Sherlyn Cadapan (1976 or 1977 – disappeared June 26, 2006) and Karen Empeño (1983 or 1984 – disappeared June 26, 2006) were students who both disappeared in Hagonoy, Bulacan, on June 26, 2006, while doing their school project.

== Background ==
Sherlyn Cadapan was the second child born in the Cadapan family and was a sport science senior at the time of her disappearance. According to her mother, Linda Cadapan, she was a sprinter under the varsity scholarship. Cadapan also had joined protests against the rising fuel prices and human rights abuses under the Arroyo administration; her political views disappointed her mother back then. Karen Empeño was a graduating sociology student and she was described as friendly by her mother.

== Disappearance ==
On June 26, 2006, Cadapan and Empeño, both alumni of the University of the Philippines Diliman, were abducted by military men in Hagonoy, Bulacan, during the tenure of President Gloria Macapagal Arroyo, and were accused of being members of the Communist Party of the Philippines. This incident took place at the time of a fierce conflict in Central Luzon between the government and the communist New People's Army. According to the official investigation, eyewitness Raymond Manalo stated that General Jovito Palparan tortured Cadapan by hitting her mouth and punching her breasts and stomach area until they bled. Palparan also slammed wooden planks against the victim so that Cadapan would admit to being a communist, while Cadapan kept on saying that she wanted to go home to her parents. Manalo also noted that he saw the military stealing from nearby villagers, burning dead bodies using gasoline, and shooting a man who was riding a carabao due to farm work. Manalo's account also noted that in April 2007, he saw Cadapan lying naked on a chair that had fallen on the floor, her wrists tied together and one leg tied down, while being hit by wooden planks, electrocuted, and afterwards being half-drowned. The military also played with her body, poking wooden objects inside Cadapan's vagina, after finding out that Cadapan was going to write a letter to somebody. Cadapan, due to intense torture, blurted out that the letter was Empeño's idea. The military then dragged Empeño out from her cell, stripped her naked, tied her wrists and ankles, then beat her, subjected her to water torture, burned her with cigarettes, and raped her with pieces of wood. Manalo afterwards washed the two women's clothes, including their blood-drenched panties. He also noted that the bucket containing urine from the two women was filled with 'chunks of blood'.

== Aftermath ==
The parents and family members of Cadapan and Empeño led the filing of the seventh impeachment complaint against president Gloria Macapagal Arroyo on July 26, 2006. Upon newer allegations of torture toward disappeared activists in general, Cadapan and Empeño's respective mothers Erlinda and Concepcion filed alongside Jose de Venecia III and Harry Roque another impeachment complaint against president Arroyo on October 14, 2008. Both complaints, however, were ultimately rejected in Congress.

Former general and former congressman Jovito Palparan–known as Berdugo ("Butcher") for his involvement–was implicated by the Philippine government in 2011 for kidnapping, torture, and murder. According to human rights group Karapatan, Palparan is implicated in 326 human rights violations involving 1,219 victims in Oriental Mindoro, where Palparan was assigned from 2001 to 2003.

Palparan was arrested in 2014 for the disappearances of Cadapan and Empeño. Palparan ran for senator in the 2016 elections, but lost.

Forced disappearances are commemorated every All Saints' Day by their relatives.

=== Conviction ===
On September 17, 2018, Palparan was sentenced to life imprisonment after being convicted for his involvement in the disappearances. Lieutenant Colonel Felipe Anotado and S/Sgt. Edgardo Osorio were convicted alongside Palparan for the kidnapping of Cadapan and Empeño.

== See also ==
- Extrajudicial killings and forced disappearances in the Philippines
- List of people who disappeared mysteriously (2000–present)
