= Romeo Espino =

Filipino general (1914–2003)

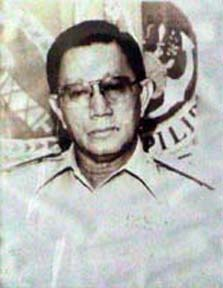

Chief of Staff of the Armed Forces of the Philippines
- In office January 15, 1972 – August 15, 1981
- President: Ferdinand Marcos
- Preceded by: Manuel Yan
- Succeeded by: Fabian Ver

The Deputy Chief of Staff, AFP
- In office January 13, 1971 – May 29, 1972
- Preceded by: Eugenio Acab
- Succeeded by: Rafael Ileto

Commanding General, Philippine Army
- In office January 13, 1967 – May 29, 1968
- Preceded by: Santos Garcia
- Succeeded by: Ruben Maglaya

Personal details
- Born: Romeo C. Espino; December 20, 1914
- Died: February 17, 2003 (aged 88)
- Resting place: Libingan ng mga Bayani
- Spouse: Bella Espino
- Children: 5
- Education: University of the Philippines

Military service
- Allegiance: Philippines
- Branch/service: Philippine Army
- Years of service: 1941–1981
- Commands: Chief of Staff, Armed Forces of the Philippines; Office of the Commanding General of the Philippine Army; 1st Infantry Division
- Battles/wars: World War II; Communist rebellion in the Philippines; Moro conflict

Romeo C. Espino (December 20, 1914 – February 17, 2003) was a Filipino general who served as Chief of Staff of the Armed Forces of the Philippines from 1972 to 1981.

== Early life and education ==
Espino was born on December 20, 1914, and was a native of Samal, Bataan. He finished his college education at the University of the Philippines in 1937.

== Career ==
Espino joined the Philippine Army in 1941 as a Reserve Officers' Training Corps (ROTC) officer and fought against the Japanese during their occupation of the Philippines in World War II. He served as Commanding General of the Philippine Army from January 13, 1967, until May 29, 1968.

On January 15, 1972, then President Ferdinand Marcos appointed him as Chief of Staff of the Armed Forces of the Philippines succeeding Manuel Yan. He was also an implementer of the martial law of President Marcos. He was also named part of the Rolex 12 due to being a close associate of Marcos. Named members of the Rolex 12 allegedly received luxury watches from Marcos hence the label.

He led the military against the Communist rebellion of the New People's Army (NPA) and the Moro National Liberation Front in the Moro conflict. He was credited for the arrest of NPA leader Bernabe Buscayno and defector Victor Corpus in 1976. Espino ended his tenure on August 15, 1981, and was replaced by Fabian Ver. He is the longest serving Chief of Staff serving for 9 years, 7 months.

Espino also headed the Philippine Red Cross from 1975 to 1998, concurrently while AFP Chief, and after it.

== Death ==
Espino died on February 17, 2003, and was buried at the Libingan ng mga Bayani by virtue of being a former Chief of Staff.

== Personal life ==
Espino was married to Bella Espino, with whom he had five children.
