= UNGCI =

UN mission in Iraq from 1991 to 2003

United Nations Guards Contingent in Iraq
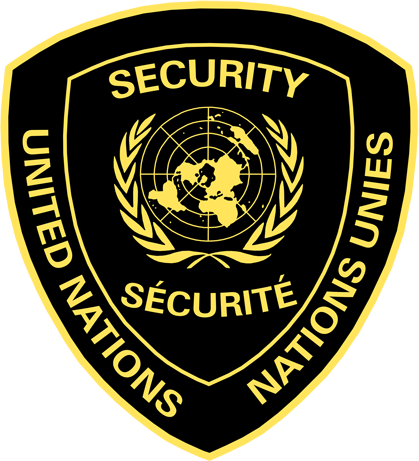
- Patch of the UNGCI mission
- Established: May 1991
- Type: Peacekeeping Mission
- Legal status: Disbanded
- Headquarters: Baghdad, Iraq
- Operated under the Oil-for-Food Programme from 1996; authorized by UN Security Council Resolutions 706 and 712

UNGCI United Nations Medal Ribbon

The United Nations Guards Contingent in Iraq (UNGCI) mission was based on U.N. resolutions 706/1991 and 712/1991, aimed at the safe flow of international humanitarian support for the people of Iraq following the liberation of Kuwait, and during the period of the trade embargo imposed against the government of Iraq. It existed from May 1991 to November 2003.

The international military and police forces provided secure work environments for civil elements of the program, and during the distribution of food and medical supplies by humanitarian organizations.

== History ==
An agreement on establishing the United Nations Guards Contingent in Iraq (UNGCI) was concluded in May 1991, and soon thereafter the first "guards" were on their way to Iraq to share in the security of engaged organizations.

During the summer of 1991, the UNGCI mission reached a level of 500 personnel that were delegated from the U.N. H.Q. in New York City, U.N. Geneva, U.N. Vienna, and the U.N. Kenya. National contingents of about 50 personnel originated from the following countries: Austria, Bangladesh, Czechoslovakia, Denmark, Fiji, Ghana, Greece, Nepal, the Philippines, Poland, Netherlands, and Thailand.

After a short training period in Baghdad, the guards moved initially to Erbil and Dohuk (in the northern part of Iraq) and were assigned to serve mostly in Kurdistan under three Sectors (Dohuk, Erbil, Sulaimaniyah), though some service was performed in the south of the country, in the area of Basra city.

From 1996, the mission continued under the auspices of the "Oil for Food" program.

The UNGCI mission was terminated in 2003.

== See also ==
- Oil-for-Food Programme
