= 3rd Infantry Division (Philippines) =

Military unit of Philippine Army

3rd Infantry "Spearhead" Division, Philippine Army
- Unit Seal of the 3ID, PA
- Active: July 01, 1946 – Present
- Country: Philippines
- Branch: Philippine Army
- Type: Infantry
- Role: Conventional warfare, counter-insurgency
- Size: 3 Brigades
- Part of: Philippine Army (Since 1946)
- Garrison/HQ: Camp Gen Macario Peralta Jr, Jamindan, Capiz
- Nickname: Spearhead Troopers
- Mottos: The Armed Peacekeepers for Peace and Progress
- Engagements: Anti-guerilla operations against the NPA and local criminal elements.

Commanders
- Current commander: MGen Joey A Escanillas PA
- Notable commanders: Maj. Gen. Fortunato Abat, AFP

Insignia
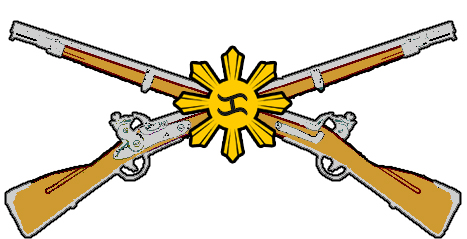
- Armed Forces Occupational Specialty Insignia

The 3rd Infantry Division, also known as the Spearhead Division, is a unit of the Philippine Army, based at Camp Gen Macario Peralta Jr in Jamindan, Capiz, Philippines.

== History ==
The 3rd Infantry Division, Philippine Army was established and they stationed at the general headquarters on Camp General Macario Peralta Jr in Jamindan, Capiz. The local troopers of the PA 3rd Infantry Division was sending the combat operations in Visayas region and the engagements of the Anti-Communist Operations and aiding the supported of the Philippine National Police against the Communist rebel groups of the New People's Army and all local element criminals.

The local government soldiers and officers of the Philippine Army 3rd Infantry Division was sending the combat operations in the Visayas Region from the main battles and invasion commands and helping the CAFGU militia groups and the supporting of the Philippine National Police and they fought against the communist rebel fighters of the New People's Army and they some local element criminals.

== Current Units ==
The Brigades under the 3rd Infantry Division:

- 301st Infantry (Bayanihan) Brigade, based in the town of Dingle, Iloilo
- 302nd Infantry (Achiever) Brigade, based in Tanjay City, Negros Oriental
- 303rd Infantry (Brown Eagle) Brigade, based in Camp Gerona, Murcia, Negros Occidental

The Battalions under the 3rd Infantry Division:

- 11th Infantry (Lapu-Lapu) Battalion
- 12th Infantry (Lick 'Em) Battalion
- 15th Infantry (Molave Warrior) Battalion
- 47th Infantry (Katapatan) Battalion
- 61st Infantry (Hunter) Battalion
- 62nd Infantry (Unifier) Battalion
- 79th Infantry (Masaligan) Battalion
- 82nd Infantry (Bantay Laya) Battalion
- 94th Infantry (Mandirigma) Battalion

The Support Units under the 3rd Infantry Division:

- 3rd Civil Military Operations Battalion
- 3rd Division Training School
- 3rd Division Training Unit
- 6th Forward Service Support Unit

== Operations ==
- The division's operations area covers the entire Western Visayas region, and the province of Negros Oriental in the Philippines. Its primary mission is counter-insurgency against local communist guerrilla operations, as well as supporting the Philippine National Police in combating organized crime.
