= Fortunato Abat =

Filipino general

Major General Fortunato Abat
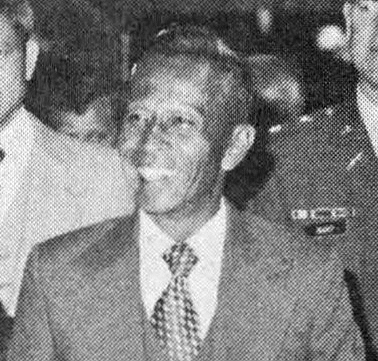

19th Secretary of National Defense of the Philippines
- In office September 16, 1997 – June 30, 1998
- President: Fidel V. Ramos
- Preceded by: Renato de Villa
- Succeeded by: Orly Mercado

Commanding General of the Philippine Army
- In office March 28, 1976 – March 27, 1981
- President: Ferdinand Marcos
- Preceded by: Rafael Zagala
- Succeeded by: Josephus Ramas

Ambassador of the Philippines to China
- In office May 1981 – February 1986
- President: Ferdinand Marcos

Personal details
- Born: June 10, 1925 San Juan, La Union, Philippine Islands
- Died: March 7, 2018 (aged 92) Quezon City, Philippines
- Resting place: Libingan ng mga Bayani
- Party: People's Reform Party
- Spouse: Corazon Briones Bulatao
- Awards: Distinguished Conduct Star
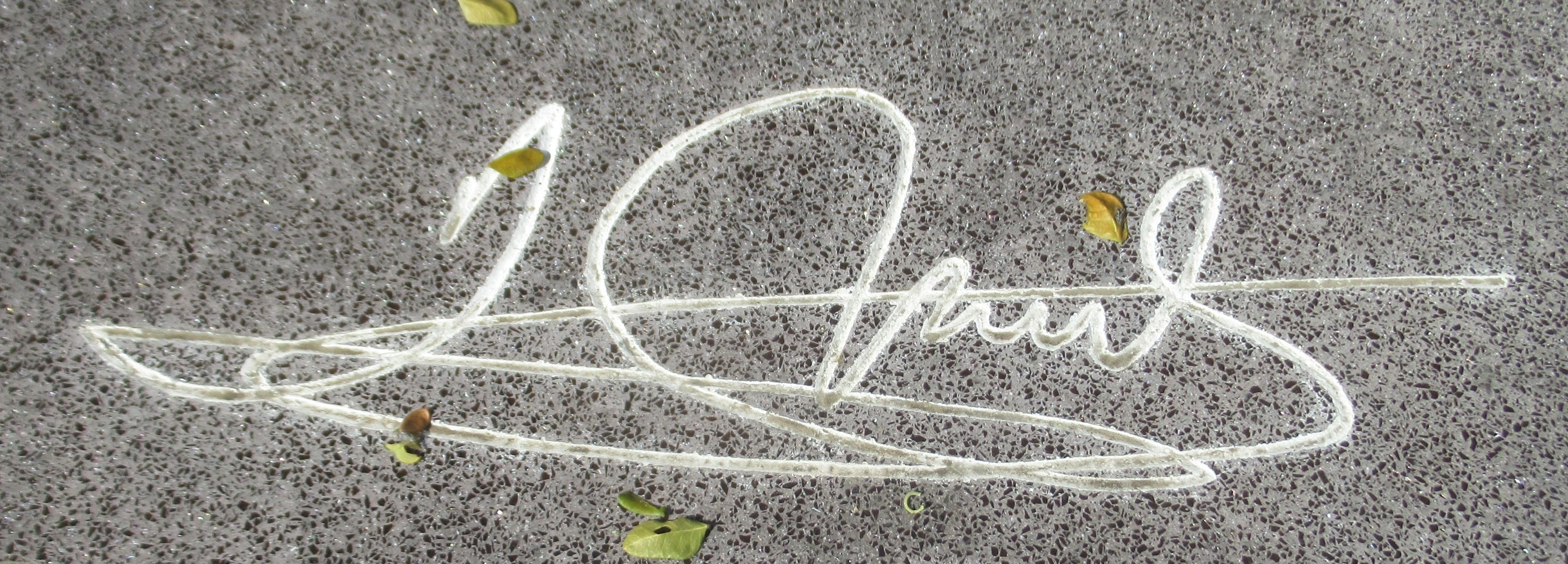
- Signature

Military service
- Allegiance: Philippines
- Branch/service: Philippine Army
- Years of service: 1944–1946 (USAFFE); 1946–1981 (Army)
- Rank: Major General
- Commands: 3rd Infantry Division
- Battles/wars: World War II; Philippines Campaign (1944–1945); Hukbalahap Campaign; Korean War; Moro Conflict

Fortunato Ubongen Abat KCM (June 10, 1925 – March 7, 2018) was a Filipino major general who served as the 20th Secretary of the Department of National Defense (DND), Ambassador to the People's Republic of China, and Commanding General of the Philippine Army.

== Early life ==
Fortunato Abat was born on 10 June 1925 in San Juan, La Union to Epifanio Abat and Esperanza Ubongen. He studied in Singalong Elementary School in the city of Manila from 1932 to 1939, then in Araullo High School from 1939 to 1941. His secondary education was abruptly halted by the Japanese invasion during World War II. As a young teenager, he entered the Philippine Army which was incorporated into the United States Armed Forces in the Far East (USAFFE) as an enlisted man on April 15, 1944, before the Allied Liberation of the Philippines. He continued his secondary education in La Union High School after the war and graduated in 1947.

== Military ==
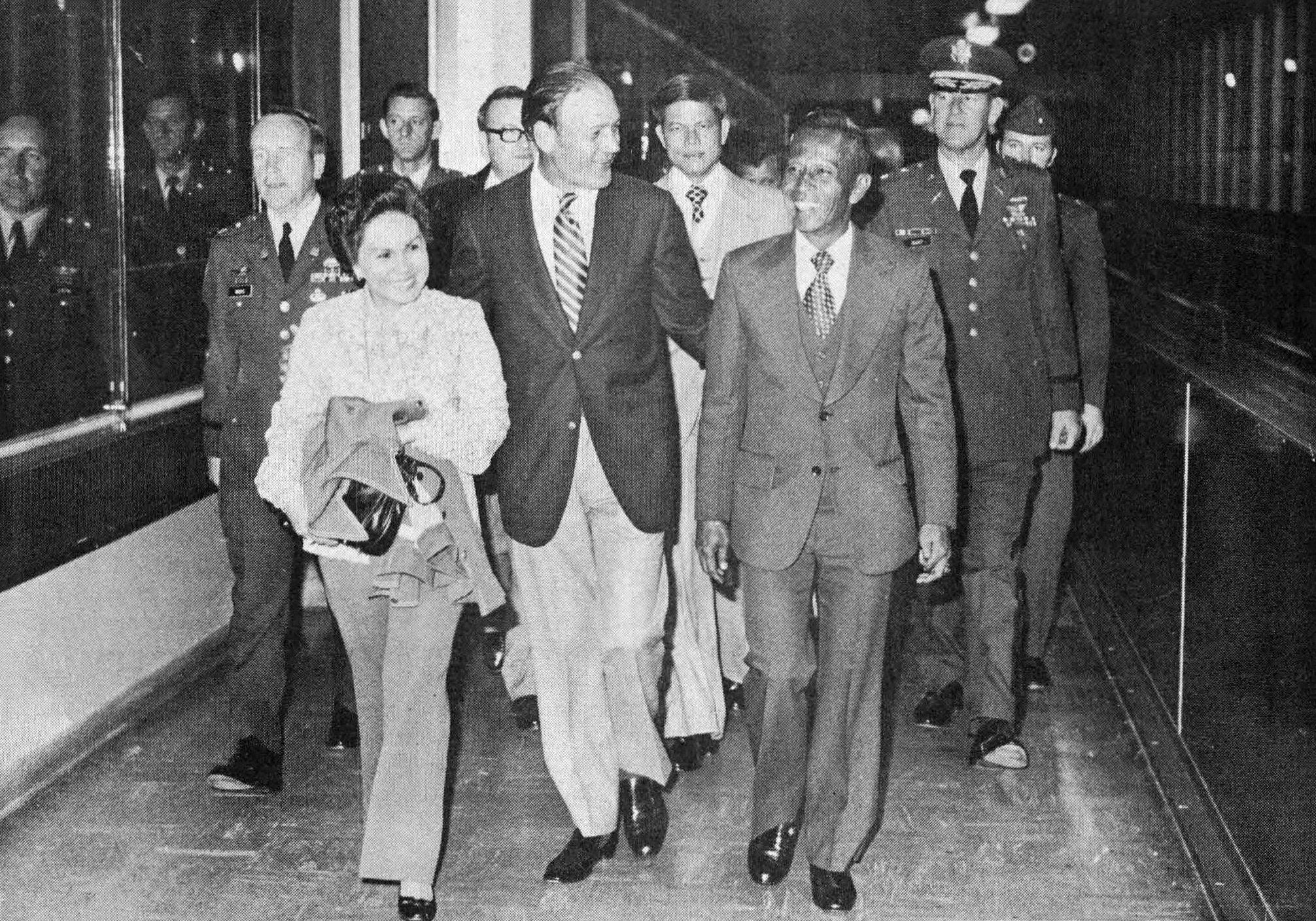
Abat (right) and his wife (left) in 1978

Abat entered the Philippine Military Academy right after finishing his high school diploma, and graduated in the Class of '51, and was commissioned as 2nd Lieutenant in the Philippine Army. Along with 2nd Lieutenant Fidel V. Ramos, Abat joined the Philippine Expeditionary Forces to Korea (PEFTOK), where he served with distinction under the United Nations flag.

Abat's became the Assistant Chief of Staff for Operations & Training of the 1st Infantry (Tabak) Division. Later on he became the Senior Armed Forces Attache at the Philippine Embassy in Phnom Penh, Cambodia. He also was sent with the Philippine Delegation to the 1st, 2nd, 3rd, 4th, and 5th Meetings of the SEATO Intelligence Assessment Committee in Bangkok, Thailand.

He also distinguished himself as Commanding Officer of the 3rd Infantry Brigade (Separate), and later on as the Commanding General of the 3rd Infantry Division, and Central Mindanao Command (CEMCOM).

Maj. Gen. Abat finally served as Commanding General of the Philippine Army from March 28, 1976, to March 28, 1981. During that time, his son, 2Lt. Tito B. Abat, was killed in an encounter with the New People's Army in Eastern Samar, a year after graduating from the Philippine Military Academy.

Immediately after his retirement from the military, he joined the Ministry of Human Settlements. A few months later, he was named Ambassador to the People’s Republic of China where he served from May 1981 until after the EDSA Revolution in April 1986.

Upon his return from China, Abat was first appointed as the Administrator of the Philippine Veterans Affairs Office (PVAO), a DND agency. Later on, he was named Undersecretary of National Defense (USND) during the term of Secretary Rafael Ileto. He also served as Undersecretary during the term of then-Secretary Fidel V. Ramos, but he left the department and was designated Deputy Director General to Ileto who later headed the National Security Council (NSC).

During the presidency of Fidel Ramos, Abat was the Chairman of the Peace Panel of the Philippine Government during the negotiations with the Moro National Liberation Front (MNLF), which led to signing of a peace treaty on July 18, 1997, ending the three decade old armed hostilities between the Republic of the Philippines and the group. He also served as the 20th Secretary of the Department of National Defense from September 16, 1997, to June 30, 1998.

During the height of the impeachment trial of President Joseph Estrada, Abat along with his colleagues in the Association of General and Flag Officers (AGFO) called for the resignation of the President through a Manifesto.

Abat finally was appointed as the President & CEO of the John Hay Poro Point Development Corp. by Pres. Gloria Macapagal Arroyo.

== Later life ==
Despite retirement, Abat continued to play a role in Philippine politics, without escaping controversy. Abat, who formed the National Coalition for Solidarity (NCS) and the Movement for National Salvation (MVS) later called President Arroyo to resign after she was implicated in a series of scandals.

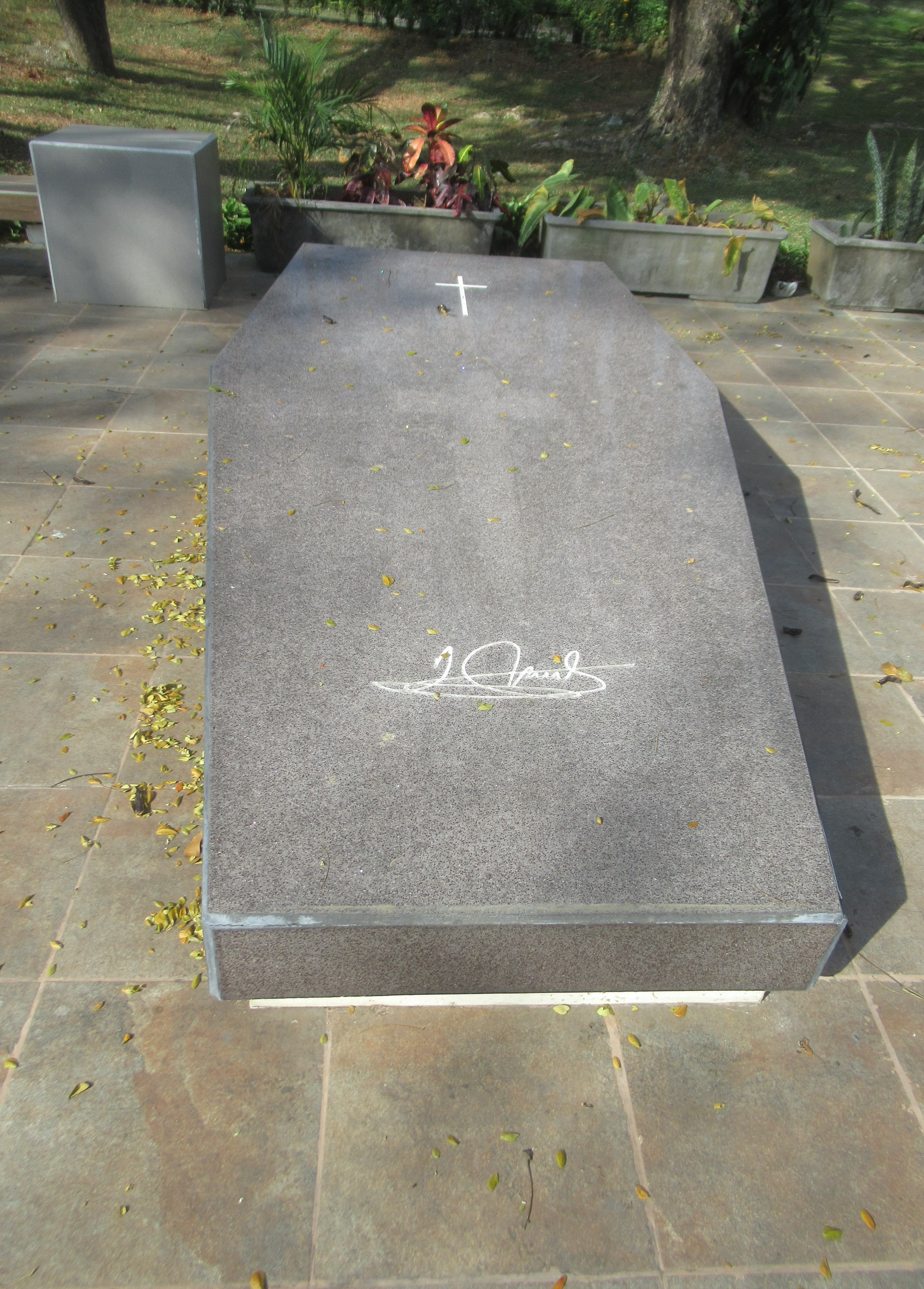
Abat's grave at the Libingan ng mga Bayani.

In December 2005, Abat was arrested after he called on the formation of a revolutionary government, of which he is the new President of the Philippines, and called on the resignation of President Arroyo over allegations of corruption.

On August 15, 2006, Abat called for the abolition of the Philippine Government and the Philippine Constitution, and the creation of a "Transition Government" of "Discipline and Authoritative Governance" where "All the three (3) branches of government are collectively responsible and accountable to the President that has oversight power over the discharge of their functions and responsibilities. Focus of governance. Governance is focused on the civil service and the military and police service."

Abat served as the Chairman of the Military Service Board under Arroyo's successor, President Benigno Aquino III.

== Death ==
Abat died at the Veterans Memorial Medical Center in Quezon City on 7 March 2018, aged 92. He was interred in the Libingan ng mga Bayani.

== Awards and distinctions ==
- Distinguished Conduct Star
- Distinguished Service Star (3)
- Presidential Golden Heart Award
- Commander of the Philippine Legion of Honor
- Outstanding Achievement Medal
- Philippine Liberation Medal
- Philippine Republic Presidential Unit Citation
- Military Merit Medal
- Long Service Medal
- Korean Service Medal
- Anti-Dissidence Campaign Medal
- Luzon Anti-Dissidence Campaign Medal
- Mindanao Anti-Dissidence Campaign Medal
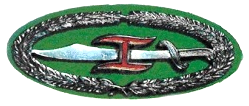
- Combat Commander's (Kagitingan) Badge
- United Nations Service Medal
- Commander of the Royal Order of Monisaraphon (Cambodia)
- Kartika Eksa Paksi Medal & Sword of Indonesia (Degree of Cmdr)
- Cheon-Su Medal of the Order of National Security Merit (Korea)
- Presidential Unit Citation (Korea)
- Knight Grand Cross (First Class) of the Most Noble Order of the Crown of Thailand
- Commander of the Legion of Merit (United States)
- US Congressional Gold Medal for Filipino Veterans of World War II (posthumous; 2022)

== See also ==
- Armed Forces of the Philippines
- Chief of the Philippine Army
- Philippine Army

Military offices
Preceded by Rafael Zagala	Commanding General of the Philippine Army; 1976–1981	Succeeded by Josephus Ramas
Political offices
Preceded by Renato de Villa	Secretary of National Defense; 1997–1998	Succeeded by Orlando S. Mercado
