= Chief of the Army (Philippines) =

Commanding General of the Philippine Army
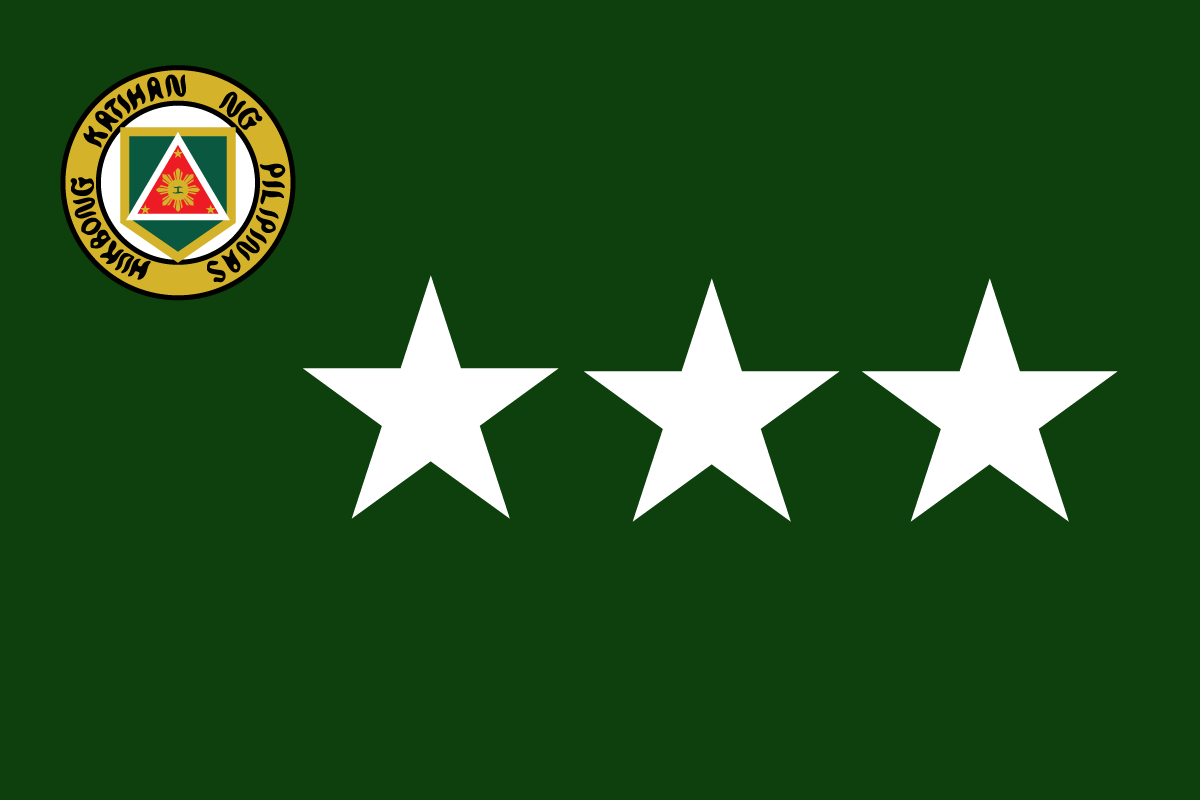
- Flag of the Commanding General of the Philippine Army
- Incumbent; LtGen. Donald Gumiran since July 21, 2026
- Philippine Army
- Abbreviation: CGPA
- Reports to: Chief of Staff of the Armed Forces of the Philippines
- Residence: Fort Andres Bonifacio, Taguig City
- Seat: Fort Andres Bonifacio, Taguig City
- Appointer: The president; with Commission on Appointments confirmation
- Term length: 2 years
- Constituting instrument: Republic Act No. 11939
- Precursor: Commanding General of the Philippine Revolutionary Army
- Formation: 11 January 1936
- Deputy: Vice Commander of the Philippine Army; Chief of Staff of the Philippine Army

The Commanding General of the Philippine Army (CGPA) is the overall commander and highest ranking officer commissioned to serve in the Philippine Army. The position concurrently holds the three-star rank of lieutenant general.

The commanding general is appointed by the president of the Philippines and confirmed by the Commission on Appointments. In the military chain of command, the CGPA directly reports to the Chief of Staff of the Armed Forces of the Philippines.

== Powers and responsibilities ==
The Commanding General serves as the overall head of the Philippine Army, where he/she has full operational control and command of the army. Unlike its US-based counterpart, the chief of staff of the U.S. Army, the CGPA has direct command oversight of the army's activities, army operations, and administrative functions to all army units, down from the army's enlisted personnel, and up to the army's different commands and divisions under its branch. The CGPA directly reports all operations and functions to the chief of staff of the Armed Forces and serves as the primary advisor for the secretary of national defense in army related matters, which will also be transmitted to the president of the Philippines, who serves as the commander-in-chief of the Armed Forces of the Philippines. The CGPA is also responsible for the army's resource management and strategic planning thrusts aimed at ensuring that the army can respond in addressing the command's needs, from programs such as the Army's modernization programs, doctrine development, research & development-related objectives, and addressing the professional and welfare programs of the command. The CGPA is also in managing humanitarian assistance operations in times of calamities and also holds international collaboration efforts to other armies in the region, which fosters both inter-army relations and potential partnerships in future military exercises.

== Organization and term limit ==
The CGPA is directly assisted by two deputies, namely the Vice-Commander of the Philippine Army, who serves as the CGPA's immediate assistant in implementing the army's thrusts and operations, and the Chief of Staff of the Philippine Army. The Vice-Commander also has the power to assist the CGPA in their absence, while the Chief of Staff serves as the overall head of the Army's organizational staff, ensuring that the Army's thrusts is properly implemented and is responsible in managing the Army's administrative commands, general staff commands, and offices.

The CGPA is directly appointed by the President of the Philippines, who also has the power to end the fixed term of the CGPA at their pleasure, and needs the consent and approval of the Commission on Appointments for briefing and confirmation of their post. The CGPA's fixed-term length lasts two years, under the provisions of Republic Act No. 11939, and can only be extended in times of war and national emergencies with the approval of Congress.

== Officeholders ==
=== Captain General of the Revolutionary Army ===
No.	Portrait	Name	Term			President	Ref.
No.	Portrait	Name	Took office	Left office	Duration	President	Ref.
1	Artemio Ricarte y García	Captain General; Artemio Ricarte y García (1866–1945)	22 March 1897	22 January 1899	1 year, 306 days	Emilio Aguinaldo	

=== Commanding General of the Republican Army ===
No.	Portrait	Name	Term			President	Ref.
No.	Portrait	Name	Took office	Left office	Duration	President	Ref.
2	Antonio Luna y Novicio	Lieutenant General; Antonio Luna y Novicio (1866–1899)	23 January 1899	5 June 1899 †	133 days	Emilio Aguinaldo	
—	Emilio Aguinaldo y Famy	General; Emilio Aguinaldo y Famy (1869–1964); Acting	5 June 1899	1 April 1901	146 days	Himself	—

=== Chief of Staff of the Philippine Army ===
No.	Portrait	Name	Term			President	Ref.
No.	Portrait	Name	Took office	Left office	Duration	President	Ref.
3	Jose de los Reyes	Major General; Jose de los Reyes (1874–1945)	11 January 1936	3 May 1936	113 days	Manuel Quezon	
4	Paulino Santos	Major General; Paulino Santos (1890–1945)	6 May 1936	31 December 1938	2 years, 239 days	Manuel Quezon	
5	Basilio Valdés	Major General; Basilio Valdés (1892–1970)	1 January 1939	7 November 1945	6 years, 310 days	Manuel Quezon; Sergio Osmeña	
6	Rafael Jalandoni	Major General; Rafael Jalandoni (1894–?)	21 December 1945	10 March 1947	1 year, 79 days	Sergio Osmeña; Manuel Roxas	

=== Chief of Staff of the Armed Forces of the Philippines ===
No.	Portrait	Name	Term			President	Ref.
No.	Portrait	Name	Took office	Left office	Duration	President	Ref.
6	Rafael Jalandoni	Major General; Rafael Jalandoni (1894–?)	10 March 1947	21 December 1948	1 year, 286 days	Manuel Roxas; Elpidio Quirino	
7	Mariano Castañeda	Major General; Mariano Castañeda (1892–1970)	21 December 1948	15 January 1951	2 years, 25 days	Elpidio Quirino	—
8	Calixto Duque	Major General; Calixto Duque (1893–1972)	15 January 1951	29 December 1953	2 years, 348 days	Elpidio Quirino	—
9	Jesus Vargas	Lieutenant General; Jesus Vargas (1905–1994)	30 December 1953	29 December 1956	2 years, 365 days	Ramon Magsaysay	—
10	Alfonso Arellano	Lieutenant General; Alfonso Arellano (1905–1957)	29 December 1956	1 June 1957	154 days	Ramon Magsaysay; Carlos Garcia	—

=== Commanding General of the Philippine Army ===
No.	Portrait	Name	Term			President	Chief of Staff	Ref.
No.	Portrait	Name	Took office	Left office	Duration	President	Chief of Staff	Ref.
11	Leoncio Tan	Brigadier General; Leoncio Tan (1910–1986)	1 July 1957	12 June 1958	346 days	Carlos García	Alfonso Arellano	–
12	Tirso Fajardo	Brigadier General; Tirso Fajardo (1910–1986)	12 June 1958	1 August 1960	2 years, 50 days	Carlos García	Alfonso Arellano; Manuel Cabal	–
13	Alfredo Santos	Brigadier General; Alfredo Santos (1905–1990)	1 August 1960	16 September 1962	2 years, 46 days	Carlos García; Diosdado Macapagal	Manuel Cabal; Pelagio Cruz	–
14	Dominador García	Brigadier General; Dominador García	16 September 1962	1 January 1963	107 days	Diosdado Macapagal	Alfredo Santos	–
15	Ricardo Papa	Brigadier General; Ricardo Papa	1 January 1963	31 August 1963	242 days	Diosdado Macapagal	Alfredo Santos	–
16	Ernesto Mata	Brigadier General; Ernesto Mata (1915–2012)	1 September 1963	1 June 1964	274 days	Diosdado Macapagal	Alfredo Santos	–
17	Rigoberto Atienza	Brigadier General; Rigoberto Atienza	1 June 1964	23 March 1965	295 days	Diosdado Macapagal	Alfredo Santos	–
18	Ismael Lapus	Brigadier General; Ismael Lapus	23 March 1965	28 September 1965	189 days	Diosdado Macapagal	Alfredo Santos; Rigoberto Atienza	–
19	Patricio Monzon	Brigadier General; Patricio Monzon	28 September 1965	1 December 1965	64 days	Diosdado Macapagal	Rigoberto Atienza	–
20	Silvino de Goma	Brigadier General; Silvino de Goma	1 December 1965	25 January 1966	55 days	Diosdado Macapagal; Ferdinand Marcos	Rigoberto Atienza; Ernesto Mata	–
21	Santos García	Brigadier General; Santos García	25 January 1966	13 January 1967	353 days	Ferdinand Marcos	Ernesto Mata	–
22	Romeo Espino	Brigadier General; Romeo Espino (1914–2003)	13 January 1967	29 May 1968	1 year, 137 days	Ferdinand Marcos	Ernesto Mata; Víctor Osias; Segundo Velasco	–
23	Rúben Maglaya	Brigadier General; Rúben Maglaya	29 May 1968	30 June 1969	1 year, 32 days	Ferdinand Marcos	Manuel Yan	–
24	Rafael Ileto	Brigadier General; Rafael Ileto (1920–2003)	30 June 1969	16 January 1972	2 years, 200 days	Ferdinand Marcos	Manuel Yan	–
25	Rafael Zagala	Major General; Rafael Zagala	16 January 1972	16 January 1975	3 years, 0 days	Ferdinand Marcos	Romeo Espino	–
26	Ricardo Sarimos	Major General; Ricardo Sarimos	16 January 1975	27 March 1976	1 year, 71 days	Ferdinand Marcos	Romeo Espino	–
27	Fortunato Abat	Major General; Fortunato Abat (1925–2018)	28 March 1976	27 March 1981	4 years, 364 days	Ferdinand Marcos	Romeo Espino	–
28	Josephus Ramas	Major General; Josephus Ramas (1925–2005)	27 March 1981	28 February 1986	4 years, 338 days	Ferdinand Marcos	Fabian Ver; Fidel Ramos	–
29	Rodolfo Canieso	Major General; Rodolfo Canieso (1932–2016)	28 February 1986	1 July 1987	1 year, 123 days	Corazon Aquino	Fidel Ramos	–
30	Restituto Padilla Sr.	Major General; Restituto Padilla Sr.	1 July 1987	30 March 1988	273 days	Corazon Aquino	Fidel Ramos; Renato de Villa	–
31	Mariano Adalem	Major General; Mariano Adalem (1933–2000)	30 March 1988	26 July 1989	1 year, 118 days	Corazon Aquino	Renato de Villa	–
32	Manuel Cacanando	Major General; Manuel Cacanando	26 July 1989	1 March 1990	218 days	Corazon Aquino	Renato de Villa	–
33	Ricardo P Flores	Major General; Ricardo P Flores (7 July 1940–5 July 2020)	1 March 1990	11 January 1991	316 days	Corazon Aquino	Renato de Villa	–
34	Lisandro Abadia	Major General; Lisandro Abadia	11 January 1991	11 April 1991	90 days	Corazon Aquino	Renato de Villa; Rodolfo Biazon	–
35	Arturo Enrile	Lieutenant General; Arturo Enrile (1940–1998)	11 April 1991	15 April 1994	3 years, 4 days	Corazon Aquino; Fidel Ramos	Lisandro Abadia	–
36	Rómulo Yap	Lieutenant General; Rómulo Yap (1939–2022)	15 April 1994	20 February 1995	311 days	Fidel Ramos	Arturo Enrile	–
37	Orlando Soriano	Lieutenant General; Orlando Soriano	20 February 1995	25 January 1996	339 days	Fidel Ramos	Arturo Enrile	–
38	Clemente Mariano	Lieutenant General; Clemente Mariano	25 January 1996	31 December 1997	1 year, 340 days	Fidel Ramos	Arturo Enrile; Arnulfo Acedera Jr.	–
39	Raul Urgello	Lieutenant general Raul Urgello	31 December 1997	30 September 1998	273 days	Fidel Ramos; Joseph Estrada	Clemente Mariano; Joselin Nazareno	–
40	Angelo Reyes	Lieutenant General; Angelo Reyes (1945–2011)	30 September 1998	3 May 1999	215 days	Joseph Estrada	Joselin Nazareno	–
41	Voltaire Gazmin	Lieutenant General; Voltaire Gazmin (born 1944)	3 May 1999	22 October 2000	1 year, 172 days	Joseph Estrada	Angelo Reyes	–
42	Diomedio Villanueva	Lieutenant General; Diomedio Villanueva (1947–2023)	22 October 2000	17 March 2001	146 days	Joseph Estrada; Gloria Macapagal Arroyo	Angelo Reyes	–
43	Jaime de los Santos	Lieutenant General; Jaime de los Santos (born 1946)	17 March 2001	2 April 2002	1 year, 16 days	Gloria Macapagal Arroyo	Diomedio Villanueva	–
44	Dionisio Santiago	Lieutenant General; Dionisio Santiago (born 1947)	2 April 2002	14 November 2002	226 days	Gloria Macapagal Arroyo	Diomedio Villanueva; Roy Cimatu; Benjamin Defensor Jr.	–
45	Gregorio Camiling Jr.	Lieutenant General; Gregorio Camiling Jr.	14 November 2002	6 January 2003	53 days	Gloria Macapagal Arroyo	Benjamin Defensor Jr. Dionisio Santiago	–
46	Efren Abu	Lieutenant General; Efren Abu	6 January 2003	3 November 2004	1 year, 302 days	Gloria Macapagal Arroyo	Dionisio Santiago; Narciso Abaya	–
47	Generoso Senga	Lieutenant General; Generoso Senga (born 1950)	3 November 2004	17 August 2005	287 days	Gloria Macapagal Arroyo	Efren Abu	–
48	Hermogenes Esperon	Lieutenant General; Hermogenes Esperon (born 1952)	17 August 2005	22 July 2006	339 days	Gloria Macapagal Arroyo	Generoso Senga	–
49	Romeo Tolentino	Lieutenant General; Romeo Tolentino (born 1952)	22 July 2006	24 August 2007	1 year, 33 days	Gloria Macapagal Arroyo	Hermogenes Esperon	–
50	Alexander Yano	Lieutenant General; Alexander Yano (born 1953)	24 August 2007	12 May 2008	262 days	Gloria Macapagal Arroyo	Hermogenes Esperon	
51	Victor Ibrado	Lieutenant General; Victor Ibrado	12 May 2008	4 May 2009	357 days	Gloria Macapagal Arroyo	Alexander Yano	
52	Delfin Bangit	Lieutenant General; Delfin Bangit (1955–2013)	4 May 2009	12 March 2010	312 days	Gloria Macapagal Arroyo	Victor Ibrado	
53	Reynaldo Mapagu	Lieutenant General; Reynaldo Mapagu	12 March 2010	23 July 2010	133 days	Gloria Macapagal Arroyo; Benigno Aquino III	Delfin Bangit; Nestor Ochoa; Ricardo David	
54	Arturo Ortiz	Lieutenant General; Arturo Ortiz (born 1955)	23 July 2010	10 November 2011	1 year, 110 days	Benigno Aquino III	Ricardo David; Eduardo Oban	
55	Emmanuel Bautista	Lieutenant General; Emmanuel Bautista (born 1961)	10 November 2011	22 January 2013	1 year, 73 days	Benigno Aquino III	Eduardo Oban; Jessie Dellosa	
56	Noel Coballes	Lieutenant General; Noel Coballes (born 1958)	22 January 2013	7 February 2014	1 year, 16 days	Benigno Aquino III	Emmanuel Bautista	
57	Hernando Iriberri	Lieutenant General; Hernando Iriberri (born 1961)	7 February 2014	15 July 2015	1 year, 158 days	Benigno Aquino III	Emmanuel Bautista; Gregorio Catapang Jr.	
58	Eduardo Año	Lieutenant General; Eduardo Año (born 1961)	15 July 2015	7 December 2016	1 year, 145 days	Benigno Aquino III; Rodrigo Duterte	Hernando Iriberri; Glorioso Miranda; Ricardo Visaya	
—	Glorioso Miranda	Lieutenant General; Glorioso Miranda (born 1961); Acting	7 December 2016	5 October 2017	302 days	Rodrigo Duterte	Eduardo Año	
59	Rolando Joselito Bautista	Lieutenant General; Rolando Joselito Bautista (born 1962)	5 October 2017	15 October 2018	1 year, 10 days	Rodrigo Duterte	Eduardo Año; Rey Leonardo Guerrero; Carlito Galvez Jr.	
60	Macairog Alberto	Lieutenant General; Macairog Alberto (born 1963)	15 October 2018	6 December 2019	1 year, 52 days	Rodrigo Duterte	Carlito Galvez Jr. Benjamin Madrigal Jr. Noel Clement	
61	Gilbert Gapay	Lieutenant General; Gilbert Gapay (born 1965)	6 December 2019	3 August 2020	241 days	Rodrigo Duterte	Noel Clement; Felimon Santos Jr.	
62	Cirilito Sobejana	Lieutenant General; Cirilito Sobejana (born 1965)	4 August 2020	16 February 2021	197 days	Rodrigo Duterte	Gilbert Gapay	
63	Jose Faustino Jr.	Lieutenant General; Jose Faustino Jr. (born 1965)	16 February 2021	14 May 2021	87 days	Rodrigo Duterte	Cirilito Sobejana	
64	Andres Centino	Lieutenant General; Andres Centino (born 1967)	14 May 2021	10 December 2021	210 days	Rodrigo Duterte	Cirilito Sobejana; Jose Faustino Jr.	
65	Romeo Brawner Jr.	Lieutenant General; Romeo Brawner Jr. (born 1968)	10 December 2021	7 August 2023	1 year, 240 days	Rodrigo Duterte; Bongbong Marcos	Andres Centino; Bartolome Bacarro	
66	Roy M. Galido	Lieutenant General; Roy M. Galido (born 1968)	7 August 2023	31 July 2025	1 year, 358 days	Bongbong Marcos	Romeo Brawner Jr.	
67	Antonio G. Nafarrete	Lieutenant General; Antonio G. Nafarrete (born 1969)	31 July 2025	21 July 2026	355 days	Bongbong Marcos	Romeo Brawner Jr.	–
68	Donald Gumiran	Lieutenant General; Donald Gumiran	21 July 2026		81 days	Bongbong Marcos	Antonio Nafarrete	–

== See also ==
- Armed Forces of the Philippines
- Chief of Staff of the Armed Forces of the Philippines
- Philippine Army
- Commanding General of the Philippine Air Force
- Flag Officer-in-Command of the Philippine Navy
- Chief of Constabulary
