= 7th Infantry Division (Philippines) =

7th Infantry "Kaugnay" Division, Philippine Army
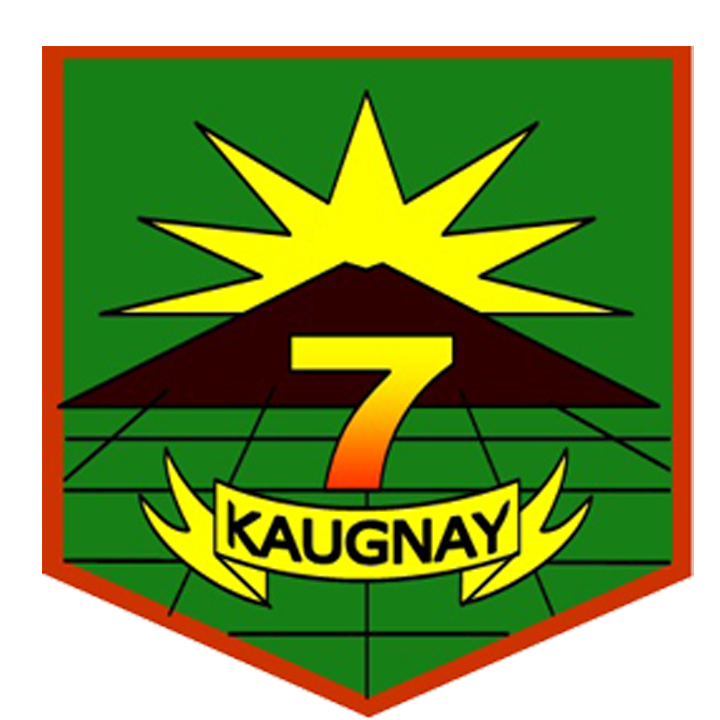
- Coat of Arms of the 7ID
- Active: August 1, 1988 – present
- Country: Philippines
- Branch: Philippine Army
- Type: Infantry
- Role: Conventional Warfare, Anti-Guerrilla Operations
- Size: 2 Brigades
- Part of: Philippine Army (Since 1988)
- Garrison/HQ: Fort Ramon Magsaysay, Nueva Ecija
- Nickname: Kaugnáy Division
- Motto: Kaugnáy
- Mascot: Rice Fields of Central Luzon
- Anniversaries: August 1
- Engagements: Anti-guerrilla operations against the NPA and local criminal elements
- Decorations: Presidential Streamer Award

Commanders
- Current commander: MGen. Allan Jose L. Taguba PA
- Notable commanders: BGen Edgardo Batenga AFP; BGen Marcelo Blando AFP, BGen Orlando V Soriano AFP; BGen Jose Ma. Solquillo AFP; BGen Gregorio Camiling AFP; BGen Julius Javier AFP; MGen Ernesto Carolina AFP; BGen Alberto Braganza AFP; MGen Hermogenes Esperon Jr. AFP; MGen Romeo Tolentino AFP; MGen Jovito Palparan AFP; Gen Gregorio Pio Catapang AFP; Gen Hernando Iriberri AFP; Gen Glorioso Miranda AFP

Insignia
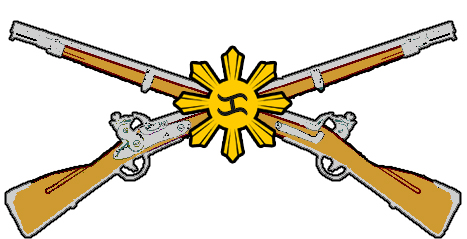
- Armed Forces Occupational Specialty Insignia

The 7th Infantry Division, Philippine Army, known officially as the Kaugnáy Division, is the Philippine Army's primary infantry unit specializing in rapid deployment.

== History ==
The division was originally established on August 1, 1988. During the Communist Insurgency of the Philippines, the local government soldiers and officers under the division were responsible for sending combat operations into:

- Central Luzon, designated as Region III
- Aurora
- Bataan
- Bulacan
- Nueva Ecija
- Pampanga
- Tarlac
- Zambales

These Anti-Communist Operations supported the Armed Forces of the Philippines, Philippine National Police, and the CAFGU militia forces. Their primary opponents were the Communist Party of the Philippines-New People's Army (CPP-NPA), and other local criminal elements.

Its headquarters are currently located at Fort Ramon Magsaysay in Nueva Ecija.

== Mission ==
Their mission is to conduct sustained Internal Security Operations (ISO) in Region III to neutralize the armed wing of the Communist Party of the Philippines (CPP) and the New Peoples Army (NPA). They aim to create a physically and psychologically sound environment conducive for development and commerce.

== Current units ==
The following are the Brigade units that are under the 7th Infantry Division.

- 703rd Infantry Brigade
- 702nd Infantry Brigade

The following are the Battalion units that are under the 7th ID.

- 24th Infantry Battalion
- 48th Infantry Battalion
- 3rd Infantry Battalion
- 56th Infantry Battalion
- 70th Infantry Battalion (Cadre)
- 71st Infantry Battalion
- 81st Infantry (Spartan) Battalion
- 84th Infantry (Victorious) Battalion
- 3rd Mechanized Infantry Battalion
- 71st Division Reconnaissance Company
- 72nd Division Reconnaissance Company
- 73rd Division Reconnaissance Company

== Operations ==
- Internal Security Operations
