= 6th Infantry Division (Philippines) =

Sixth Infantry Division
- Coat of Arms of the 6ID
- Active: October 24, 1987 – present
- Country: Philippines
- Branch: Philippine Army
- Type: Infantry
- Size: 3 Brigades
- Part of: Under the Philippine Army (Since 1987)
- Garrison/HQ: Camp BGen Gonzalo H. Siongco, Awang, Datu Odin Sinsuat, Maguindanao del Norte
- Nickname: Kampilan Division
- Motto: Kampilan
- Mascot: Kampilan
- Anniversaries: October 24
- Engagements: Communist and Islamic Insurgency in the Philippines; Operation Enduring Freedom - Philippines; Anti-guerilla operations against the NPA, MILF, ASG

Commanders
- Current commander: BGen Edgar L Catu, PA
- Notable commanders: BGen Gonzalo Siongco AFP; BGen Rodolfo Garcia AFP; MGen Raul Urgello PA; MGen Gregorio Camiling AFP; BGen Roy Kyamko AFP; MGen Generoso Senga AFP

Insignia
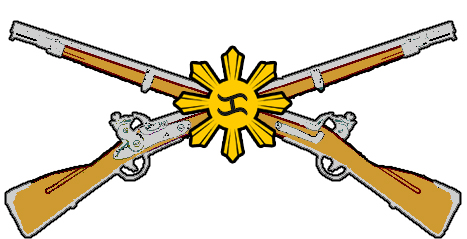
- Armed Forces Occupational Specialty Insignia

The 6th Infantry Division is an infantry division of the Philippine Army. Popularly known as the Kampilan Division, it is one of the Philippine Army's infantry units in Central Mindanao.

== History ==
The division was established on October 24, 1987, by the Armed Forces of the Philippines, with Brig. General Gonzalo H. Siongco as the first Commanding General assigned in its headquarters in Awang, Datu Odin Sinsuat, Maguindanao del Norte.

== Current Units ==
The following are the Brigades under the 6th Infantry Division:

- 601st Infantry "Unifier" Brigade - Ampatuan, Maguindanao Del Sur
- 602nd Infantry "Liberator" Brigade - Camp Lucero, Carmen, Cotabato
- 603rd Infantry "Persuader" Brigade - Lebak, Sultan Kudarat

The following are the Battalions under the 6th Infantry Division:

- 6th Infantry Battalion
- 7th Infantry "Tapat" Battalion
- 33rd Infantry "Makabayan" Battalion
- 37th Infantry "Conqueror" Battalion
- 40th Infantry "Magiting" Battalion
- 57th Infantry "Masikap" Battalion
- 90th Infantry Battalion
- 105th Infantry "Saifullah" Battalion
- 64th Division Reconnaissance Company
- 6th Field Artillery Battalion

The following units are the OPCON under the 6th Infantry Division:

- 1 Mechanized “Lakan” Infantry Battalion
- 5 Special Forces Battalion

The following are the support units under the 6th Infantry Division:

- 6th Signal Battalion
- 6th CMO Battalion
- Service Support Battalion
- 6th Division Training School
- 6th Division Training Unit

== Operations ==
- Anti-guerrilla operations against the New People's Army, and MILF.
- Counter-terrorism operations against the ASG and the JI.
- Operation Darkhorse
