= Allen T. Paredes =

Filipino General

Allen T. Paredes LLH
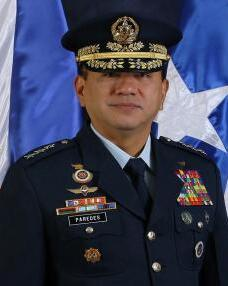
- Lieutenant General Allen T. Paredes in 2020
- Born: December 7, 1965 (age 60); Philippines
- Education: Philippine Military Academy; National Defense College of the Philippines (MNSA); Development Academy of the Philippines (MD & P) University of the Philippines Diliman (MPM)
- Military career
- Allegiance: Philippines
- Branch: Philippine Air Force
- Service years: 1988 - 2021
- Rank: Lieutenant general
- Service number: O-9850
- Units: Chief of the Air Force; Air Logistics Command; Chief of the Air Force Staff; 250th Presidential Airlift Wing; Tactical Operations Group 10; 20th Attack Squadron; 410th Maintenance Wing; 420th Supply Wing; Air Force Research & Development Center
- Conflicts: Islamic insurgency in the Philippines; Communist rebellion in the Philippines; Battle of Marawi
- Awards: Legionnaire, Philippine Legion of Honor; Distinguished Service Star; Gold Cross Medal; Outstanding Achievement Medal; Bronze Cross Medal; Military Merit Medal

Lieutenant General Allen Trio Paredes is a Filipino general who served as the incumbent Chief of the Air Force, replacing Lieutenant General Rozzano D. Briguez. Prior to his post, he served as the former commander of the Air Logistics Command and the 250th Presidential Airlift Wing.

== Early life and education ==
Paredes finished schooling at the Victoria School Foundation in Marikina in 1982 before attending the Philippine Military Academy (PMA) in 1984 and graduated as a member of the PMA's "Maringal" Class of 1988. He attended various courses locally and abroad, such as courses in the Armed Forces of the Philippines Command and General Staff College and earned his Masters in National Security Administration (MNSA) at the National Defense College of the Philippines (NDCP), Class 48. where he finished as Class Valedictorian and Thesis Gold Medalist. He underwent military pilot training at the Philippine Air Force School in Basilio Fernando Air Base in Lipa, Batangas after graduating and completed the training course in 1990, where he received the McMicking Award for his piloting performance.

Paredes also became a Senior Executive Fellow at Harvard University and was a Thesis Gold Medalist for his theses at Development Academy of the Philippines, where he earned his Master in Development & Security. He also earned his Master in Public Management at the University of the Philippines Diliman and completed the comptrollership course and Intelligence courses in the AFP.

== Military career ==
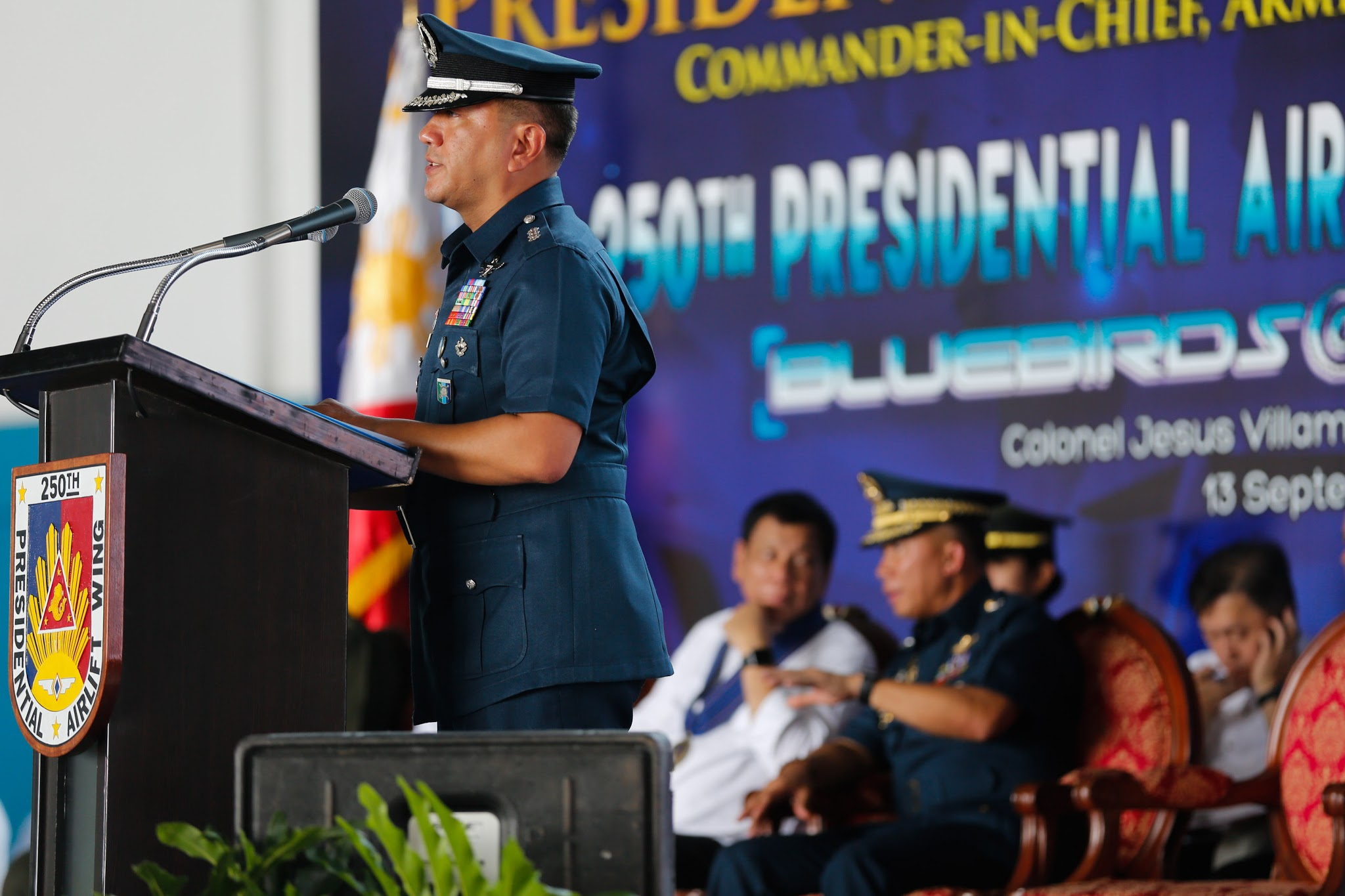
Then-Colonel Paredes giving a welcoming remarks speech during the anniversary of the 250th Presidential Airlift Wing

After graduating from the PMA in 1988 and finishing his military pilot training in 1990. He started his junior days as a lieutenant as a seasoned attack pilot in the 18th Attack Squadron under the 15th Strike Wing flying the McDonnell Douglas MD 520MG Defender light attack helicopters, conducting air support operations in Mindanao. Paredes flew a total of 76 combat missions and afterwards received the Top Gun Award as an expert for Aerial Rocketry. Since then, Paredes was primarily assigned on helicopters, logistics, research and development, maintenance, and safety missions and positions, where he served as the Assistant Chief of Staff for Personnel, A-1; Assistant Chief of Staff for Logistics, OA-4; and became commander of the Air Force Research & Development Center, the 410th Maintenance Wing and the 420th Supply Wing, both headquartered at Clark Air Base in Pampanga. Paredes also served as commander of the 20th Attack Squadron of the 15th Strike Wing, utilizing the McDonnell Douglas MD 520MG Defenders as the squadron's 11th commander.

Paredes also served as the commander of the Tactical Operations Group 10, based in Cagayan de Oro. During his time as a colonel, he was also part of a special committee during the Death of Jesse Robredo in 2012, where he served as the Air Force representative during the investigation. Paredes also served as Deputy Wing Commander of the 250th Presidential Airlift Wing and as the Director of Air Force Safety Office. He earned his first star and was promoted to brigadier general in 2016, as he commanded the 250th Presidential Airlift Wing, from February 2016 to July 2018, where he flew both President Benigno Aquino III and Rodrigo Duterte. Paredes also flew then-President Rodrigo Duterte to the ground zero of Marawi City during the Battle of Marawi.

Paredes later earned his second star and was promoted to major general in 2018, as he served as the Chief of the Air Force Staff, the third highest post in the PAF from July to December 2018, and served as commander of the Air Logistics Command in December 2018 to January 2020, where he command all logistical units of the Air Force, and led the implementation of the Petroleum, Oil and Lubricants program and the Firepower and Munition Info Systems. Paredes was appointed as the new Chief of the Air Force on January 16, 2020, and earned his third star as a lieutenant general in March 2020. As the PAF Chief, he vowed to be a "father figure" of the air force during his tenure, and formulated a new leadership command framework: "Take the Lead, Soar as One", guided by the values of "Diwa, Galing, and Malasakit” (Responsiveness, Excellence and Devotion), and laid out the InSTEP (Integrity, Service, Team, Excellence, and Professionalism) initiative. He also pushed for the PAF's modernization through the procurement of additional aircraft in the air force, such as 32 additional units of the Sikorsky S-70i helicopters, the TAI/AgustaWestland T129 ATAK attack helicopters, the C-130J Super Hercules, and the KAI KT-1 Woongbi. He also led the overall air force operations and assistance despite the effects of the COVID-19 pandemic in the country. Paredes also enhanced the PAF's maintenance funds and facilities and led the PAF to assist 80 TIKAS projects, which was followed by the implementation of the Safety Management System, which replaced the 1960s-based Safety Program, and led the establishment of the Aviation Leadership and Excellence Nexus and Civilian Human Resource School. Paredes also commissioned a total of 33 new aircraft, and added 3,845 new air force personnel.

Paredes retired from the military service on December 7, 2021, upon reaching the mandatory military retirement age of 56 and he was replaced by them-Major General Connor Anthony Canlas Sr.

== Awards in military service ==
Left Side:

Badges	Philippine Air Force Gold Wings Badge		
1st row		Commander, Philippine Legion of Honor	
2nd row	Legionnaire, Philippine Legion of Honor	1 Outstanding Achievement Medal	Distinguished Service Stars with one bronze anahaw cluster
3rd row	Gold Cross Medals with one bronze anahaw cluster	Distinguished Aviation Cross	1 Meritorious Achievement Medal
4th row	1 Distinguished Service Medal	1 Chief of Staff of the AFP Commendation Medal	1 Gawad sa Kaunlaran
5th row	Bronze Cross Medals with our bronze anahaw clusters	Unknown Medal with one bronze anahaw cluster	Silver Wing Medal with two bronze anahaw clusters
6th row	Military Merit Medals with four spearhead devices	Military Merit Medals with three bronze anahaws	Unknown Medal
7th row	1 Sagisag ng Ulirang Kawal	Military Civic Action Medals with three bronze anahaws	Parangal sa Kapanalig ng Sandatahang Lakas ng Pilipinas Medal with one bronze anahaw cluster
8th row	Military Commendation Medals with two silver triangular devices	Unknown Medal	Long Service Medal with two campaign stars
9th row	Anti-dissidence Campaign Medal with two campaign stars	Luzon Anti-Dissidence Campaign Medal with two campaign stars	Visayas Anti-Dissidence Campaign Medal
10th row	Mindanao Anti-Dissidence Campaign Medal	Disaster Relief and Rehabilitation Operations Ribbon with one campaign star	Unknown Medal

Right Side:

Badges	Presidential Flight Crew Badge; Philippine Air Force Senior Pilot Badge		
1st row	Philippine Republic Presidential Unit Citation	Presidential Streamer Award	
2nd row	People Power I Unit Citation	People Power II Unit Citation	Martial Law Unit Citation

Badges and Other Awards:

- National Defense College of the Philippines Badge
- AFP Logistics Eligibility Badge
- Philippine Air Force Flight Plan 2028 Badge

== Personal life ==
He is the son of retired Brigadier General Raymundo Paredes and Mrs Emmanuela Paredes. He is married to Jewel L. Paredes, and they have one daughter.
