= Stephen Parreño =

Filipino Air Force General

Stephen P. Parreño
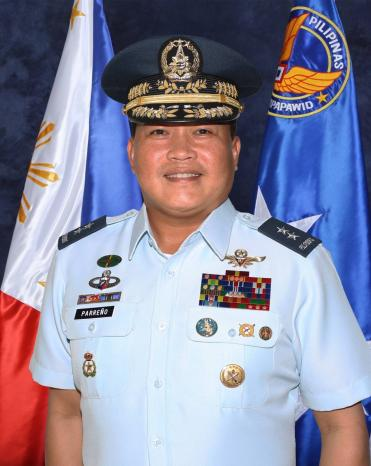
- Then-Major General Stephen P. Parreño as Chief of Air Staff in 2022
- Born: 12 December 1969 (age 56); Passi, Iloilo, Philippines
- Alma mater: Philippine Military Academy (B.S); Asian Institute of Management (MBM); University of New South Wales (M.S); Development Academy of the Philippines (MPM)
- Military career
- Allegiance: Philippines
- Branch: Philippine Air Force
- Service years: 1991–2024
- Rank: Lieutenant general
- Nicknames: "Steph", "Axe"
- Service number: O-10486
- Units: Commanding General of the Philippine Air Force; Acting Vice Commander, Philippine Air Force; Chief of Air Staff; Air Force Inspector General; 220th Airlift Wing; Air Force Special Services Group; Tactical Operations Group 3 Air Force Management and Financial Office; 102nd Basic Pilot Training Squadron; 101st Primary Pilot Training Squadron
- Conflicts: Islamic insurgency in the Philippines; Communist rebellion in the Philippines; Siege of Marawi
- Awards: Commander, Philippine Legion of Honor; Outstanding Achievement Medal; Distinguished Service Star; Bronze Cross Medal; Silver Wing Medal; Military Merit Medal

Stephen Palomado Parreño is a Philippine Air Force officer who served as the Commanding General of the Philippine Air Force since 20 December 2022 until his retirement in 19 December 2024, who holds the rank of Lieutenant General. Prior to his appointment, Parreño as the Acting Vice Commander of the Philippine Air Force, Chief of Air Staff, Group Commander of the Tactical Operations Group 3, and Wing Commander of the 220th Airlift Wing.

== Early life and education ==
Parreño was born on 12 December 1969 in Passi City, Iloilo to a middle-class family. His father, Rolando, was a farmer while his mother, Teresita, is a public school teacher. Parreño enrolled in Central Philippine University (CPU) throughout his school life where he finished kindergarten in 1976, elementary in 1982, and high school in 1986. He also spent a year in the Central Philippine University – College of Engineering studying engineering for one year before entering the Philippine Military Academy.

Parreño entered the Philippine Military Academy (PMA) in 1987 and graduated as part of the PMA "Sambisig" Class of 1991, where he finished as class salutatorian and was earned top 3 of his class, and received the Chief of Staff Saber Award. He was also the lone "Starman" of his class, which is a term used in cadets who earned both Dean's Lister award and the Commandant's Lister award, which also earns his place in the Superintendent's List. He also graduated top 3 at the Philippine Air Force Flying School Class of 1993 in Basilio Fernando Air Base at Lipa, Batangas.

Parreño also holds a Master of Science in Management at the University of New South Wales, a Masters in Public Management at the Development Academy of the Philippines, and a Master of Business and Management at the Asian Institute of Management in Makati, where he graduated as part of the top 10 of his class, and is one of the few noted PAF officers who completed the Curso de Estado Mayor (General Staff Course) at Escuela Superior de las Fuerzas Armadas in Madrid, Spain.

== Career ==
After completing his flight school in 1993, Parreño served as a flight instructor pilot where he flew the Cessna T-41 Mescalero, the SIAI-Marchetti SF.260, and the SIAI-Marchetti SF.260 TP under the PAF Flying School. In the later years, he also flew the SIAI-Marchetti AS-211 Warrior trainer jets/light attack aircraft. He also served as a test pilot and command flight examiner under the Air Education, Training, and Doctrine Command, before being named as a command pilot flying the GAF Nomad. He has logged a total of over 2,500 flight hours, which includes 450 maritime patrol missions, where he primarily served as an airlifts pilot flying the Lockheed C-130 Hercules

Parreño eventually became squadron commander of the two primary flying squadrons of the PAF, the 101st Primary Pilot Training Squadron and the 102nd Basic Pilot Training Squadron. He also became the chief of the Air Force Management and Financial Office before being named as the commander of the Tactical Operations Group 3, based under the command of the Tactical Operations Wing Northern Luzon of the AFP Northern Luzon Command. He also served as the commander of the Air Force Special Services Group. In July 2017, Parreño became the youngest AFP officer to earn his first star at the age of 48 and was promoted to the rank of brigadier general as he was named as the commander of the 220th Airlift Wing.

During his stint as commander of the 220th Airlift Wing, he became renowned for spearheading all airlift operations of the PAF and the AFP throughout the Siege of Marawi, which led the delivery and deployment of various units, vehicles, and supplies throughout the entire battle. His missions also included transport operations from Guam and Arizona, as part of the US support operations during the 5-month long battle.

After his stint as Wing Commander of the 220th Airlift Wing, Parreño was also named as the deputy commander of the Air Mobility Command and as the deputy commander of Air Logistics Command. Parreño was later promoted to the rank of major general in 2021, becoming the youngest officer to earn the rank at the age of 52, as he was named as the Air Force Inspector General.

Parreño was also named as Chief of Air Staff and after a few months, on November 24, 2022 he was named as Acting Vice Commander of the PAF, succeeding Then-Major General Arthur V. Cordura, who was named as the Vice-Chief of Staff of the Armed Forces of the Philippines. Three weeks later, Parreño was named by President Bongbong Marcos as the new Commanding General of the Philippine Air Force, following the retirement of Lieutenant General Connor Anthony Canlas Sr. During his assumption speech, Parreño vowed to sustain his predecessor's efforts under the "LIPAD PAF" Command Thrust, as well as the PAF Modernization Program through the acquisition of new modern assets, and to be a “genuine leader” to all units. He also created his leadership thrust named "AXEL PAF", with a motto "Accelerate PAF with Excellence". He was promoted to the rank of Lieutenant General on January 24, 2023. During the 76th anniversary of the PAF, Parreño emphasized the importance of the PAF to "improve the capability, credibility and sustainability" towards their future goals. Throughout his term, Parreño also pushed for modernizing the air force's strategy and doctrines against external threats, as well as led the implementation of intensified operations, such as the air force's campaign against human trafficking, where he rescued a total of 320 trafficked individuals, and for launching a total of 119 intelligence, surveillance, and reconnaissance (ISR) missions. Parreño also oversaw the delivery of various assets in the air force, such as the delivery of two TAI/AgustaWestland T129 ATAK attack helicopters, a EADS CASA C-295M medium transport plane, ten S-70A-5/i, three Mitsubishi Electric J/FPS-3ME fixed radars, a Mitsubishi Electric J/TPS-P14ME mobile radar, and other land-based assets for various missions.

Parreño retired from military service on 19 December 2024, after finishing his two-year term and was replaced by then-AFP Vice Chief of Staff Lieutenant General Arthur Cordura.

== Awards from Military Service ==
- - Commander, Philippine Legion of Honor
- - Commander, Philippine Legion of Honor (awarded on 19 December 2024 for his stint as Commanding General of the Philippine Air Force)
- - 2 Outstanding Achievement Medal
- - 5 Distinguished Service Star Medals
- - 11 Meritorious Achievement Medals
- - 3 Distinguished Service Medals
- 1 Chief of Staff of the AFP Commendation Medal
- 2 Gawad sa Kaunlaran medals
- 1 Bronze Cross Medal
- 4 Silver Wing Medals
- Military Merit Medals (with one golden anahaw and three silver anahaws, 39 total medals)
- 1 Sagisag ng Ulirang Kawal medal
- 5 Military Civic Action Medals
- 3 Parangal sa Kapanalig ng Sandatahang Lakas ng Pilipinas Medals
- 11 Military Commendation Medals
- Presidential Security Service Ribbon
- 4 AFP Long Service Medal (with two campaign stars)
- 4 Anti-dissidence Campaign Medals
- 2 Luzon Anti-dissidence Campaign Medals (with one campaign stars)
- 2 Visayas Anti-Dissidence Campaign Medal
- 2 Mindanao Anti-dissidence Campaign Medal
- 1 Kalayaan Island Group Campaign Medal
- 2 Northern Maritime Frontier Campaign Medals
- Disaster Relief and Rehabilitation Operations Ribbon

=== Unit Decorations ===
- Philippine Republic Presidential Unit Citation
- People Power II Unit Citation
- Martial Law Unit Citation

=== Badges ===
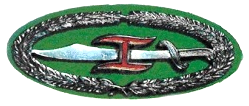
- Combat Commander's Badge
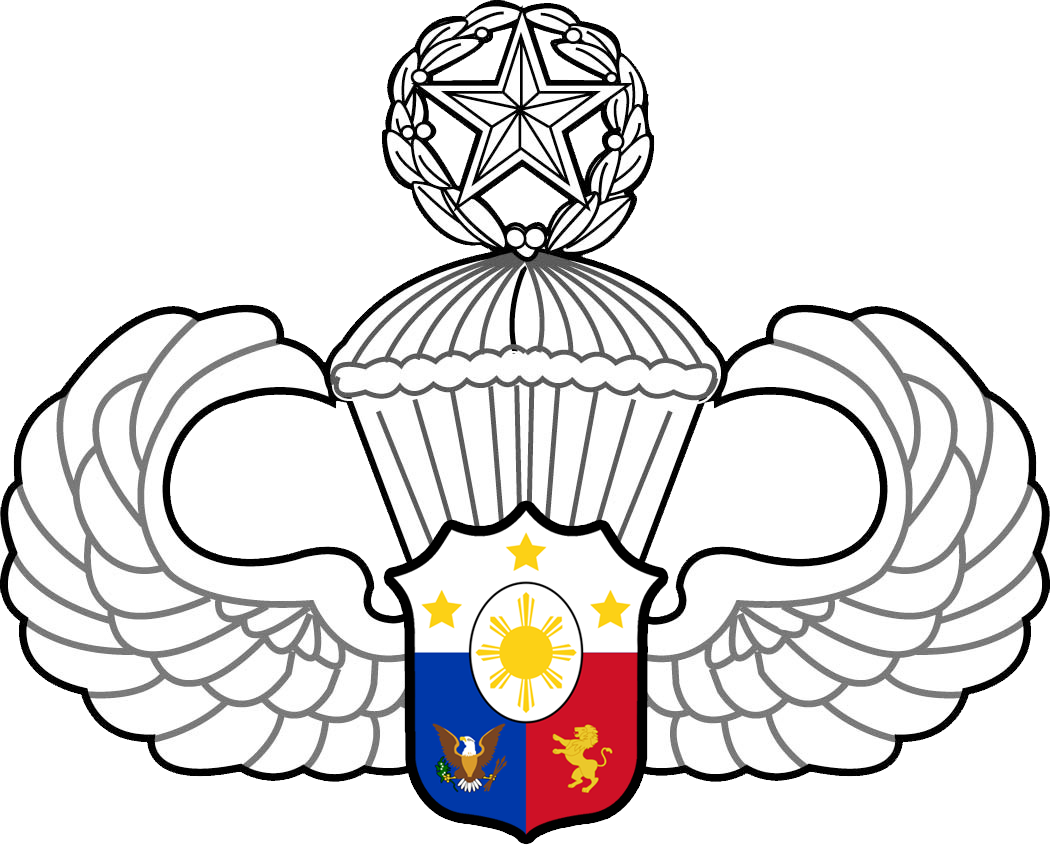
- Master AFP Parachutist Badge
- Philippine Air Force Gold Wings Badge
- PAF Flight Plan 2040 Badge
- Commanding General, Philippine Air Force Badge

== Personal life ==
Parreño is often known by his peers as "Steph" and "Axe". He is married to Agnes Panebe-Parreño and they have three children. His interests include arts, music, and sports, and often does painting during his free time. During his younger years, he served as an officer on the school chapter of the DeMolay International, and also served as member of the CPUDHS Basketball Team, where he earned his nickname as "black Chip Engelland".
