= Rozzano D. Briguez =

Filipino general

36th Commanding General of the Philippine Air Force
- In office 21 December 2018 – 16 January 2020
- President: Rodrigo Duterte
- Preceded by: Lt. Gen. Galileo Gerard R. Kintanar, Jr.
- Succeeded by: Lt. Gen Allen T. Paredes

Personal details
- Born: January 17, 1964 (age 62) Cebu City, Cebu, Philippines
- Education: Philippine Military Academy; Asian Institute of Management (MBM); University of New South Wales (MPM); Air University (United States Air Force) (MSS)

Military service
- Allegiance: Philippines
- Branch/service: Philippine Air Force
- Years of service: 1986–2020
- Rank: Lieutenant general
- Unit: Commanding General of the Philippine Air Force; AFP Western Command; Vice Commander of the Philippine Air Force; Chief of Air Staff; Commandant of Cadets (Philippine Military Academy); Tactical Operations Group 11
- Battles/wars: Moro conflict CPP-NPA-NDF rebellion

Rozzano Dosado Briguez is a Filipino general who formerly served as the Commanding General of the Philippine Air Force. He is a graduate of the Philippine Military Academy "Sinagtala" Class of 1986, and graduated as Top 2 of his class. He was also a commander of the AFP Western Command, and formulated the new command framework: "Padayon PAF: Perform, Reform, Transform", a framework of his leadership philosophy in the Philippine Air Force.

After his retirement from the Philippine Air Force, President Rodrigo Duterte named him the new CEO of the Philippine National Oil Company Exploration Corporation.

== Early life and education ==
Briguez was born in Cebu City on January 17, 1964. His family resides at Sogod, 61 kilometers north of Cebu City. He was a graduate from the Colegio de San Jose-Recoletos, Cebu City, and entered the Philippine Military Academy in 1982 and graduated in 1986. He was the class president and the class baron of Sinagtala Class of 1986 and graduated top 2 of his class. He underwent Military Pilot Training (MPT) (now Air Education, Training and Doctrine Command or AETDC) at the Philippine Air Force School in Basilio Fernando Air Base in Lipa, Batangas. He also took the Aviation Officer Advance Course at the United States Army Aviation Center of Excellence at Fort Rucker, Alabama, the General Staff Course, at the then AFP Command and General Staff Course (now AFP Education, Training, and Doctrine Command or AFPETDCOM), where he graduated as Top 2 of his class. He also holds a master's degrees in Business Management in the Asian Institute of Management, Project Management in University of New South Wales, and in Strategic Studies in the Air University (United States Air Force) in Alabama.

== Military career ==
After undergoing military pilot training at the Philippine Air Force School after completing the training course in 1988, he returned to the Air Force School and joined as a trainer pilot, flying the Cessna T-41D Mescaleros, the SIAI-Marchetti SF.260s and the SIAI-Marchetti AS-211s. He also served at the 220th Airlift Wing, piloting the Air Force's airlift planes, such as the Lockheed C-130 Hercules and the GAF Nomad, in various parts of the country, from troop deployments in Mindanao to disaster response and rehabilitation.

He also held various positions in the PAF, the AFP and the PMA; such as the Commander of Tactical Operations Group 11 of the Tactical Operations Command, based in Davao; Acting Assistant Chief of Air Staff for Plans and Programs, A-5, and as Executive Officer, OA-5. He also served as the Assistant Chief of Air Staff for Education and Training, A-8; Assistant Chief of Air Staff for Operations, A-3; and as Deputy Commander of the 250th Presidential Airlift Wing.

He was named as the Commandant of Cadets at the Philippine Military Academy, and served as the Chief of Air Staff and the Vice Commander of the Philippine Air Force. He was named the commander of the AFP Western Command on November 20, 2017, where he served as the commander of all AFP units at the South China Sea, and monitors the presence of the Chinese and other neighboring ships within the country's exclusive economic zone (EEZ), before being named as the Commanding General of the Philippine Air Force on December 5, 2018.

As the Chief of the Philippine Air Force, he crafted the "Padayon PAF: Perform, Reform, Transform", which serves as a framework of his leadership philosophy during his tenure in the Philippine Air Force. He also spearheaded the air force's modernization programs, such as the acquisition of the Multirole Fighter Acquisition Project (which selected the Lockheed Martin F-16C/D Block 70 Viper over the Saab JAS 39 Gripen C/D MS20 on 2019), the awarding notice of the Mitsubishi Electric J/FPS-3ME and the Mitsubishi Electric J/TPS-P14ME radar systems, the SPYDER air-defense system, 1 new EADS CASA C-295 transport aircraft, 1 additional Lockheed C-130B Hercules transport aircraft, 1 new Gulfstream G280 VIP Aircraft (originally intended as a command and control aircraft), 16 new PZL Mielec S70-i combat utility helicopters, and 6 new Embraer A29B Super Tucano attack aircraft. During his term, plans were also laid out to acquire 6 additional NC-212i Aviocar light transport aircraft. He also led air force operations during the 2020 Taal Volcano Eruption.

He retired from military service on January 16, 2020, and currently serves as a member at the 1st Air Wing Reserve under the Philippine Air Force Reserve Command.

== Awards ==
Left Side:

Badges	Philippine Air Force Gold Wings Badge		
1st row		Commander, Philippine Legion of Honor	
2nd row	Legionnaire, Philippine Legion of Honor	Legionnaire, Legion of Merit (from the US Pacific Air Forces)	4 Distinguished Service Stars with three silver anahaw clusters
3rd row	1 Silver Cross Medal	1 Meritorious Achievement Medal	1 Distinguished Service Medal
4th row	1 Chief of Staff of the AFP Medal	1 Gawad sa Kaunlaran	1 Bronze Cross Medal
5th row	1 Silver Wing Medal	Military Merit Medals with four silver anahaw clusters (31 total medals)	2 Military Civic Action Medals
6th row	7 Military Commendation Medals	3 Parangal sa Kapanalig ng Sandatahang Lakas ng Pilipinas	4 Long Service Medals with two campaign stars
7th row	1 Anti-Dissidence Campaign Medal	2 Luzon Anti-Dissidence Campaign Medals	1 Visayas Anti-Dissidence Campaign Medal
8th row	1 Mindanao Anti-Dissidence Campaign Medal with two campaign stars	1 Kalayaan Island Group Campaign Medal	Disaster Relief and Rehabilitation Operations Ribbon

Right Side:

1st row	Philippine Republic Presidential Unit Citation	People Power I Unit Citation	People Power II Unit Citation

Badges and Other Awards:

- Combat Commander's Badge (Philippines)
- AFP Parachutist Badge
- Honorary Airborne Wings - From The Royal Thai Army
- Command Pilot Rating Badge
- Special Leadership Award
- Human Rights Badge
- Secretary of National Defense Saber
- Commanding General, Philippine Air Force Award
- Zobel Scholarship Award

== Personal life ==
He is married to Elis David-Briguez and they have 2 sons.
