= Arthur M. Cordura =

Filipino Air Force General

- Official Portrait, 2025
- Born: 20 October 1969 (age 56); San Fernando, Pampanga, Philippines
- Education: Philippine Military Academy (B.S); National Defense College of the Philippines (MNSA)
- Military career
- Allegiance: Philippines
- Branch: Philippine Air Force
- Service years: 1990 – present
- Rank: Lieutenant general
- Nickname: "Art"
- Service number: O-10243
- Units: Commanding General of the Philippine Air Force; Vice-Chief of Staff of the Armed Forces of the Philippines; Chief of Air Staff; Air Force Reserve Command; 520th Air Base Wing; Air Force Strategy Management Office; Tactical Operations Group 1 Commandant, PAF Officer School
- Conflicts: Islamic insurgency in the Philippines; Communist rebellion in the Philippines
- Awards: Outstanding Achievement Medal; Distinguished Service Star; Bronze Cross Medal; Silver Wing Medal; Military Merit Medal

Arthur Mirasol Cordura is a Philippine Air Force officer who serves as the incumbent Commanding General of the Philippine Air Force since 19 December 2024. Prior to his appointment to the post, Cordura served as the Vice-Chief of Staff of the Armed Forces of the Philippines from 22 November 2022 to 19 December 2024, Chief of Air Staff, commander of the Air Force Reserve Command, and as wing commander of the 520th Air Base Wing.

== Early life and education ==
Cordura was born on 20 October 1969 in San Fernando, Pampanga from a military family. His father is retired Colonel Gerardo Cordura Sr., a former colonel of the Philippine Air Force, while his mother is Fe Cordura. Cordura completed high school at the Don Bosco Academy, Pampanga in 1985 before entering the Philippine Military Academy in 1986, where he graduated as Cum Laude and was at the top 10 of the PMA Bigkis Lahi Class of 1990.

Cordura also excelled and completed the PAF Flying School in 1992, where he finished as the top 3 among the 65 pilots of his class and flew the Cessna T-41 Mescalero primary trainer planes, the SIAI-Marchetti SF.260 basic trainer planes, and the SIAI-Marchetti SF.260 TP basic trainer planes. He also completed various courses locally and abroad. Cordura also earned a Masters in National Security Administration (MNSA) at the National Defense College of the Philippines (NDCP).

== Military career ==
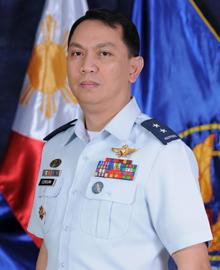
Official Portrait of then-Major General Cordura as Chief of Air Staff

After graduating the PMA and finishing the PAF Flying School, Cordura served most of his junior days as an experienced attack pilot under the 18th Attack Squadron of the 15th Strike Wing, where he flew the McDonnell Douglas MD 520MG Defender light attack helicopters and was deployed in various sorties and air support missions in Mindanao. Cordura later served as an Combat Crew Training Pilot, an Element Lead Training Pilot, and as an Instructor Pilot for the McDonnell Douglas MD 520MG Defender helicopters. Aside from air support roles, Cordura was later placed in other positions related to training, personnel management, strategic management, and tactical services support positions. Cordura later served as Commandant of the PAF Officer School, group commander of the Tactical Operations Group 1 under the AFP Northern Luzon Command, and was later named as the Assistant Chief of Air Staff for Personnel, A-1.

On 2015, then-colonel Cordura was placed as the first commander of the Air Force Strategy Management Office. During his stint, he spearheaded initiatives towards the creation of the air force's Flight Plan 2028 initiative, the PAF's strategic modernization plan aimed at strengthening the air force's posture for both internal and external operations. Cordura would later serve as the Deputy Wing Commander of the 520th Air Base Wing and as the Deputy Commander of the Tactical Operations Command, before becoming a wing commander as he served as commander of the 520th Air Base Wing, and was later promoted to the rank of brigadier general on 18 September 2019. Cordura was later named as Commander of the Air Force Reserve Command, where he succeeded then-Major General Connor Anthony Canlas Sr. and was later promoted to the rank of major general. Cordura later served as the Chief of Air Staff, the Air Force's third highest post. Cordura was later named as the Vice-Chief of Staff of the Armed Forces of the Philippines on 22 November 2022, and later replaced then-Acting Vice Chief of Staff Vice Admiral Rommel Anthony Reyes, and later earned his third star during his promotion to lieutenant general on 13 January 2023.

On 19 December 2024, Cordura was later appointed by President Bongbong Marcos as the 40th Commanding General of the Philippine Air Force, and replaced Lieutenant General Stephen Parreño. During his assumption speech, Cordura emphasized the need for a developmental strategy towards operational success and initiated plans to develop an integrated air defense system aimed to counter potential aerial incursions and counter potential enemy airborne penetrations. Cordura also pushed for his leadership thrust named "FOCUS PAF", which is aimed to forge a Mission-Oriented, Capability-Driven, and Values-Based Air Force and vows to create measures to expand the PAF's external operations under the adoption of the AFP's Comprehensive Archipelagic Defense Concept, which is aimed to promote interoperability, integration, and excellence in potential combined arms operations for enhancing the PAF's external defense posture.

== Awards from Military Service ==
- - Outstanding Achievement Medal
- - Distinguished Service Star Medals
- - Meritorious Achievement Medals
- - Distinguished Service Medals
- Chief of Staff of the AFP Commendation Medal
- Gawad sa Kaunlaran medals
- Bronze Cross Medal
- Silver Wing Medals
- Military Merit Medals (with three bronze spearhead devices)
- Military Merit Medals (with three golden anahaws and two silver anahaws)
- Sagisag ng Ulirang Kawal medal
- Military Civic Action Medal
- Parangal sa Kapanalig ng Sandatahang Lakas ng Pilipinas Medal (with one service star)
- Parangal sa Kapanalig ng Sandatahang Lakas ng Pilipinas Medal

=== Campaign and Service Medals ===
- AFP Long Service Medal (with one campaign star)
- Anti-dissidence Campaign Medals (with two campaign stars)
- Luzon Anti-dissidence Campaign Medals
- Visayas Anti-Dissidence Campaign Medal (with one campaign star)
- Mindanap Anti-Dissidence Campaign Medal
- Disaster Relief and Rehabilitation Operations Ribbon

=== Unit Decorations ===
- Philippine Republic Presidential Unit Citation
- People Power II Unit Citation
- Martial Law Unit Citation

=== Badges ===
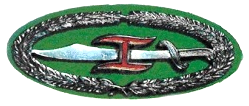
- Combat Commander's Badge
- Philippine Air Force Gold Wings Badge
- PAF Flight Plan 2028 Badge
- Commanding General, Philippine Air Force Badge

== Personal life ==
Cordura is known by his peers and friends as "Art". Cordura is married to Paula Cordura and they have three children.
