= Connor Anthony Canlas Sr. =

Filipino Air Force General

Connor Anthony D. Canlas Sr.
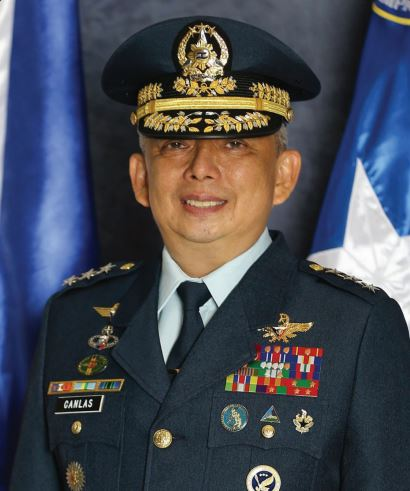
- Lieutenant General Connor Anthony D. Canlas Sr. in 2021
- Born: 20 December 1966 (age 59); Basilio Fernando Air Base, Lipa, Batangas, Philippines
- Education: Philippine Military Academy; University of the Philippines Diliman (B.A Econ) (dropped out)
- Military career
- Allegiance: Philippines
- Branch: Philippine Air Force
- Service years: 1989–2022
- Rank: Lieutenant general
- Service number: O-10055
- Units: Commanding General of the Philippine Air Force; Vice Commander, Philippine Air Force; Air Defense Command; Air Force Reserve Command; AFP Procurement Service; Air Force Research and Development Center; 300th Air Intelligence and Security Wing; Tactical Operations Group 10
- Conflicts: Islamic insurgency in the Philippines; Communist rebellion in the Philippines
- Awards: Outstanding Achievement Medal; Distinguished Service Star; Gold Cross Medal; Bronze Cross Medal; Military Merit Medal

Lieutenant General Connor Anthony David Canlas Sr. is a Filipino retired Air Force General who served as the 38th Commanding General of the Philippine Air Force from 8 December 2021 to 20 December 2022. Prior to his appointment as the head of Philippine Air Force, Canlas served as the Vice Commander of the Philippine Air Force and served as commander of the Air Defense Command and the Air Force Reserve Command.

== Early life and education ==
Connor Anthony David Canlas was born on 20 December 1966 at Basilio Fernando Air Base in Lipa, Batangas, and came from a military family, as he serves as the second child among 8 siblings. His mother is Maria Consuelo David, and his father is former Air Force Colonel Oscar Canlas Sr., a former air force fighter pilot under the 5th Fighter Wing. Oscar served as one of the members of the Reform the Armed Forces Movement (RAM) with then-Colonel Gregorio Honasan. During Connor's time as Cadet Third Class, Connor was called by his superintendent, then-Brigadier General Rodolfo Biazon, as his father was known as one of the leading commanders during the January 1987 coup d'état attempt. Oscar and his unit of nearly 100 soldiers launched an attack at the GMA Network Center in Quezon City, and later defended his actions of attacking the media compound and noted that he was being true to his beliefs and fears of a takeover from the New People's Army (NPA) due to the release of various officials of the Communist Party of the Philippines (CPP). Oscar surrendered to General Fidel V. Ramos moments later, and was arrested from 1987 to 1992.

Canlas finished his primary education in 1980 and his secondary education in 1984 in Don Bosco Technical Institute of Makati, before entering the University of the Philippines Diliman in 1984 for one year to study Bachelor of Arts in Economics. Canlas dropped out a year later and entered the Philippine Military Academy (PMA) in 1985 and graduated as cum laude and reached the top 5 of his class, the "Makatao" Class of 1989, where he served under the Philippine Constabulary. Canlas was awarded the Philippine Constabulary Award for being the highest ranking member of the class to serve the Philippine Constabulary, until 1991, where Canlas shifted to the Philippine Air Force in order to follow his father's footsteps. Canlas earned his wings in 1993 after completing his flight courses and topping his class at the Philippine Air Force Flying School, located in Basilio Fernando Air Base at Lipa, Batangas, where he was awarded the McMicking Award for his performance, and the 100th Training Wing Flying Excellence Medal for reaching the highest ratings of his class flying the Aermacchi AS-211 jet. Aside from flight courses, Canlas also completed the Basic Intelligence Course, the Basic Airborne Course, where he earned his Parachutist Badge and completed the AFP Command & General Staff Course at the Armed Forces of the Philippines Command and General Staff College under Class 53, where Canlas served as the top 1 student of his class.

Canlas also earned his master's degree in information management with honors at the Asia Pacific College in Makati City, and a Master Degree in Training Development at Griffith University in South East Queensland, Australia. Canlas also participated at the Red Flag-Alaska Executive Observer Program in 2021 at Eielson Air Force Base in Fairbanks, Alaska.

== Military career ==
After graduating from PMA, Canlas first served under the Philippine Constabulary and has served for nearly two years, from 1989 to 1991, before moving to the Air Force in the aftermath of the foundation of the Philippine National Police, and has served in several various posts and commands within the Philippine Air Force. Canlas' first deployment as lieutenant was in Davao Oriental, where he served in RSAF11 performing ground operations against the NPA. Canlas also served under the 100th Training Wing, Philippine Air Force, which became known today as the Air Education, Training, and Doctrine Command (AETDC) as an Instructor Pilot, and became a Flight Operations Safety Inspector at the Air Transportation Office (presently known as the Civil Aviation Authority of the Philippines), wherein he contributed to the upgrade of Phil Aviation to ICAO CAT II, before being placed as a logistics officer at the Victoriano Luna General Hospital. After his Command and General Staff Course, he was designated Commander of the Tactical Operations Group 10, where he was promoted to the rank of Colonel, before serving as Ex-O of the Assistant Chief of Air Staff for Intelligence, A2; and became eventually the commander of the 300th Air Intelligence and Security Wing. As the commander of the Tactical Operations Group 10, based at Lumbia Airfield in Cagayan de Oro, he was awarded the Gawad Kalasag for his rescue operations during Tropical Storm Washi, known as Tropical Storm Sendong. Canlas, after his stint at the PAF 2nd Air Division as the Assistant Chief of Air Staff for Operations, A-3. Canlas also served as Acting Commander of the Tactical Operations Wing – Northern Luzon before being named as the Commander of the Air Force Research and Development Center, where he launched the Self-Reliance Defense Program for the construction of the bomb-making facility in the Government Arsenal Headquarters in Camp General Antonio Luna, Limay, Bataan. Canlas was also appointed as the Defense and Armed Forces Attaché to Australia and NRA to New Zealand. Canlas was initially promoted to brigadier general in March 2019 as the commander of the AFP Procurement Service.

Canlas was designated as commander of the Air Force Reserve Command, where he was promoted to Major General and eventually became the commander of the Air Defense Command in March 2020, where he initiated projects to boost the preparedness of the air force's response against aerial intrusions, before being named as the Vice Commander of the Philippine Air Force in 2021. On 8 December 2021, Canlas was named as the 38th Commanding General of the Philippine Air Force and replaced Lieutenant General Allen T. Paredes. As the chief of the air force, he launched his command framework named "LIPAD PAF", incorporating previous command frameworks such as Lead One, InSTEP, and Padayon PAF, with added flavors A for Agile and D for Dependable PAF which focuses on various competencies and enablers, namely in (L)leadership and management, (I)infrastructure and bases, (P)people capability and well-being,(A)air assets and prime equipment and (D)doctrines and policies. Canlas was also promoted to the rank of lieutenant general on 17 December 2021. Under his leadership, Canlas also continued the previous plans for the additional acquisition of the FA-50 jets.

Lieutenant General Canlas retired from military service on 20 December 2022 and was replaced by then-Major General and PAF Vice Commander Stephen Parreño.

== Awards in military service ==
- - Commander, Philippine Legion of Honor
- - 1 Outstanding Achievement Medal
- - 4 Distinguished Service Star Medals
- - 2 Meritorious Achievement Medals
- - 3 Distinguished Service Medals
- - 1 Bronze Cross Medal
- - 1 Silver Wing Medal
- - Military Merit Medal with one bronze spearhead device
- - Military Merit Medal with three silver and one bronze anahaw (27 total medals)
- - 2 Military Civic Action Medals
- - 1 Parangal sa Kapanalig ng Sandatahang Lakas ng Pilipinas
- - Military Commendation Medal with two silver triangle devices (12 total medals)
- - AFP Long Service Medal with 2 service stars (4 total medals)
- - 4 Anti-dissidence Campaign Medals
- - 1 Luzon Anti-dissidence Campaign Medal
- - 1 Visayas Anti-Dissidence Campaign Medal
- - Mindanao Anti-dissidence Campaign Medal with 2 service stars (3 total medals)
- - 1 Jolo and Sulu Campaign Medal
- - Presidential Security Service Ribbon
- - Disaster Relief and Rehabilitation Operations Ribbon with 1 service star

=== Unit Decorations ===
- - Philippine Republic Presidential Unit Citation
- - People Power I Unit Citation
- - People Power II Unit Citation

=== Badges ===
- - Philippine Air Force Gold Wings Badge
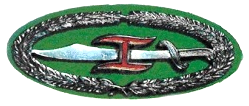
- - Combat Commander's Badge
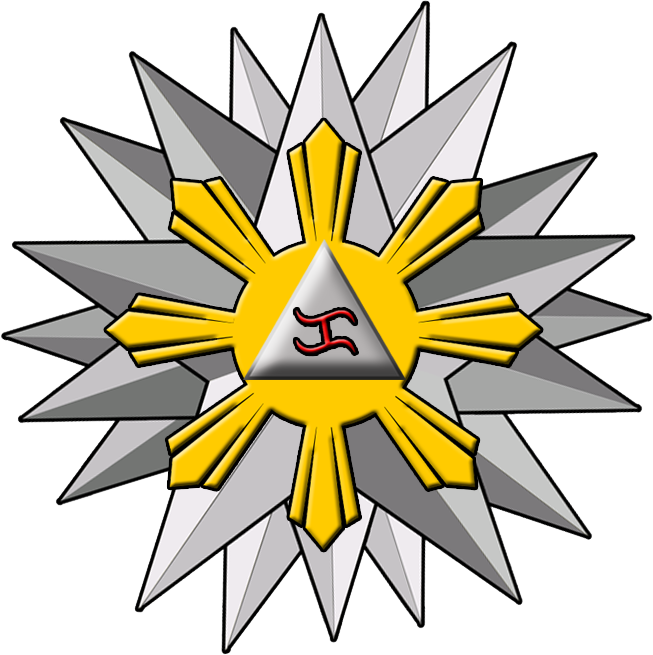
- AFP Command & General Staff Course Badge from the Armed Forces of the Philippines Command and General Staff College

== Personal life ==
Connor Canlas is married to Mary Grace Palanca, a daughter of a retired military officer, and they have four children. The couple first met in Camp Crame, after he finished his Basic Intelligence Course. Canlas is also a known biker and often travels throughout the country and also loves shooting and golfing.
