= Arnulfo Acedera Jr. =

Filipino general (1941–2020)

Arnulfo Acedera
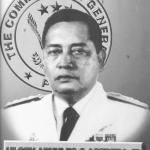
- Arnulfo G. Acedera, Jr. on his Distinguished Aviation Cross recipient

23rd Chief of Staff of the Armed Forces of the Philippines
- In office November 28, 1996 – December 17, 1997
- President: Fidel V. Ramos
- Preceded by: Gen. Arturo Enrile
- Succeeded by: Gen. Clemente Mariano

23rd Commanding General of Philippine Air Force
- In office November 29, 1994 – December 26, 1996
- President: Fidel V. Ramos
- Preceded by: Lt.Gen. Nicanor P. Rodriguez Jr.
- Succeeded by: Lt. Gen. William Hotchkiss III

Deputy Chief of Staff of the Armed Forces of the Philippines
- In office June 14, 1994 – December 26, 1994
- President: Fidel V. Ramos

Personal details
- Born: Arnulfo Gonzalez Acedera, Jr. December 19, 1941 Rizal, Philippine Commonwealth
- Died: June 15, 2020 (aged 78)
- Resting place: Libingan ng mga Bayani, Taguig, Philippines
- Education: AFP Command and General Staff; PAF Flying School; Philippine Military Academy; Mapua Institute of Technology
- Awards: Distinguished Aviation Cross; Distinguished Service Star

Military service
- Allegiance: Philippines
- Branch/service: Philippines
- Years of service: 1963 – 1997
- Rank: General
- Unit: 1st Air Division 205th Helicopter Wing; 250th Presidential Airlift Wing Air Force Research and Development Center
- Commands: Armed Forces of the Philippines Philippine Air Force Deputy Chief of Staff of the Armed Forces of the Philippines

Arnulfo Gonzalez Acedera, Jr. (19 December 1941 – 15 June 2020) was a Filipino general who served as the Commanding General of the Philippine Air Force and as the Chief of Staff of the Armed Forces of the Philippines. He was a recipient of awards such as the Distinguished Service Star, Distinguished Aviation Cross, Bronze Cross Medal and Silver Wing Medal.

== Early life ==
Acedera was born on December 19, 1941, in Cardona, Rizal to Arnulfo Acedera Sr., and Virginia Gonzales. Arnulfo Sr. was a pioneering aviator with the Philippine Army Air Corps under Col. Jesus Villamor, and fellow Calapeno and World War II hero, Lt. Jose Gozar.

== Education ==
Arnulfo Jr. wanted to study at the Mapua Institute of Technology and that way get a degree in civil engineering, but changed his mind and went to the Philippine Military Academy instead in 1959 from which he graduated four years later. He continued on studying flying in Lipa, Batangas at the PAF Flying School from which he graduated in 1965.

== Military career ==
From 1966 to 1967 he was a commander for both the 3rd and 4th PAF Detachments which were part of 601st Liaison Squadron and 205th Composite Wing. In 1973 he flew Lockheed C-130 Hercules for training purposes at Lockheed Martin, Marietta, Georgia. In 1976 he took Swearingen Merlin course at San Antonio, Texas, and by 1983 passed a course at the Command and General Staff College, Fort Bonifacio. From June 14 to November 8, 1994, he became Deputy Chief of Staff and from November 8 of the same year to December 26 of the next year, worked at the Armed Forces of the Philippines. From the same date and till November 28, 1996, he was a commanding General of the Philippine Air Force and then until December 17, 1997, was a Chief of Staff in the Armed Forces of the Philippines.

== Awards in military service ==
- Philippine Republic Presidential Unit Citation
- Martial Law Unit Citation
- People Power I Unit Citation
- Philippine Legion of Honor
- Distinguished Service Star
- Distinguished Aviation Cross
- Disaster Relief & Rehabilitation Operation Ribbon
- Anti-dissidence Campaign Medal
- Luzon Anti Dissidence Campaign Medal
- Visayas Anti-Dissidence Campaign Medal
- Mindanao Anti-dissidence Campaign Medal
- Long Service Medal
