= 1st Air Force Wing Reserve, PAF =

1st Air Force Wing Reserve, Philippine Air Force
- Badge of the 1st Air Force Wing Reserve, PAF
- Country: Republic of the Philippines
- Allegiance: President of the Philippines, Armed Forces of the Philippines
- Branch: Philippine Air Force
- Type: Wing, Air Force Reserve Force
- Role: Combat-support unit (military reserve)
- Part of: Air Force Reserve Command (AFRC)
- Headquarters: Colonel Jesus A. Villamor Air Base, Pasay, Philippines
- Motto(s): Laang Kawal (Old Soldier)

Commanders
- Current commander: Brg Gen Raymundo T. Francisco
- Notable commanders: Brg Gen Elihu A. Ybañez, AFP; Col Consuelo B Estepa, PAFR GSC MNSA

The 1st Air Force Wing Reserve, Philippine Air Force (1st AFWR PAF), formerly called the 1st Ready Reserve Air Wing (1RRAW), is a combat-support unit under the Air Force Reserve Command (AFRC) of the Philippine Air Force (PAF). It is based in Colonel Jesus A. Villamor Air Base in Pasay, Metro Manila, Philippines. Its headquarters offices are located at the AFRC building inside the airbase. The wing covers all Philippine Air Force reserve units in the National Capital Region (NCR). 1st AFWR is divided into the 11th, 12th, and 13th Air Force Groups (Reserve) (AFGR). Currently, the 1st AFWR is under the command of Brigadier General Raymundo T. Francisco, who took over the position in March 2015.

The motto of the 1st AFWR PAF is Laang Kawal (in Tagalog), which means 'Old Soldier'. Personnel of the 1st AFWR are military reservists, consisting of commissioned officers, non-commissioned officers, and enlisted members; all of whom have their own primary civilian occupation or profession, and serve part-time in the air force.

A reserve wing in the Philippine Air Force is equivalent in size to a brigade in the army. A reserve air group is equivalent to a battalion. Subordinate units in the reserve air group include squadrons (companies) and flights (platoons).

In Luzon, the other air force reserve wings are the 2nd AFWR based at Clark Air Base that covers the area from Central Luzon up to all of northern Luzon, and the 3rd AFWR at Fernando Air Base in Batangas that covers all of southern Luzon from Cavite through the Bicol Region.
