= 2nd Air Force Wing Reserve, PAF =

2nd Air Force Wing Reserve
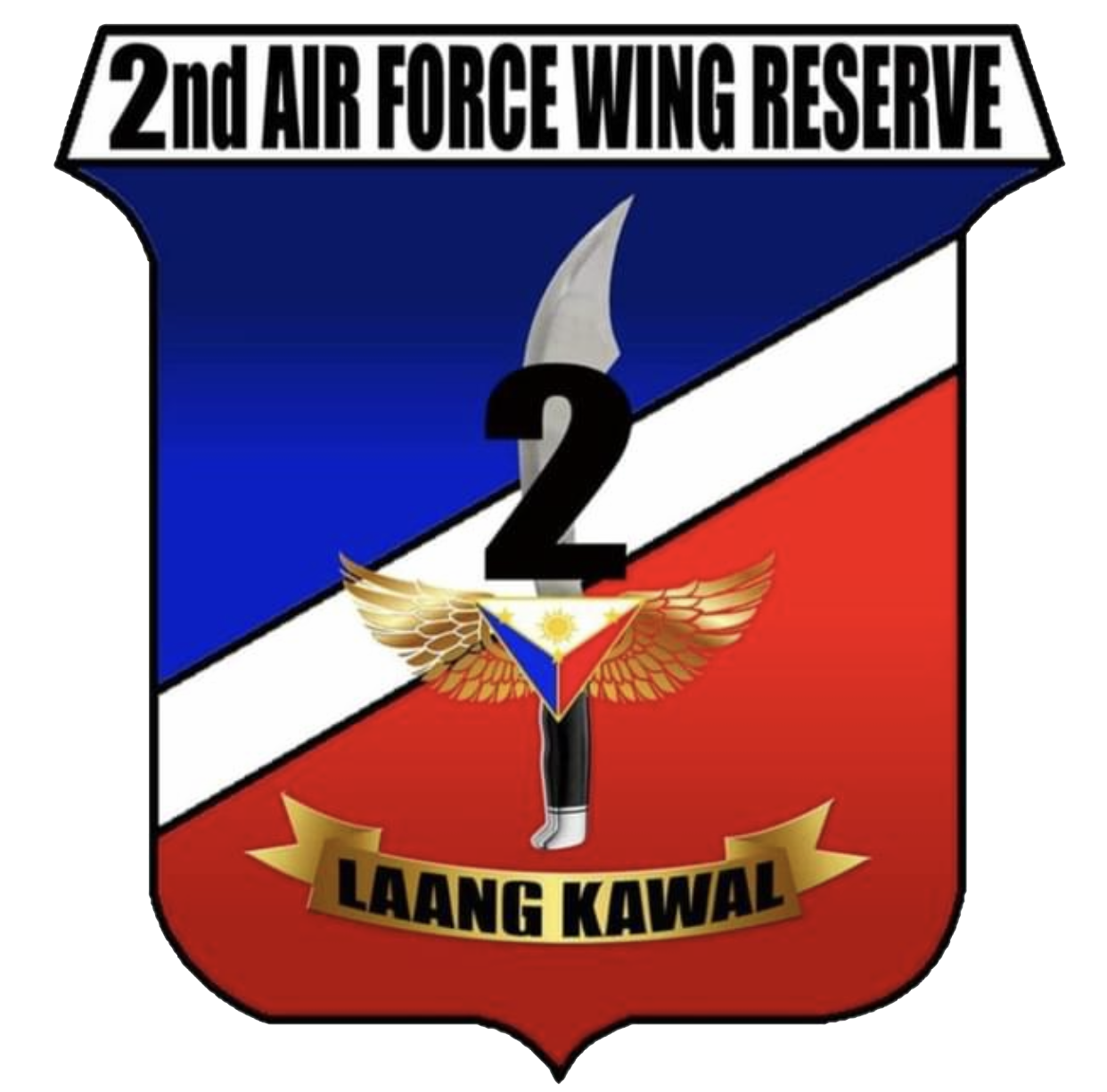
- badge of the 2nd Air Force Wing Reserve
- Country: Republic of the Philippines
- Allegiance: President of the Philippines, Armed Forces of the Philippines
- Branch: Philippine Air Force
- Type: Wing, Air Force Reserve Force
- Role: Combat & Service Support, Force Multiplier, Disaster Rescue & Relief, and Community Service
- Part of: Air Force Reserve Command (AFRC)
- Headquarters: Clark Air Base, Mabalacat City, Pampanga, Philippines
- Motto(s): Above and Beyond

Commanders
- Current commander: LTC MICHAEL ODYLON L ROMERO PAFR (GSC)

The 2nd Air Force Wing Reserve (2nd AFWR), is a combat and service support unit of the Philippine Air Force Reserve under the Air Force Reserve Command (AFRC), Philippine Air Force (PAF). It is based in Clark Air Base in Mabalacat City, Pampanga, Philippines. The wing covers the area from Central Luzon up to all of northern Luzon. 2nd AFWR is divided into the 21st, 22nd, and 23rd Air Force Groups Reserve (AFGR). Currently, the 2nd AFWR is under the command of LTC MICHAEL ODYLON L ROMERO PAFR (GSC).

A reserve wing in the Philippine Air Force is equivalent in size to a brigade in the army. A reserve air group is equivalent to a battalion. Subordinate units in the reserve air group include squadrons (companies) and flights (platoons).

In Luzon, the other air force reserve wings are the 1st AFWR based at Colonel Jesus A. Villamor Air Base that covers all Air Force reserve units in the National Capital Region (NCR), and the 3rd AFWR at Fernando Air Base in Batangas that covers all of southern Luzon from Cavite through the Bicol Region.

== Units ==
The following are the units of the 2nd Air Force Wing Reserve:

- 21st Air Force Group Reserve – Loakan Airport, Baguio, Benguet
- 22nd Air Force Group Reserve – TOG 2, Cauayan City, Isabela City
- 23rd Air Force Group Reserve – Cesar Basa Air Base, Floridablanca, Pampanga
