= Arturo Enrile =

Secretary of Transportation and Communications
- In office April 16, 1997 – January 14, 1998
- President: Fidel Ramos
- Preceded by: Amado S. Lagdameo
- Succeeded by: Josefina Trinidad-Luchauco

24th Chief of Staff of the Armed Forces of the Philippines
- In office April 15, 1994 – November 30, 1996
- President: Fidel Ramos
- Preceded by: Lisandro Abadia
- Succeeded by: Arnulfo Acedera Jr.

Commanding General of the Philippine Army
- In office April 11, 1991 – April 15, 1994
- Preceded by: Lisandro Abadia
- Succeeded by: Romulo Yap

Superintendent Philippine Military Academy
- In office 1989–1991
- President: Corazon Cojuangco-Aquino

Personal details
- Born: Arturo Tiongson-Enrile; June 20, 1940 Lucena, Commonwealth of the Philippines
- Died: January 14, 1998 (aged 57) Makati, Philippines
- Resting place: Libingan ng mga Bayani
- Spouse: Mara Enrile
- Children: Tanya
- Education: Philippine Military Academy

Military service
- Allegiance: Philippines
- Branch/service: Philippine Army
- Years of service: 1962–1996
- Rank: General
- Unit: Chief of Staff, AFP; Philippine Army
- Battles/wars: Communist rebellion in the Philippines; Moro conflict

Arturo "Boy" Tiongson Enrile (June 20, 1940 – January 14, 1998) was the Secretary of the Department of Transportation and Communications from 1997 to 1998. He also served as the 24th Chief of Staff of the Armed Forces of the Philippines from 1994 to 1996.

== Personal life ==
He was married to Mara Enrile and had a daughter named Tanya.

== Career ==
=== Military ===
Enrile was a graduate of Philippine Military Academy Class of 1962. In 1975, he commanded the newly activated 41st Infantry Battalion under the auspices of 1st Infantry Division of Philippine Army. He was also the first commander of the 1st Army Training Group (1ATG) which was created in 1976 also under the 1st Infantry Division. He was then appointed as superintendent of the Philippine Military Academy on August 6, 1989. Enrile led the negotiations with the rebel leaders during the 1989 Philippine coup attempt.

Enrile was appointed Commanding General of the Philippine Army in 1991. He served as Vice Chief of Staff of the Armed Forces of the Philippines before being appointed by then Fidel Ramos as Chief of Staff of the Armed Forces of the Philippines on April 12, 1994. He served as AFP Chief until November 30, 1996, after President Ramos extended his appointment as AFP Chief of Staff.

=== Awards in military service ===
- Philippine Republic Presidential Unit Citation
- Distinguished Service Star
- Distinguished Conduct Star
- Anti-dissidence Campaign Medal
- Luzon Anti Dissidence Campaign Medal
- Mindanao Anti-dissidence Campaign Medal
- Long Service Medal
- Disaster Relief & Rehabilitation Operation Ribbon
- Silver Wing Medal
- Wounded Personnel Medal

== DOTC Secretary ==
On April 16, 1997, Enrile was appointed as Secretary of the Department of Transportation of the Philippines. He served as DOTC secretary until his untimely demise on January 14, 1998.

== Death ==
Enrile died in January 1998 after his major organs (liver heart, kidney, lungs) were attacked by bacteria. Doctors spent a lot of time explaining to media representatives and live TV cameras that the former AFP chief of staff did not die from the Hong Kong Bird Flu. Enrile, 57, was rushed to the Makati Medical Center Monday after collapsing at home. Doctors said the retired general was in a state of shock when he reached the hospital. An official medical bulletin said Enrile died from complications arising from virulent viral infection, or "multiple organ failure due to septic shock and streptococcal pneumonic bacteraemia." President Ramos expressed his deep condolences for the "untimely demise of a devoted public servant and leader" and attended the wake.

He was interred at the Libingan ng mga Bayani in Taguig.
