= Dosado (surname) =

Dosado is a surname. Notable people with the surname include:

- Jesus Dosado (1939–2020), Filipino prelate of the Catholic Church
- Rozzano Dosado Briguez (born 1964), Filipino general
