= Distinguished Navy Cross =

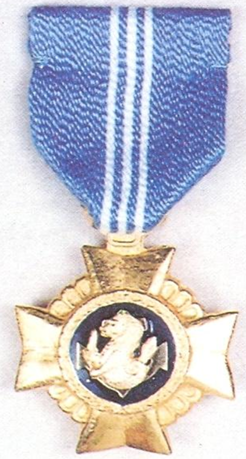
- Type: Decoration
- Awarded for: distinguished heroism or extraordinary achievement in naval operations
- Country: Philippines
- Presented by: Philippines
- Eligibility: Members of the Armed Forces of the Philippines
- Status: Currently awarded

Precedence
- Next (higher): Gold Cross
- Equivalent: Distinguished Aviation Cross (Philippine Air Force)
- Next (lower): Silver Cross

The Distinguished Navy Cross (DNC) is a decoration of the Armed Forces of the Philippines (AFP) which recognizes distinguished heroism while in naval operations.

== Requirements ==
The DNC is awarded to military personnel of the AFP who are serving in any capacity with the Philippine Navy, or with the naval components of the Army, and/or the Air Force. It calls for the recipient's "distinguished heroism" (i.e. extraordinary achievement), that of which must be evidenced by voluntary action in the face of great danger above and beyond the call of duty while participating in naval operations.

The result must be so exceptional and outstanding as to set the recipient apart from their comrades.

== Description ==
=== Obverse ===
The award is a gold Maltese cross with grooves between each arm (i.e. flanges). At the center is the Philippine Navy seal consisting of a gold-plated Philippine sea lion holding a dagger in its right hand and a Sampaguita branch in the left, wholly superimposed on an anchor. The seal is placed on a navy-blue disc surrounded by laurel leaves.

Face value-wise, it has a resemblance to the American Navy Cross.

=== Reverse ===
In an arc, the words "DISTINGUISHED NAVY CROSS" is written; the space inside the arc is reserved for the engraved name of the recipient.

=== Symbolism and Significance ===
Philippine Navy seal

- Sealion (leodelfin) over an anchor - sea power
- Sampaguita branch clutched by the sealion - dignity and mobility of the Navy
- Navy blue background - sincerity and devotion to duty

Laurel wreath - the honor given for gallantry and courage displayed

Gold cross - the risk of life and sacrifice in rendering the conspicuous act/s warranting the DNC

Grooved border - excelling performance

=== Service Ribbon ===
The ribbon is cornflower in color and has three small white lines at the center. They share the same ribbon as the Gold Cross Medal.

=== Appurtenances ===
Every subsequent award of the DNC to an individual shall be appurtenant with an Anahaw Leaf, and is awarded as follows:

- Bronze Anahaw Leaf - for the first, second, third, and fourth succeeding award
- Silver Anahaw Leaf - for every fifth succeeding Bronze Anahaw Leaf
- Gold Anahaw Leaf - for every fifth Silver Anahaw Leaf

These devices are to be worn on the DNC's ribbon bar in dress uniforms, with the tips of the leaf pointed upward.
