= Commanding General of the Air Force (Philippines) =

Position held by a three-star general in the Philippine Air Force

Commanding General of the Philippine Air Force

- Incumbent; Lieutenant General Arthur M. Cordura since December 20, 2024
- Philippine Air Force
- Reports to: Chief of Staff of the Armed Forces of the Philippines
- Appointer: President of the Philippines with the consent of the Commission on Appointments
- Term length: 2 years
- Constituting instrument: Republic Act No. 11939
- Formation: July 1, 1947
- Deputy: Vice Commander of the Philippine Air Force; Chief of Air Staff

The Commanding General of the Philippine Air Force is the commander and chief of the Philippine Air Force, the aerial warfare branch of the Armed Forces of the Philippines. It is normally held by a three-star rank of Lieutenant General. The holder of the position has operational control and is responsible for overall operations of the service, and directly reports to the Chief of Staff of the armed forces.

== Powers and Responsibilities ==
The Commanding General of the Philippine Air Force serves as the overall head of the Philippine Army, where he/she has full operational control and command of the Air Force. Unlike its US-based counterpart, the Chief of Staff of the United States Air Force, the CGPAF has direct command oversight of the Air Force's activities, air operations, and administrative functions to all Air Force units, down from the Air Force's enlisted personnel, and up to the Air Force's different air wings, commands and tactical operation groups under its branch. The CGPAF directly reports all air operations, activities and functions to the Chief of Staff of the Armed Forces of the Philippines and serves as the primary advisor for the Secretary of National Defense in related matters. The CGPAF's command advices can also be directed and transmitted to the President of the Philippines, who serves as the Commander-in-Chief of the Armed Forces of the Philippines. The CGPAF is also tasked for the air force's resource management, maintenance checks, and is responsible for the command's training and readiness strategies through monitoring the air force's air defense systems, radar and detection facilities, and airbase development. The CGPAF also hosts and attend a variety international collaboration programs aimed to improve and increase ties of other air forces in the region, which fosters potential partnerships in future military exercises and even joint patrol missions in the country's airspace.

The CGPAF has full strategic operations command of the air force and does these tasks through their leadership strategic thrusts, aimed at guaranteeing that the air force can respond in addressing the command's needs through the command's programs such as the Air Force's modernization programs, capability and doctrine development measures, and addressing the professional and welfare programs of the command. The CGPAF is also responsible for managing the command's research & development-related objectives aimed to promote both innovation and safety in all air force planes and is also in charge in managing humanitarian assistance operations in times of disasters or calamities.

== Organization and Term Limit ==
The CGPAF is directly assisted by two deputies, namely the Vice Commander, Philippine Air Force, who serves as the CGPAF's direct assistant in implementing the Air Force's action plans and operations, and the Chief of Air Staff. The Vice Commander also has the power to assist the CGPAF in their absence, while the Chief of Air Staff serves as the chief of the air force's organizational staff, which supervises the air force's administrative commands, joint staff commands, and civilian offices, and assures the CGPAF that the air force's operational commands run smoothly and efficiently.

The CGPAF is directly appointed by the President of the Philippines, who also has the power to end the fixed term of the CGPAF at their pleasure, and needs the consent and approval of the Commission on Appointments for both briefing and confirmation of their post through public hearings. The CGPAF's serves under a fixed-term length that lasts two years, which serves under the provisions and rules of Republic Act No. 11939, and can only be extended and approved in times of war and national emergencies with the approval of Congress.

== List of Officeholders ==
The following are the Commanding Generals/Chiefs of the Philippine Air Force since its foundation in 1947, with some generals commanding various units from the Philippine Army Air Corps until it was replaced by the Philippine Air Force in 1947.

=== Commanding Generals ===
No.	Portrait	Commanding General (Primary Background)	Took office	Left office	Time in office	President	Ref.
1	Pelagio A. Cruz (Attack)	Colonel; Pelagio A. Cruz (Attack)	9 June 1947	16 March 1951	3 years, 280 days	Manuel Roxas; Elpidio Quirino	
2	Eustacio D. Orobia (Fighter)	Brigadier General; Eustacio D. Orobia (Fighter)	16 March 1951	2 June 1952	1 year, 78 days	Elpidio Quirino	
3	Benito Nicano R. Ebuen (Infantry, Artillery, and Airbase Commander)	Brigadier General; Benito Nicano R. Ebuen (Infantry, Artillery, and Airbase Commander)	2 June 1952	3 November 1953	1 year, 154 days	Elpidio Quirino	
*	Pelagio A. Cruz (Attack)	Brigadier General; Pelagio A. Cruz (Attack)	3 November 1953	17 December 1956	3 years, 44 days	Elpidio Quirino; Ramon Magsaysay	
*	Benito Nicano R. Ebuen (Infantry, Artillery, and Airbase Commander)	Brigadier General; Benito Nicano R. Ebuen (Infantry, Artillery, and Airbase Commander)	17 December 1956	17 March 1957	90 days	Ramon Magsaysay	
4	Pedro Q. Molina (Infantry, Bombers, and Tactical Operations)	Brigadier General; Pedro Q. Molina (Infantry, Bombers, and Tactical Operations)	17 March 1957	17 July 1962	5 years, 122 days	Ramon Magsaysay; Carlos P. Garcia; Diosdado Macapagal	
5	Jonas A. Victoria (Artillery, Airbase Commander and Tactical Operations)	Brigadier General; Jonas A. Victoria (Artillery, Airbase Commander and Tactical Operations)	17 July 1962	11 June 1964	1 year, 330 days	Diosdado Macapagal	
6	Agusto L. Jurado (Infantry, Logistics, and Tactical Operations)	Brigadier General; Agusto L. Jurado (Infantry, Logistics, and Tactical Operations)	11 June 1964	1 June 1965	355 days	Diosdado Macapagal	
7	Victor H. Dizon (Bombers, Training and Communications)	Brigadier General; Victor H. Dizon (Bombers, Training and Communications)	1 June 1965	29 December 1965	211 days	Diosdado Macapagal	
8	Jose B. Ramos (Training and Communications)	Brigadier General; Jose B. Ramos (Training and Communications)	29 December 1965	15 August 1967	1 year, 229 days	Diosdado Macapagal; Ferdinand Marcos	
9	Emmanuel S. Casabar (Infantry, Intelligence, and Fighters)	Brigadier General; Emmanuel S. Casabar (Infantry, Intelligence, and Fighters)	15 August 1967	27 May 1968	286 days	Ferdinand Marcos	
10	Juan B. Guevara (Intelligence and Communications)	Brigadier General; Juan B. Guevara (Intelligence and Communications)	27 May 1968	8 September 1968	104 days	Ferdinand Marcos	
11	Jesus Z. Singson (Field Artillery and Fighters)	Brigadier General; Jesus Z. Singson (Field Artillery and Fighters)	8 September 1968	15 January 1972	3 years, 129 days	Ferdinand Marcos	
12	Jose L. Rancudo (Fighters)	Major General; Jose L. Rancudo (Fighters)	15 January 1972	27 March 1976	4 years, 72 days	Ferdinand Marcos	
13	Samuel O. Sarmiento (Training and Fighters)	Major General; Samuel O. Sarmiento (Training and Fighters)	27 March 1976	1 October 1981	5 years, 188 days	Ferdinand Marcos	
14	Petronio M. Lapeña (Training and Fighters)	Brigadier General; Petronio M. Lapeña (Training and Fighters)	1 October 1981	5 April 1982	186 days	Ferdinand Marcos	
15	Vicente M. Piccio, Jr. (Training and Fighters)	Major General; Vicente M. Piccio, Jr. (Training and Fighters)	5 April 1982	25 February 1986	3 years, 326 days	Ferdinand Marcos	
16	Ramon J. Farolan, Jr. (Fighters and Staff)	Major General; Ramon J. Farolan, Jr. (Fighters and Staff)	25 February 1986	8 October 1986	195 days	Corazon Aquino	
17	Antonio E. Sotelo (Fighters and Staff)	Major General; Antonio E. Sotelo (Fighters and Staff)	8 October 1986	6 April 1988	1 year, 211 days	Corazon Aquino	
18	Jose L. De Leon, Jr. (Fighters)	Major General; Jose L. De Leon, Jr. (Fighters)	6 April 1988	24 February 1990	1 year, 324 days	Corazon Aquino	
19	Geraldo C. Protacio (Fighters and Staff)	Major General; Geraldo C. Protacio (Fighters and Staff)	24 February 1990	19 April 1991	1 year, 54 days	Corazon Aquino	
20	Loven C. Abadia (Fighters and Helicopter Tactical Operations)	Lieutenant General; Loven C. Abadia (Fighters and Helicopter Tactical Operations)	19 April 1991	8 August 1992	1 year, 111 days	Corazon Aquino; Fidel V. Ramos	
21	Leopoldo S. Acot (Intelligence, Helicopter Tactical Operations and Staff)	Lieutenant General; Leopoldo S. Acot (Intelligence, Helicopter Tactical Operations and Staff)	8 August 1992	13 December 1993	1 year, 127 days	Fidel V. Ramos	
22	Nicasio P. Rodriguez, Jr. (Airlifts)	Lieutenant General; Nicasio P. Rodriguez, Jr. (Airlifts)	13 December 1993	26 December 1995	2 years, 13 days	Fidel V. Ramos	
23	Arnulfo E. Acedera (Airlifts and Helicopter Tactical Operations)	Lieutenant General; Arnulfo E. Acedera (Airlifts and Helicopter Tactical Operations)	26 December 1995	29 November 1996	339 days	Fidel V. Ramos	
24	William Hotchkiss III (Fighters)	Lieutenant General; William Hotchkiss III (Fighters)	29 November 1996	8 January 1999	2 years, 40 days	Fidel V. Ramos; Joseph Estrada	
25	Willie C. Florendo (Airlifts)	Lieutenant General; Willie C. Florendo (Airlifts)	8 January 1999	10 October 2000	1 year, 276 days	Joseph Estrada	
26	Benjamin P. Defensor, Jr.	Lieutenant General; Benjamin P. Defensor, Jr. (Attack, Helicopter Tactical Operations and Staff)	10 October 2000	10 September 2002	1 year, 335 days	Joseph Estrada; Gloria Macapagal Arroyo	
27	Nestor R. Santillan (Intelligence, Training and Staff)	Lieutenant General; Nestor R. Santillan (Intelligence, Training and Staff)	10 September 2002	14 May 2004	1 year, 237 days	Gloria Macapagal Arroyo	
*	Arcadio L. Seron (Officer In Charge)	Major General; Arcadio L. Seron (Officer In Charge) (Helicopter Tactical Operations and Staff)	14 May 2004	7 July 2004	64 days	Gloria Macapagal Arroyo	
28	Jose L. Reyes (Attack)	Lieutenant General; Jose L. Reyes (Attack)	7 July 2004	2 February 2007	2 years, 210 days	Gloria Macapagal Arroyo	
29	Horacio S. Tolentino (Helicopter Tactical Operations and Staff)	Lieutenant General; Horacio S. Tolentino (Helicopter Tactical Operations and Staff)	2 February 2007	4 January 2008	336 days	Gloria Macapagal Arroyo	
30	Pedrito S. Cadungog (Training, Helicopter Tactical Operations and Staff)	Lieutenant General; Pedrito S. Cadungog (Training, Helicopter Tactical Operations and Staff)	4 January 2008	9 January 2009	1 year, 5 days	Gloria Macapagal Arroyo	
31	Oscar H. Rabena (Attack, Helicopter Tactical Operations and Staff)	Lieutenant General; Oscar H. Rabena (Attack, Helicopter Tactical Operations and Staff)	9 January 2009	9 January 2012	3 years, 0 days	Gloria Macapagal Arroyo; Benigno Aquino III	
32	Lauro Catalino G. Dela Cruz (Helicopter Tactical Operations and Staff)	Lieutenant General; Lauro Catalino G. Dela Cruz (Helicopter Tactical Operations and Staff)	9 January 2012	30 April 2014	2 years, 111 days	Benigno Aquino III	
33	Jeffrey F. Delgado (Attack and Staff)	Lieutenant General; Jeffrey F. Delgado (Attack and Staff)	30 April 2014	9 March 2016	1 year, 314 days	Benigno Aquino III	
34	Edgar R. Fallorina (Helicopter Tactical Operations and Staff)	Lieutenant General; Edgar R. Fallorina (Helicopter Tactical Operations and Staff)	9 March 2016	24 October 2017	1 year, 229 days	Benigno Aquino III; Rodrigo Duterte	
35	Galileo Gerard R. Kintanar, Jr. (Attack, Training and Staff)	Lieutenant General; Galileo Gerard R. Kintanar, Jr. (Attack, Training and Staff)	24 October 2017	21 December 2018	1 year, 58 days	Rodrigo Duterte	
36	Rozzano D. Briguez (Helicopter Tactical Operations, Training and Staff)	Lieutenant General; Rozzano D. Briguez (Helicopter Tactical Operations, Training and Staff)	21 December 2018	16 January 2020	1 year, 26 days	Rodrigo Duterte	
37	Allen T. Paredes (Attack, Logistics and Staff)	Lieutenant General; Allen T. Paredes (Attack, Logistics and Staff)	16 January 2020	7 December 2021	1 year, 325 days	Rodrigo Duterte	
38	Connor Anthony D. Canlas Sr. (Attack, Helicopter Tactical Operations and Staff)	Lieutenant General; Connor Anthony D. Canlas Sr. (Attack, Helicopter Tactical Operations and Staff)	7 December 2021	20 December 2022	1 year, 13 days	Rodrigo Duterte; Bongbong Marcos	
39	Stephen Parreño (Airlifts, Helicopter Tactical Operations and Staff)	Lieutenant General; Stephen Parreño (Airlifts, Helicopter Tactical Operations and Staff)	20 December 2022	19 December 2024	1 year, 365 days	Bongbong Marcos	
40	Arthur M. Cordura (Attack, Airbase Commander and Staff)	Lieutenant General; Arthur M. Cordura (Attack, Airbase Commander and Staff)	20 December 2024	Incumbent	1 year, 281 days	Bongbong Marcos	

== See also ==
- Armed Forces of the Philippines
- Chief of Staff of the Armed Forces of the Philippines
- Philippine Air Force
- Philippine Navy
