= William Hotchkiss III =

Philippine Air Force general

Director General of the Civil Aviation Authority of the Philippines
- In office August 29, 2012 – June 30, 2016
- President: Benigno Aquino III
- Preceded by: Ramon Gutierrez
- Succeeded by: Capt. Jim Sydiongco

24th Commanding General of the Philippine Air Force
- In office November 29, 1996 – January 8, 1999
- President: Fidel V. Ramos; Joseph Ejercito Estrada
- Preceded by: Lt. Gen. Arnulfo G. Acedera Jr.
- Succeeded by: Lt. Gen. Willie C. Florendo

Personal details
- Born: January 8, 1943 (age 83) Cantilan, Surigao del Sur, Commonwealth of the Philippines
- Spouse: Maria Teresa Paloma y Escano-Hotchkiss
- Children: Karla Hotchkiss; Tanya Hotchkiss; William E. Hotchkiss IV; Steven E. Hotchkiss
- Education: Philippine State College of Aeronautics
- Profession: Military

Military service
- Allegiance: Republic of the Philippines
- Branch/service: Philippine Air Force
- Rank: Lieutenant General
- Commands: Commanding General, PAF; Elite Blue Diamonds of the PAF

Lieutenant General William Knowles Yuhico Hotchkiss III (born January 8, 1943) is a retired Philippine Air Force general who served as the 24th Commanding General of the Philippine Air Force (PAF) and the former Director General of the Civil Aviation Authority of the Philippines. He is also the current President of the Cantilan Bank, a rural bank in Surigao del Sur.

He served various positions in preparation to the more demanding position in the PAF. He was a member of the famed Blue Diamonds, and a combat ready fighter and trainer pilot. On November 29, 1996, he became the Commanding General of the PAF. Further, in line with environmental protection, he is an ex officio member of the Philippine Eagle Foundation.

== Military career ==
Hotchkiss joined the Philippine Air Force as cadet in Philippine Air Force Flying School in 1962 where he graduated in 1964. He became an instructor pilot after graduation.

In 1966, he joined the 5th Fighter Wing in Basa Air Base where he stayed for ten years and became a member of Elite Blue Diamonds of the Philippine Air Force. He flew 79 combat sorties against the enemies of the state at that time.

Over the years of dedicated service in the Philippine Air Force, he garnered several awards and decorations, in recognition of his professionalism and outstanding contribution and was assigned to different key sensitive positions up the ladder until he assumed position as the 24th Commanding General of the Philippine Air Force on November 29, 1996, until 1999.

== Cantilan Bank ==
After his retirement in 1999, Hotchkiss joined the Cantilan Bank, a rural bank jointly founded by his father and sixteen other incorporators in 1980.

The rural bank is compliant with international standards and operates as a community bank within the country.

Currently, Hotchkiss is the president and chairman of the board of Cantilan Bank.

== CAAP Director General ==
On August 29, 2012, Hotchkiss was appointed as director general of the Civil Aviation Authority of the Philippines (CAAP), ending a two-month stint as a mere director and officer in charge of an agency vital to aviation reforms.

He is the former Director General of the Civil Aviation Authority of the Philippines. He is the current President of the Cantilan Bank, a rural bank in Surigao del Sur. He became the 24th commanding general of the Philippine Air Force (PAF).

He served various positions in preparation to the more demanding position in the PAF. He was a member of the famed Blue Diamonds, a combat ready pilot. On November 29, 1996, he became the Commanding General of the PAF. Further, in line with environmental protection, he is an ex officio member of the Philippine Eagle Foundation.
