= Ramon Farolan =

Philippine Air Force general (1934–2023)

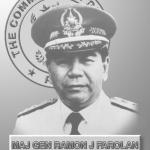

16th Commanding General of the Philippine Air Force
- In office February 24 – October 8, 1986
- President: Corazon Aquino
- Preceded by: Vicente Piccio
- Succeeded by: Antonio Sotelo

Personal details
- Born: Ramon Antonio Jamias Farolan; August 31, 1934 Baguio, Philippine Commonwealth
- Died: May 31, 2023 (aged 88)
- Spouse: Sylvia M. Joaquin
- Children: 3
- Education: University of the Philippines Diliman; Philippine Military Academy
- Profession: General, government official, diplomat, columnist

Military service
- Allegiance: Philippines
- Branch/service: Philippine Army; Philippine Air Force
- Battles/wars: Hukbalahap rebellion

Ramon J. Farolan (August 31, 1934 – May 31, 2023) was a Philippine Air Force general, government official, diplomat and columnist.

== Early life ==
Farolan was born on August 31, 1934, in Baguio. He would finish his secondary studies at the University of the Philippines Diliman before attending the Philippine Military Academy (PMA). He graduated from the PMA in 1956. He would accomplish the Philippine Air Force Flying School Class in 1957. He would also obtain a master's degree at the Asian Institute of Management in 1975.

== Career ==
Farolan initially served in the Philippine Army in Quezon as part of the 4th Battalion Combat Team. His unit was tasked to quell the Hukbalahap rebellion. He would be recalled to the Philippine Air Force (PAF) to undergo military pilot training and be an instructor at the PAF Flying School.

Farolan served various roles in both the military and civilian government between 1964 and 1986. These positions included military supervisor for Customs, administrator of the Civil Aviation Authority, and commissioner of the Bureau of Customs, also serving as chairman of the Board of Examiners for Customs Brokers.

On February 24, 1986, Farolan was named Commanding General of the Philippine Air Force following the People Power Revolution which deposed President Ferdinand Marcos. He served until his retirement on October 8 in the same year.

== Later life and death ==
After his retirement from the military, Farolan would serve as the Philippine Ambassador to Indonesia for two and a half years and later head the Export Processing Zone Authority for two years. He was also president of the Philippine Football Federation.

Farolan also became a columnist for The Philippine Star and the Philippine Daily Inquirer. He would write for the former in the late 1990s to the early 2000s, where he also served as president and editor-in-chief; for the latter from 2003 to 2022.

== Personal life ==
Farolan was married to Sylvia M. Joaquin of Quezon City and had three children. Farolan died on May 31, 2023.
