= Distinguished Aviation Cross =

- Type: Military decoration
- Awarded for: "...for distinguished heroism or extraordinary achievement while participating in aerial operations"
- Country: Philippines
- Presented by: the Armed Forces of the Philippines
- Eligibility: Military personnel of the AFP who are serving in any capacity with the Philippine Air Force, or with the air components of the Army, or the Navy
- Status: Currently Awarded
- Distinguished Aviation Cross ribbon bar

Precedence
- Next (higher): Gold Cross
- Equivalent: Distinguished Navy Cross (Philippine Navy)
- Next (lower): Silver Cross

The Distinguished Aviation Cross (DAC) is a military decoration of the Armed Forces of the Philippines. It is presented for heroism or achievement during aerial operations.

== Criteria ==
The cross is awarded to personnel of the Armed Forces of the Philippines who are serving with the Philippine Air Force or with the air components of the Philippine Army (e.g. the Army Aviation Regiment "Hiraya") or Philippine Navy (e.g. the Air Warfare Force, PN). The cross recognizes voluntary acts in the presence of significant danger, which go above and beyond the call of duty. The accomplishment must be of an exceptional and outstanding nature, as to set him apart from the recipient's comrades.

== Appearance ==
=== Obverse ===
The medal, golden in color, consists of various intertwined elements. A four-bladed aircraft propeller sits on a Maltese cross. The propeller-cross combo, in turn, sits on an eight-rayed sun reminiscent to the one depicted in the Philippine flag. All these now sit on an equilateral diamond.

Face value-wise, it has a resemblance to the American Distinguished Flying Cross.

=== Reverse ===
The words "DISTINGUISHED" and "AVIATION CROSS" are written at the back of the medal in two lines, respectively.

=== Symbolism and Significance ===
Propeller - aviation, and aerial flight

Maltese cross - the risk of life displayed in the face of the enemy; accomplishment of an extraordinary achievement while in aerial flight

Sun - the deed for the good of the nation (i.e. the Philippines)

Diamond - the aerial formation of a flight of planes

=== Service Ribbon ===
The cross is suspended from a blue ribbon with white edges. It has a red central stripe edged in gold.

=== Appurtenances ===
Every subsequent award of the DAC to an individual shall be appurtenant with an Anahaw Leaf, and is awarded as follows:

- Bronze Anahaw Leaf - for the first, second, third, and fourth succeeding award
- Silver Anahaw Leaf - for every fifth succeeding Bronze Anahaw Leaf
- Gold Anahaw Leaf - for every fifth Silver Anahaw Leaf

These devices are to be worn on the DAC's ribbon bar in dress uniforms, with the tips of the leaf pointed upward.

== See also ==
- Awards and decorations of the Armed Forces of the Philippines
