= Philippine Air Force Reserve Command =

Air Force Reserve Command
- Pangasiwaan ng Panlaang Kawal ng Hukbong Panghimpapawid
- Active: October 1, 1986 - Present
- Country: Philippines
- Allegiance: Republic of the Philippines
- Branch: Philippine Air Force
- Type: Reserve Force
- Role: Conventional and Unconventional Warfare; Anti-Guerrilla Operations; Combat Support & Service Support; Force Multiplier; Training; Disaster Rescue & Relief; Community Service
- Size: 120,000+ in Ready Reserve Status, 50,000+ in Standby Reserve Status
- Part of: Under the Philippine Air Force
- Garrison/HQ: Villamor Air Base, Pasay, NCR; Air Force City, Clark Airbase, Pampanga
- Nicknames: AIR RESCOM; RESCOM, PAF; AFRC
- Motto: Handa sa Tawag ng Inang Bayan ("Ready to heed the call of the Motherland")
- Colors: Air Force Blue, White
- Anniversaries: October 1
- Decorations: Philippine Republic Presidential Unit Citation Badge

Commanders
- Current commander: MGEN Ronie D Petinglay, PAF

Insignia
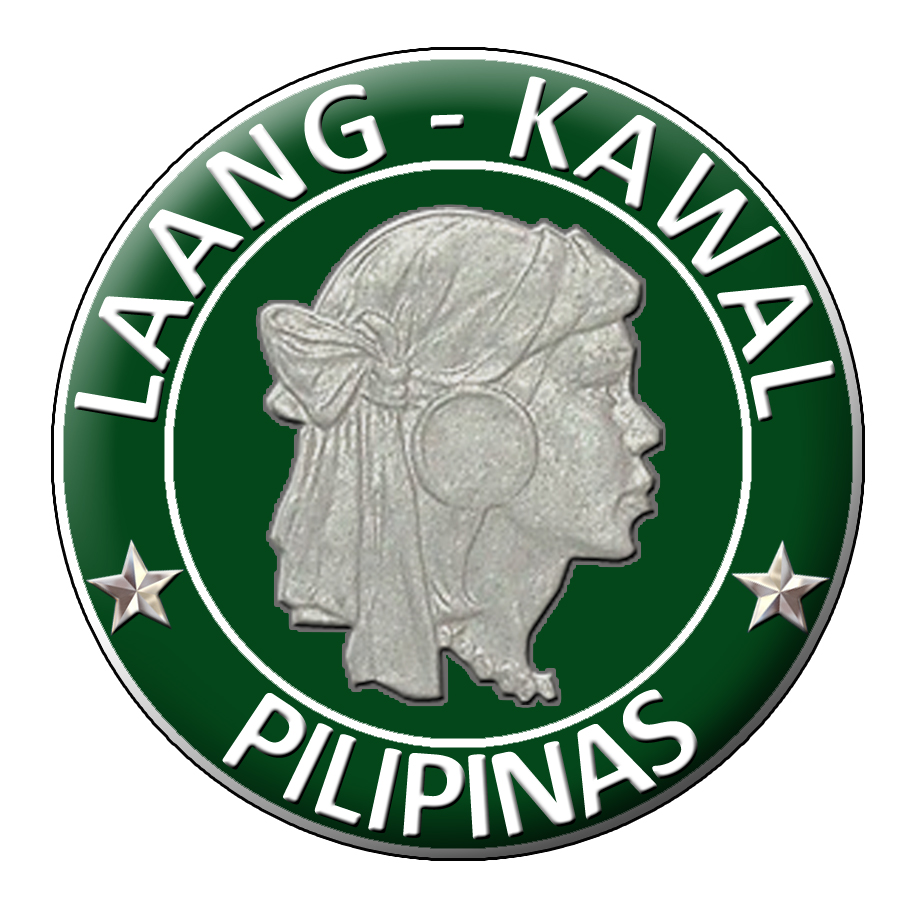
- AFP Reserve Force Shoulder Sleeve Insignia

The Air Force Reserve Command (Filipino: Pangasiwaan ng Panlaang Kawal ng Hukbong Panghimpapawid), also known through its acronyms AFRC, AIR RESCOM, or RESCOM, PAF, is one of the Philippine Air Force's Major Support Commands created for the sole purpose of Reserve Force management, procurement, and organization.

== Legal Mandate ==
=== Commonwealth Act 1 ===
Commonwealth Act No. 1, particularly Section II, cites the responsibility of each and every citizen of for the defense of the nation. Citizens may be mobilized in the event the national government declares an act of war or emergency.

=== Republic Act 7077 ===
Republic Act No. 7077, also known as the Citizen's Armed Force Act or Reservist Law of 1991, is an act passed in to law by the joint house of representatives which clearly provides the policies and procedures in the creation and administration of reservists and reserve units of the Armed Forces of the Philippines.

=== Republic Act 9163 ===
Republic Act No. 9163, also known as the National Service Training Program Act or National Service Law of 2001, defines the policies and procedures in administration/training of ROTC Units in relation to the other two components, Civic Welfare Training Service (CWTS) and Literacy Training Service (LTS), of the National Service Training Program (NSTP).

== Training ==
Training is one of the primary tasks that is handled by the AFRC. The three primary sources of Air Force Reservists (Filipino: Laang Kawal Panghimpapawid) are:

- Air Force Reserve Officer Training Corps (AFROTC) - given to tertiary-level students who voluntarily signed for ROTC under the National Service Training Program (NSTP),
- Basic Citizen's Military Course (BCMC) - for civilians from all professions who did not take ROTC, and would want to become a part of the AFP Reserve Force on top of being corporate professionals, and
- Military Orientation Training (MOT) - for volunteer employees of private or public organizations of utility service providers assigned as a Philippine Air Force Affiliated Reserve Unit (PAF ARU)

AFRC, also through its ROTC Program, prepares future officers in the Air Force serving in the reserve force.

== Types of Air Force Reservists ==
There are currently three types of reservists in the Armed Forces of the Philippines (AFP) Reserve Force:

=== Categorization of Reservists and Reserve Units ===
Section 12, Article 5, of Republic Act 7077 breaks down and categorizes reservists and their units based on various criteria cited by this law.

- First Category Reservists - Able bodied Reservists aged 18 up to 35 years of age, inclusive.
- Second Category Reservists - Able bodied Reservists aged 36 up to 51 years of age, inclusive.
- Third Category Reservists - All able-bodied Reservists aged above 52 years of age.

=== Classification of Reservists and Reserve Units ===
Section 13, Article 5, of Republic Act 7077 clearly cites the classification of reservists based on their operational readiness for immediate deployment or mobilization.

- Ready Reserve - physically fit and tactically current reservist personnel that are always on constant alert and training; ready to mobilize once a mobilization order has been given. Reservists who belong to/work for a PAF ARU is also classified under the Ready Reserve.
- Standby Reserve - Reservists who do not maintain currency in specialization qualifications but the base for expansion, support and augmentation to the Ready Reserve Force as needed.
- Retired Reserve - composed of citizens who are qualified for retirement either by length of service or age.

== Lineage of commanding officers ==
Tenure begin	Tenure end	Rank	Name
		COL	Rodolfo C Abad, (GSC) PAF
		COL	Ferdinand B Donesa, (GSC) PAF
		COL	Josefino B Gabor, (GSC) PAF
		COL	Domingo A Rodriguez, (GSC) PAF
		COL	Pablo C Doble, (GSC) PAF
		BGEN	Rogelio T Estacio, (GSC) AFP
		COL	Ramon C Fabie, (GSC) PAF
		COL	Elias M Sta. Clara, (GSC) PAF
		COL	Rolando Y Espejo, (GSC) PAF
		BGEN	Antonio V Rustia, AFP
		COL	Virgilio E Calip, (GSC) PAF
		COL	Jose C Bautista, Jr., (GSC) PAF
		BGEN	Jose V Balajadia, Jr., AFP
		BGEN	Adelberto F Yap, AFP
		BGEN	Nilo C Jatico, AFP
		COL	Roberto L Ricalde, (GSC) PAF
		BGEN	Orlando B Yabut, AFP
		BGEN	Reulucio G Samaco, AFP
		BGEN	Lino Horacio E Lapinid, AFP
		BGEN	Alejandro T Camagay, AFP
		BGEN	Danilo M Ferrer, AFP
		BGEN	Ramiro Busalanan, AFP
		BGEN	William P Turalde, AFP
		BGEN	Raymund DV Elefante, AFP
		BGEN	Enrico L Ignacio, AFP
		BGEN	Ernesto C Milo, AFP
		BGEN	Francisco V Carada, PAF
		BGEN	Rolando S Acop, PAF
		MGEN	Connor Anthony Canlas Sr., PAF
		MGEN	Arthur M Cordura, PAF
		MGEN	Edward L Libago, PAF (GSC)
		COL	Leodigario V Macalintal, MNSA, PAF (acting)
	16 Feb 2023	MGEN	Ramon J Guiang, PAF
16 Feb 2023	19 Sep 2024	MGEN	Elpidio B Talja, PAF
19 Sep 2024	31 Jan 2026	MGEN	Pablo E Rustria, Jr., PAF
31 Jan 2026	present	MGEN	Ronie D Petinglay, PAF

== Organization ==
=== Line units ===
- 1st Air Reserve Center (1ARCEN) - Villamor Air Base, Pasay
- 2nd Air Reserve Center (2ARCEN) - Clark Air Base, Angeles City, Pampanga
- 3rd Air Reserve Center (3ARCEN) - Fernando Air Base, Lipa City, Batangas
- 4th Air Reserve Center (4ARCEN) - Antonio Bautista Air Base, Puerto Princesa City, Palawan
- 5th Air Reserve Center (5ARCEN) - Benito N Ebuen Air Base, Cebu
- 6th Air Reserve Center (6ARCEN) - Edwin Andrews Air Base, Santa Maria, Zamboanga City
- 7th Air Reserve Center (7ARCEN) - Davao Air Station, Davao City
- 8th Air Reserve Center (8ARCEN) - Colonel Godofredo Juliano Air Base, Lumbia, Cagayan de Oro City

=== Reserve Air Wings ===
- Air Base Wing Reserve (ABWR) - Villamor Air Base, Pasay
- Tactical Operations Wing Reserve – Northern Luzon (TOWR-NOL) - Clark Air Base, Mabalacat City, Pampanga
- Tactical Operations Wing Reserve – Southern Luzon (TOWR-SOL) - Basilio Fernando Air Base, Lipa City, Batangas
- Tactical Operations Wing Reserve – Western Command (TOWR-WesCom) - Antonio Bautista Air Base, Puerto Princesa City, Palawan
- Tactical Operations Wing Reserve – Central (TOWR-CEN)- BGen Benito N Ebuen Air Base
- Tactical Operations Wing Reserve – Western Mindanao Command (TOWR-WestMinCom) - Edwin Andrews Air Base, Santa Maria, Zamboanga City
- Tactical Operations Wing Reserve – Eastern Mindanao Command (TOWR-EastMinCom) - Davao Air Station, Old Airport, Sasa, Davao City

=== Reserve Air Groups ===
- 11th Air Force Group Reserve - Villamor Air Base, Pasay
    - 1101st Advance Command Post (Malabon City).
    - 1102nd Advance Command Post (Navotas City).
    - 1103rd Advance Command Post(Caloocan City).
    - 1104th Advance Command Post (Valenzuela City).
    - 1121st Advance Command Post (Greater Lagro).
    - 1122nd Advance Command Post (QC City Hall).
    - 1131st Advance Command Post( Marikina City).
- 12th Air Force Group Reserve - Villamor Air Base, Pasay
    - 121st Airlift Squadron (Res)
    - 122nd Search and Rescue Squadron (Res)
    - 123rd Motor Vehicle Squadron (Res)
    - 124th Civil Engineering Squadron (Res)
    - 125th Air Police Squadron (Res)
    - 126th Aeromedical Squadron (Res)
- 13th Air Force Group Reserve - Villamor Air Base, Pasay
  - 131st Airlift Squadron (Res)
  - 132nd Search and Rescue Squadron (Res)
  - 133rd Motor Vehicle Squadron (Res)
  - 134th Civil Engineering Squadron (Res)
  - 135th Air Police Squadron (Res)
  - 136th Aeromedical Squadron (Res)
- 21st Air Force Group Reserve - Baguio Airport, Baguio, Benguet
- 22nd Air Force Group Reserve - TOG 2, Cauayan, Isabela
- 23rd Air Force Group Reserve - Cesar Basa Air Base, Floridablanca, Pampanga
    - 231st Airlift Squadron Reserve
    - 232nd Search and Rescue Squadron Reserve
    - 233rd Motor Vehicle Squadron Reserve
    - 234th Civil Engineering Squadron Reserve
    - 235th Air Police Squadron Reserve
    - 236th Aeromedical Squadron Reserve

=== Department of Air Science and Tactics (DAST) Groups (PAF ROTC Units) ===
- 131st DAST – Ateneo de Manila University (ADMU), Quezon City
- 133rd DAST – National Aviation Academy of the Philippines, Pasay City
- 134th DAST – PATTS College of Aeronautics, Parañaque City
- 136th DAST – University of Perpetual Help System DALTA (UPHSD) – Las Piñas Campus
- 236th DAST – Systems Plus College Foundation (SPCF), Pampanga
- 238th DAST - First City Providential College (FCPC), San Jose del Monte, Bulacan
- 243rd DAST – University of the Cordilleras, Baguio City
- 321st DAST - Philippines State College of Aeronautics - Fernando Air Base (PhilSCA-FAB) – FAB-Lipa Campus
- 323rd DAST - Alpha Centauri Educational System (ACES), Lucena City, Quezon
- 324th DAST - University of Perpetual Help System DALTA (UPHSD) – Calamba Campus
- 328th DAST - San Francisco Institute of Science and Technology, Malilipot, Albay
- 521st DAST - Indiana Aerospace University (IAU), Mactan City, Cebu
- 525th DAST – Bago City College, Negros Occidental
- 526th DAST – West Visayas State University (WVSU)
- 527th DAST – Eastern Visayas State University (EVSU)
- 528th DAST – Negros Oriental State University (NORSU)
- 621st DAST - Mindanao State University-Sulu
- 624th DAST - Southern City College, Zamboanga del Sur
- 735th DAST - Kapalong College of Agriculture, Science, and Technology (KCAST), Davao del Norte
- 801st DAST – Xavier University - Ateneo de Cagayan

=== Philippine Air Force Affiliated Reserve Units (PAF ARUs) ===
- 1st Airlift Wing (Reserve) (AirAsia Philippines)
- 1st Air Education and Training Group (Reserve) (Philippine State College of Aeronautics)
- 1st Intelligence Security Wing (Reserve) (Bureau of Immigration)
- 120th Air Intelligence, Surveillance and Reconnaissance Group (Reserve) (Leading Edge International Aviation Academy, Inc.)
- 120th PAFARU Health Services (Reserve) (AUF Medical Center, Angeles City)
- 123rd PAFARU (RG Meditron, Inc.)
- 124th PAFARU (Philippine EAGLECOM Society Inc.)
- 128th Fire Crash and Rescue Group (Reserve) (Association of Volunteer Fire Chiefs and Firefighters of the Philippines Inc.)
- 500th Search and Rescue Group (Reserve) (RESCUE 5)
- 1110th Air Reconnaissance Squadron (Reserve) (Asian International School of Aeronautics and Technology, Davao City)
- 1130th Services Squadron (Reserve) (Puerto Princesa City Water District)
- 2201st Reserve Pilot Training Squadron (Masters Flying School, Quezon City)
- 2320th Philippine Air Force Affiliated Group (Reserve) (Clark Development Corporation)

=== Restructuring of the Philippine Air Force Reserve Force 2025 ===
In 2026, the PAF reorganized its reserve force as part of its implementation of the Total Defense Force development concept. The restructuring was intended to align the organization of PAF reserve units more closely with the structure and operational capabilities of their regular (i.e. active duty) counterparts. The restructuring involved the deactivation of seven former Air Force Wing Reserve (AFWR) units and the activation or redesignation of seven reserve wings.

The newly organized reserve wings are:

Former unit	Reorganized unit
1st AFWR	Air Base Wing Reserve (ABWR)
2nd AFWR	Tactical Operations Wing Reserve – Northern Luzon (TOWR-NOL)
3rd AFWR	Tactical Operations Wing Reserve – Southern Luzon (TOWR-SOL)
4th AFWR	Tactical Operations Wing Reserve – Western Command (TOWR-WesCom)
5th AFWR	Tactical Operations Wing Reserve – Central (TOWR-CEN)
6th AFWR	Tactical Operations Wing Reserve – Western Mindanao Command (TOWR-WestMinCom)
7th AFWR	Tactical Operations Wing Reserve – Eastern Mindanao Command (TOWR-EastMinCom)

== Prominent Filipino Air Force Reservists ==
- COL Gilberto Eduardo Gregorio C. Teodoro, Jr., PAF(Res) - Secretary, Department of National Defense, Arroyo and Marcos Jr. administrations; former Representative, 1st District, Tarlac; licensed commercial pilot
- LTC Rosa Vilma T. Santos-Recto, PAF(Res) - actress; former Governor, Batangas
- MAJ Jose Antonio S. Leviste II, PAF(Res) - former Vice Governor, Batangas
- MAJ Pircelyn "Celine" B. Pialago, PAF(Res) - former spokesperson, Metropolitan Manila Development Authority, and the Land Transportation Franchising and Regulatory Board; candidate Miss Philippines Earth 2014 (Dalaguete, Cebu)
- 2LT Hidilyn F. Diaz-Naranjo, PAF(Res) - first Filipino Olympic gold medalist (women's 55 kg, weightlifting), 2020 Summer Olympics
- SGT Coleen Nicole "Coleen Perez" L. Bergonia, PAF(Res) - actress
- SGT David John U. Chua, PAF(Res) - actor, director
- SGT Geneva M. Cruz, PAF(Res) - actress, lead vocalist, Smokey Mountain
- SGT Michelle Daniela M. Dee, PAF(Res) - winner, Miss Universe Philippines 2023; Top 10, Miss Universe 2023
- SGT John Vic O. de Guzman, PAF(Res) - actor; silver medalist (men's volleyball), 2019 Southeast Asian Games
- SGT Juan Miguel G. de Guzman, PAF(Res) - actor, mixed martial artist
- SGT Jason Joseph Francis Carlos D. Ejercito, PAF(Res) - actor; son of Gary Estrada
- SGT Edward Jake L. Falcon, PAF(Res) - actor; Big Winner, Pinoy Big Brother: Teen Edition Plus; former Vice Governor, Oriental Mindoro
- SGT María Rosario N. Santos-Concio, PAF(Res) - actress, host, Maalaala Mo Kaya; former President, ABS-CBN Corporation
- SGT Eumir Felix D. Marcial, PAF(Res) - Olympic bronze medalist (middleweight), 2020 Summer Olympics
- SGT Ramona Cecilia D. Muñoz, PAF(Res) - actress
- SGT Maria Julia A. Valdez, PAF(Res) - actress; granddaughter of National Artist for Painting Fernando Amorsolo

== Ranks of Air Force personnel ==
=== Officers ===
Air Force rank (pay grade) Abbreviation	General Office Attire (GOA) shoulder rank insignia	Philippine Air Force Battle Dress Uniform (PhilAirPat) chest insignia
General (O-10) GEN		
Lieutenant General (O-9) LTGEN		
Major General (O-8) MGEN		
Brigadier General (O-7) BGEN		
Colonel (O-6) COL		
Lieutenant Colonel (O-5) LTC		
Major (O-4) MAJ		
Captain (O-3) CPT		
First Lieutenant (O-2) 1LT		
Second Lieutenant (O-1) 2LT		

=== Enlisted Personnel, and Non-Commissioned Officers ===
Air Force rank (pay grade) Abbreviation	General Office Attire (GOA) sleeve rank insignia	Philippine Air Force Battle Dress Uniform (PhilAirPat) chest insignia
Chief Master Sergeant (E-9) CMSGT		
Senior Master Sergeant (E-8) SMSG		
Master Sergeant (E-7) MSG		
Technical Sergeant (E-6) TSG		
Staff Sergeant (E-5) SSG		
Sergeant (E-4) SGT		
Airman/Airwoman First Class (E-3) A1C		
Airman/Airwoman Second Class (E-2) A2C		
Airman/Airwoman (E-1) AM/AW		

== Awards and decorations ==
=== Campaign streamers ===
Award Streamer	Streamer Name	Operation	Date Awarded	Reference
	Presidential Unit Citation Badge	SAR/DRR Ops, TS Ketsana & TS Parma	February 4, 2010	General Orders No. 112, GHQ-AFP, dtd Feb 4 '10
	Presidential Unit Citation Badge	General Elections, Philippines	July 1, 2010	General Orders No. 641, GHQ-AFP, dtd July 1 '10

=== Badges ===
Military Badge	Badge Name	Operation	Date Awarded	Reference
	AFP Election Duty Badge	General Elections, Philippines	May 21, 2010	General Orders No. 513, GHQ-AFP, dtd May 21 '10

== See also ==
- Armed Forces of the Philippines Reserve Command
- Philippine Army Reserve Command
- Philippine Navy Reserve Command
- Philippine Coast Guard Auxiliary
