= Military Merit Medal (Philippines) =

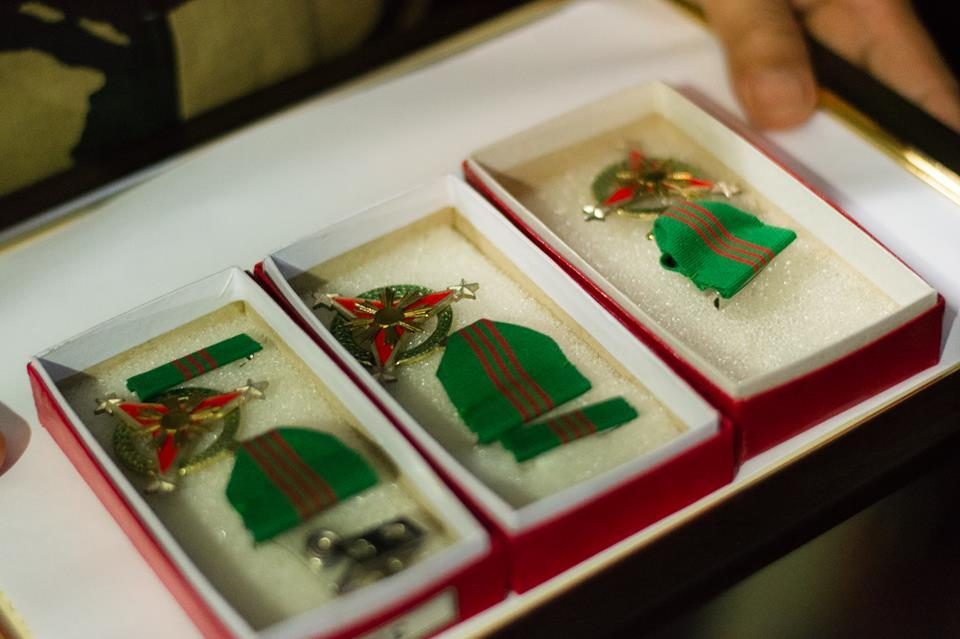
- A tray of three Military Merit Medals
- Type: Military decoration
- Awarded for: Meritorious service during or in support of military action.
- Country: Philippines
- Presented by: the Armed Forces of the Philippines
- Eligibility: Military personnel of the Armed Forces of the Philippines
- Status: Currently Awarded
- Established: 1946
- First award: 1946 (retroactive to December 8, 1941)
- Military Merit Medal ribbon bar

Precedence
- Next (higher): Bronze Cross Medal
- Next (lower): Silver Wing Medal

The Military Merit Medal (MMM) is a military decoration of the Armed Forces of the Philippines, awarded for heroic achievement or meritorious service during, or in support of military action against an enemy.

Instituted in 1946, the MMM is considered as one of the first awards uniquely created for the military forces of the newly independent Philippine nation, as other military awards (such as the Medal of Valor, the Distinguished Conduct Star, and the Distinguished Service Star) were created during the Insular, and Commonwealth eras.

== Requirements ==
For a military service personnel member to be eligible for the MMM, they must have:

- heroic or meritorious achievement for service not involving participation in combat, in connection with military operations against an enemy of the Philippines (the required achievement is less than that which is required for the awarding of the Distinguished Service Star)
- a single act of meritorious service either in a duty responsibility, or in direct support of military operations

The cited achievement or service is to be accomplished with distinction.

It may also be awarded posthumously to members of the AFP who are killed in action by an enemy after having performed meritorious service to the AFP in any capacity.

=== Interim Award of Lesser Category ===
The MMM is one of the two awards explicitly identified by the AFP as an "interim award of lesser category" (the other being the Distinguished Service Star), which means that a recipient who is under review of being recommended for the conferment of the Gold Cross (or lower) shall be given an MMM ad interim and shall be cancelled once the higher award had been approved for conferment.

== Description ==
=== Obverse ===
The MMM is composed of a silver-plated equilateral triangle pointed downward, enameled in red, and bordered in silver; a gold star is attached to each vertex (i.e. point) of the triangle. At the center of the triangle is the sun found in the flag of the Philippines in gold with eight pointed rays. A green laurel wreath passes around and behind the triangle and is visible between each of the points.

=== Reverse ===
In a golden ring opposite the wreath, the phrase "FOR MILITARY MERIT" is written in an arc.

=== Symbolism and Significance ===
Sun - the Philippines

Three stars - the three (3) major island groups of the Philippines

Wreath - the honor received for such display of acts and accomplishments warranting the MMM

=== Service Ribbon ===
The medal is suspended from a green ribbon with 3 central narrow red (i.e. crimson) stripes.

=== Appurtenances ===
Every subsequent award of the MMM to an individual shall be appurtenant with an Anahaw Leaf (for meritorious service), or a Spearhead Device (for heroic achievement), and are awarded as follows:

- Bronze Anahaw Leaf/Spearhead Device - for the first, second, third, and fourth succeeding award
- Silver Anahaw Leaf/Spearhead Device - for every fifth succeeding Bronze Anahaw Leaf/Spearhead Device
- Gold Anahaw Leaf/Spearhead Device - for every fifth Silver Anahaw Leaf/Spearhead Device

These devices are to be worn on the MMM's ribbon bar in dress uniforms, with the tips of the leaf and/or spearhead pointed upward.

It is to be noted that when a recipient possesses MMMs with both Spearhead Devices and Anahaw Leaves, they will be separately represented in their medal ribbon rack, as it highlights the nature of such appurtenances.

== See also ==
- Awards and decorations of the Armed Forces of the Philippines
