= Gold Cross (Philippines) =

Gold Cross Medal
- The AFP Gold Cross Medal
- Type: Decoration
- Awarded for: gallantry in action not warranting the award of the Distinguished Conduct Star
- Country: Philippines
- Presented by: Philippines
- Eligibility: members of the Armed Forces of the Philippines
- Motto: For Bravery
- Status: Currently awarded
- First award: post-World War II
- Service Ribbon

Precedence
- Next (higher): Distinguished Service Star
- Next (lower): Distinguished Aviation Cross; Distinguished Navy Cross

The Gold Cross Medal (GCM) is a decoration of the Armed Forces of the Philippines which recognizes gallantry in action.

== Requirements ==
It is the third highest military award of the Philippines for heroism, higher only to the Distinguished Aviation Cross (of the Philippine Air Force), and the Distinguished Navy Cross (of the Philippine Navy).

It is awarded by the Chief of Staff of the Armed Forces of the Philippines or other senior commanders, to members of the AFP for "singular personal acts of gallantry in action not warranting the award of the Distinguished Conduct Star" (the second highest military award in the AFP for heroism).

== Description ==
=== Obverse ===
The medal is a golden Maltese cross with grooved between each arm (i.e. flanges). At the center is a dark blue disc, with a left-facing golden profile of Philippine president Manuel L. Quezon. The disc is encircled by a laurel wreath of laurel leaves in gold, superimposed on the cross.

The medal is of similar appearance with the Distinguished Navy Cross, with the only difference being the profile of President Quezon is replaced with the seal of the Philippine Navy.

=== Reverse ===
In an arc, the phrase "FOR GALLANTRY IN ACTION" is written; the space inside the arc is reserved for the engraved name of the recipient.

=== Symbolism and Significance ===
Manuel L. Quezon - President of the Commonwealth of the Philippines (1935-1944); the achievement is worth a presidential endeavor

Navy blue background - sincerity and devotion to duty

Laurel wreath - the honor given for gallantry and courage displayed

Gold cross - the risk of life and sacrifices in rendering the conspicuous act/s warranting the GCM

Grooved border - brilliantly shining performance

=== Service Ribbon ===
The ribbon is cornflower in color and has three small white lines at the center.

They share the same ribbon as the aforementioned DNC.

=== Appurtenances ===
Every subsequent award of the GCM to an individual shall be appurtenant with an Anahaw Leaf, and is awarded as follows:

- Bronze Anahaw Leaf - for the first, second, third, and fourth succeeding award
- Silver Anahaw Leaf - for every fifth succeeding Bronze Anahaw Leaf
- Gold Anahaw Leaf - for every fifth Silver Anahaw Leaf

These devices are to be worn on the GCM's ribbon bar in dress uniforms, with the tips of the leaf pointed upward.

== The "Laughing Quezon" Gold Cross Medal ==
After the Second World War, the Philippine Heraldry Committee (led by Secretary Gilbert S. Perez) needed an award to honor the nation's war veterans, and the result was the Gold Cross (then known in official documents as the Quezon Cross; not to be confused with the Quezon Service Cross awarded to distinct Filipino citizens).

As factories around the Philippines were in ruins, they outsourced production of the medals to a Washington-based medal maker, A.M. Dondero. First strikes of the medal resulted in a right-facing profile of President Quezon in "a strange blend of Franklin D. Roosevelt and Abraham Lincoln", with an unsettling and "un-presidential" grin.

This resulted in a harsh critique by Secretary Perez of Dondero's work as "atrocious" and a "travesty of medallic art that is undignified and desecrates instead of honoring" the memory of the first Chief Executive of the Philippine Commonwealth.

The medal was never officially approved, never mass-produced, and never distributed in the Philippines. El Oro, a Pasig-based engraver owned by Jose Tupaz, Jr., was then given the authorization to produce GCMs locally.

A copy of the "laughing Quezon" GCM was auctioned at Leon Gallery in December 2025.

== See also ==
- Orders, decorations, and medals of the Philippines
