= Bronze Cross Medal =

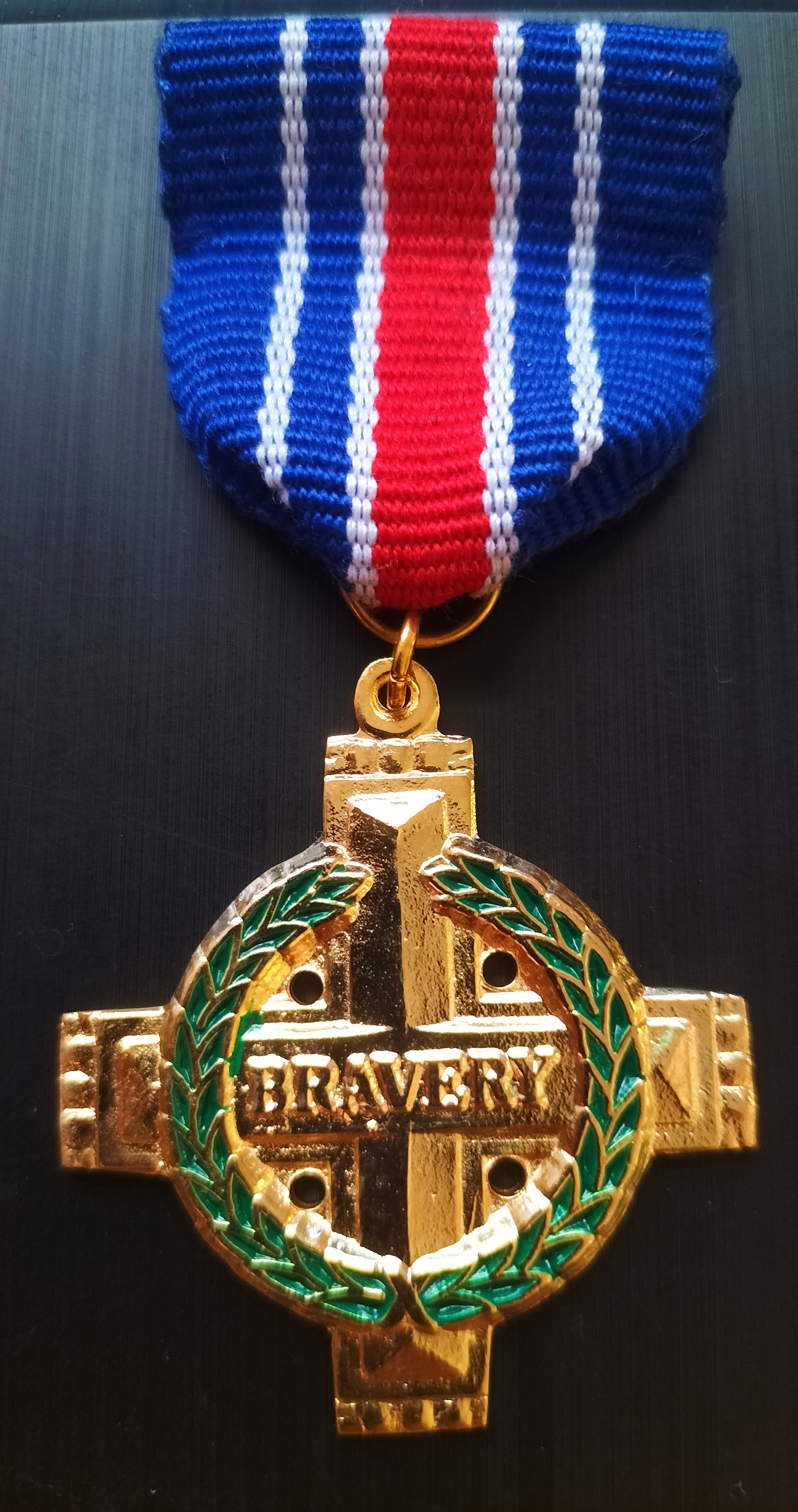
- Type: Military decoration
- Awarded for: Heroic actions involving risk of life, under conditions not warranting the Gold Cross Medal
- Country: Philippines
- Presented by: the Armed Forces of the Philippines
- Eligibility: Civilian and military personnel of the Armed Forces of the Philippines; Military personnel of nations allied with the Philippines
- Status: Currently Awarded
- Bronze Cross Medal ribbon bar

Precedence
- Next (higher): Silver Cross
- Next (lower): Silver Wing Medal

The Bronze Cross Medal (BCM) is a single grade military decoration of the Armed Forces of the Philippines which is awarded for "heroism involving risk of life" under conditions not warranting the award of the Gold Cross Medal.

== Requirements ==
Those eligible for the medal are military and civilian personnel of the AFP, who have shown:

- heroism not involving actual conflict with an enemy of the Philippines, or
- performance or acts of heroism involving risk of life under conditions other than those of conflict with the enemy (e.g. risk of life from saving another individual from drowning, a burning building, or a sinking ship)

Members of the armed forces of allied countries may also be honored by the award of the Bronze Cross Medal if they meet the aforementioned award criteria.

== Description ==
=== Obverse ===
The medal is a ridged gold Greek cross, with scrolls on each arms (i.e. flanges) of the cross. Centered over the cross is a green laurel wreath of two tendrils, each with 12 pairs of leaves, with one leaf at the tip of each tendril.

In the center, on the horizontal arms of the cross, is a golden bar engraved with the word “BRAVERY”.

The reverse of the BCM is plain.

=== Symbolism and Significance ===
Wreath - the honor which the awardee deserves for such act warranting the BCM

Cross - the risk of life and sacrifice displayed

=== Service Ribbon ===
The cross is suspended from a blue ribbon with a red central stripe edged in white and narrow white side stripes, halfway to the edges.

=== Appurtenances ===
Every subsequent award of the BCM to an individual shall be appurtenant with an Anahaw Leaf, and is awarded as follows:

- Bronze Anahaw Leaf - for the first, second, third, and fourth succeeding award
- Silver Anahaw Leaf - for every fifth succeeding Bronze Anahaw Leaf
- Gold Anahaw Leaf - for every fifth Silver Anahaw Leaf

These devices are to be worn on the BCM's ribbon bar in dress uniforms, with the tips of the leaf pointed upward.

== See also ==
- Awards and decorations of the Armed Forces of the Philippines
