= Silver Wing Medal =

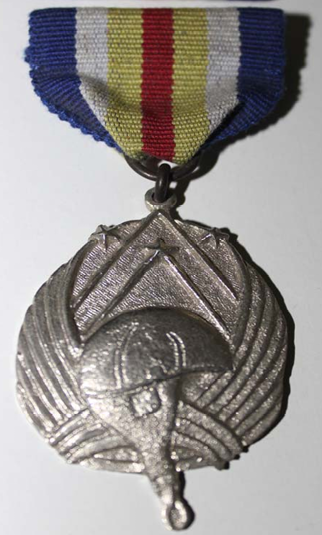
- The Silver Wing Medal
- Type: Medal
- Awarded for: Distinguished & Gallant Military Service while serving with the Philippine Air Force or Allied Airborne Units
- Presented by: the Republic of the Philippines
- Eligibility: Military Personnel
- Status: Currently Awarded
- Established: 1986
- First award: 1986
- Final award: Ongoing
- Ribbon bar

Precedence
- Next (higher): Bronze Cross Medal
- Next (lower): Military Merit Medal

This Silver Wing Medal (SWM) is a military decoration awarded by Armed Forces of the Philippines given to military personnel for "meritorious achievement while participating in aerial flight and a single act of merit or for participation in sustained operations activities against the enemy while in an aerial flight."

== Description ==
=== Obverse ===
The Silver Wing medal is made of silver colored metal, consisting of multiple elements. A pair of silver wings with seven feathers on each wing sweep from the bottom of the medal, nearly to the top. Between the tips of the two wings are three five-pointed stars in relief superimposed on two chevrons, one below the other.

Centering the wings is a combat helmet (i.e. paratrooper helmet) superimposed behind three arched bands at the base of the wings.

=== Reverse ===
The words "SILVER WING" and "MEDAL" are written at the reverse of the medal, in two lines, respectively.

=== Service Ribbon ===
The ribbon is white with a red central stripe bordered in yellow, then in white, and blue edges on each side.

=== Appurtenances ===
Every subsequent award of the SWM to an individual shall be appurtenant with an Anahaw Leaf, and is awarded as follows:

- Bronze Anahaw Leaf - for the first, second, third, and fourth succeeding award
- Silver Anahaw Leaf - for every fifth succeeding Bronze Anahaw Leaf
- Gold Anahaw Leaf - for every fifth Silver Anahaw Leaf

These devices are to be worn on the SWM's ribbon bar in dress uniforms, with the tips of the leaf pointed upward.

== See also ==
- Awards and decorations of the Armed Forces of the Philippines
