= Basilio Fernando Air Base =

Air base in Lipa, Philippines

- Lipa, Batangas

Site information
- Type: Military base
- Owner: Philippines
- Controlled by: Philippine Air Force
- Condition: active, as of 2026

Location
- Coordinates: 13°57′16″N 121°7′28″E

Site history
- Built: 1942
- Built by: Empire of Japan
- In use: 1942-present
- Events: Air Force Flying School; Technical Training Center; NCO Academy

Basilio Fernando Air Base
- IATA: none; ICAO: RPUL

Summary
- Airport type: Military
- Operator: Philippine Air Force
- Serves: Lipa
- Elevation AMSL: 366 m (1,201 ft)
- Coordinates: 13°57′16″N 121°7′28″E
- Website: paf.mil.ph

Map
- Location in the Philippines

Runways
| Direction | Length | | Surface |
| Direction | m | ft | Surface |
|---|---|---|---|
| 21/03 | 1 487 | 4 953 | Asphalt |

Basilio Fernando Air Base, or simply Fernando Air Base (formerly known as Lipa Air Base) is the site of the Philippine Air Force's (PAF) pilot training and education facilities located in the city of Lipa, Batangas, Philippines.

It is named after Lieutenant Colonel Basilio Fernando, one of the pioneers of Philippine aviation, who died during an airplane training accident in the US. It is also the location of PAF Air Education, Training, and doctrine Command of the Philippine Air Force.

Throughout the years, it has been awarded as the Philippine Air Force's Model Base of the Year for its well maintained appearance, base services, ecological and environmental control, and consistent safety and security control.

== Location ==
It is located in Lipa, Batangas, about 83 km SSE of Manila, Philippines. It is 1,220 feet (370 m) above sea level and is situated on a plateau overlooking Taal Volcano with an area of 712 acres (288 ha) of land which keep its climate temperature cool all day.

== History ==
The base was built by the U. S. Army prior to the Pacific War.

On December 22, 1941, the 27th Bombardment Group temporarily transferred its personnel to Lipa before departing on December 25 to Cabcaben Airfield.

During early 1942, it was occupied by elements of the Japanese Imperial Army 16th Division commanded by General Morioka. During the Japanese occupation, Lipa Airfield was repaired and expanded by the Japanese.

On 12 April 1948, President Manuel Roxas directed the renaming of Lipa Air Base to Fernando Field and subsequently, to Fernando Air Base in honor of Lt. Col. Basilio Fernando, one of the pioneers of Philippine aviation.

In 1952, Fernando Air Base became a training base called the 100th Training Wing where training units and other support units of the Philippine Air Force were grouped.

The base was used to train Philippine airmen. There were 3 different learning/training facilities on the base: The Air Force Flying School, the Technical Training Center, and the NCO Academy, which conducted continuing education for NCO's. These facilities were staffed with instructors from the 100th Training Wing until 22 September 1999, when the functions were subsumed by the Air Education and Training Command.

== Facilities ==
- Officers and enlisted Personnel club houses,
- Fernando Air Base chapel
- Fernando Air Base hospital
- Athletic Facilities
- 0.6 km Firing range
- Fernando Air Base 18-hole Golf Course

== Air Education, Training, and Doctrine Command ==
It is one of the Major Commands of the Philippine Air Force. On 21 September 1999, the 100th Training Wing was deactivated and the Air Education and Training Command was established with a greater responsibility and wider scope of training task. On 2018, the capability to develop doctrines has been given to the Command with the designation of the Air Warfare Center under the command and control of the Command. Subsequently, it was renamed Air Education, Training, and Doctrine Command (AETDC).

=== Primary Units ===
The command is composed of seven (6) primary schools namely:

- PAF Officer School (responsible for preparing officers to assume positions of higher responsibility.)
- PAF Basic Military School (responsible for training soldier candidates.)
- PAF Non-Commissioned Officer School (responsible for conducting career courses for Enlisted Personnel.)
- PAF Flying School (responsible for conducting flying training to aviation students to qualify as pilots of the Air Force.)
- PAF Officer Candidate School (responsible for training officer candidates.)
- PAF Technical and Specialization School (responsible for conducting technical courses for all Air Force personnel.)
- PAF Logistics Training Center (responsible for logistics related training) - located at Clark Air Base, Pampanga

It also houses PAF Aviation Leadership and Excellence Nexus responsible for developing PAF personnel at all levels to become leaders of character and excellence and the PAF Civilian Human Resource School responsible for professional education of PAF Civilian Human Resource.

=== Support units ===
Working with the primary units are four Support Units:

- 550th Air Base Group (its mission is to manage, operate and maintain base facilities and to provide support services and security throughout the base.)
- 440th Aircraft Maintenance Group (its mission is to perform, coordinate and supervise the operation of maintenance function.)
- Fernando Air Base Hospital (its mission is to provide hospitalization and outpatient services to military personnel, dependents and other authorized personnel.)
- 1303rd Dental Dispensary (its mission is to provide dental services to mil personnel, dependents and authorized civilians.)
