= Distinguished Service Star =

- Neck medal of the Distinguished Service Star
- Type: Decoration: neck medal
- Awarded for: Exceptional service in a position of responsibility
- Country: Philippines
- Presented by: the Chief of Staff of the Armed Forces of the Philippines
- Eligibility: Officers of the Armed Forces of the Philippines
- Motto: For Merit
- Status: Currently awarded
- Established: 1925 (as the Philippine Constabulary Meritorious Service Star) 1927 (as the Philippine Constabulary Distinguished Service Star) 1937 (as the Distinguished Service Star)
- First award: 1937 (current incarnation)
- Service Ribbon

Precedence
- Next (higher): Distinguished Conduct Star
- Next (lower): Gawad Sa Kapayapaan

The Distinguished Service Star (DSS) is the third highest military award of the Armed Forces of the Philippines. It is awarded to officers of the four major service branches of the AFP "for eminently meritorious and valuable service rendered while holding a position of great responsibility".

== History ==
The DSS was established on October 17, 1925, under Philippine Constabulary General Order 24, as the Philippine Constabulary Meritorious Service Star, initially as a decoration for Filipino and American personnel during the Insular era. Two year later, it was replaced with the Philippine Constabulary Distinguished Service Star. In 1937, under the Commonwealth era, it was simply named the Distinguished Service Star and was now awarded to regular Army personnel. This makes the DSS one of the oldest decorations in the Philippine military.

== Requirements ==
For an officer to receive the DSS, they must project "eminently meritorious and valuable service rendered while holding a position of great responsibility." In addition to this, the officer:

- must have a minimum of six months in the position,
- must belong to the upper 25% of commanders when compared to other commanders of the unit (for Command positions), and/or
- must have introduced major innovations and systems beneficial to the unit (for Staff positions)

In the context of this award, the service being attributed to the conferment is exceptional (i.e. not a superior performance of duties normal to the grade, branch, specialty of assignment and experience of the recipient; the "bare minimum").

The accomplishment of the service attributed to the conferment of the DSS should have been completed prior to submitting a recommendation, or if the recipient being recommended has been transferred (to another unit) prior to completion of said service. The accomplishment must have progressed to what may clearly be determined to be exceptional or significant. In case that the recipient is involved in a disreputable activity or a pending legal case, such shall not affect the achievement incurred warranting the conferment of the DSS. This scenario can be recognized for service awards, as honorable service is a criterion.

=== Interim award of lesser category ===
The DSS is one of the two awards explicitly identified by the AFP as an "interim award of lesser category" (the other being the Military Merit Medal), which means that a recipient who is under review of being recommended for the conferment of the Medal of Valor shall be given a DSS ad interim and shall be cancelled once the MOV had been approved for conferment.

== Description ==
Throughout its history, the award has undergone five design changes, leading to the current incarnation, used as an independent nation.

The medal for the DSS, as indicated by the name, is a five-pointed star. The star contains a central disc, displaying the coat of arms of the Philippines. Surmounting the seal is an arched golden scroll with the word "Merit." The star is attached to its ribbon by a Sampaguita wreath of twenty-six dark green leaves and ten white buds.

The DSS is conferred to the recipient as a neck medal, akin to other major decorations such as the Medal of Valor.

On the reverse, the phrase "FOR DISTINGUISHED SERVICE" is written in a circular pattern at the center portion of the star. A small star is situated at the bottom of the arched inscription.

The star represents outstanding achievements, while the scroll above the Philippine coat of arms signifies exceptionally meritorious and valuable services to the nation. The wreath embodies the honor associated with such accomplishments, justifying the award of the Distinguished Service Star (DSS).

The medal is suspended from a ribbon of dark blue, with a red vertical stripe in the center.

Every subsequent award of the DSS to an individual is accompanied with an Anahaw Leaf, which is awarded as follows:

- Bronze Anahaw Leaf - for the first, second, third, and fourth succeeding award
- Silver Anahaw Leaf - for every fifth succeeding Bronze Anahaw Leaf
- Gold Anahaw Leaf - for every fifth Silver Anahaw Leaf

These devices are to be worn on the DSS's ribbon bar in dress uniforms, with the tips of the leaf pointed upward.

== Notable recipients ==
- GEN Douglas MacArthur, USA - commander, United States Army Forces Far East (USAFFE) during the Second World War; conferred by President Quezon on February 20, 1942, for his service and commitment to the Philippines "as one of the greatest heritages of the Filipino people."
