= Gilbert Gapay =

Filipino general

General Gilbert I. Gapay PA
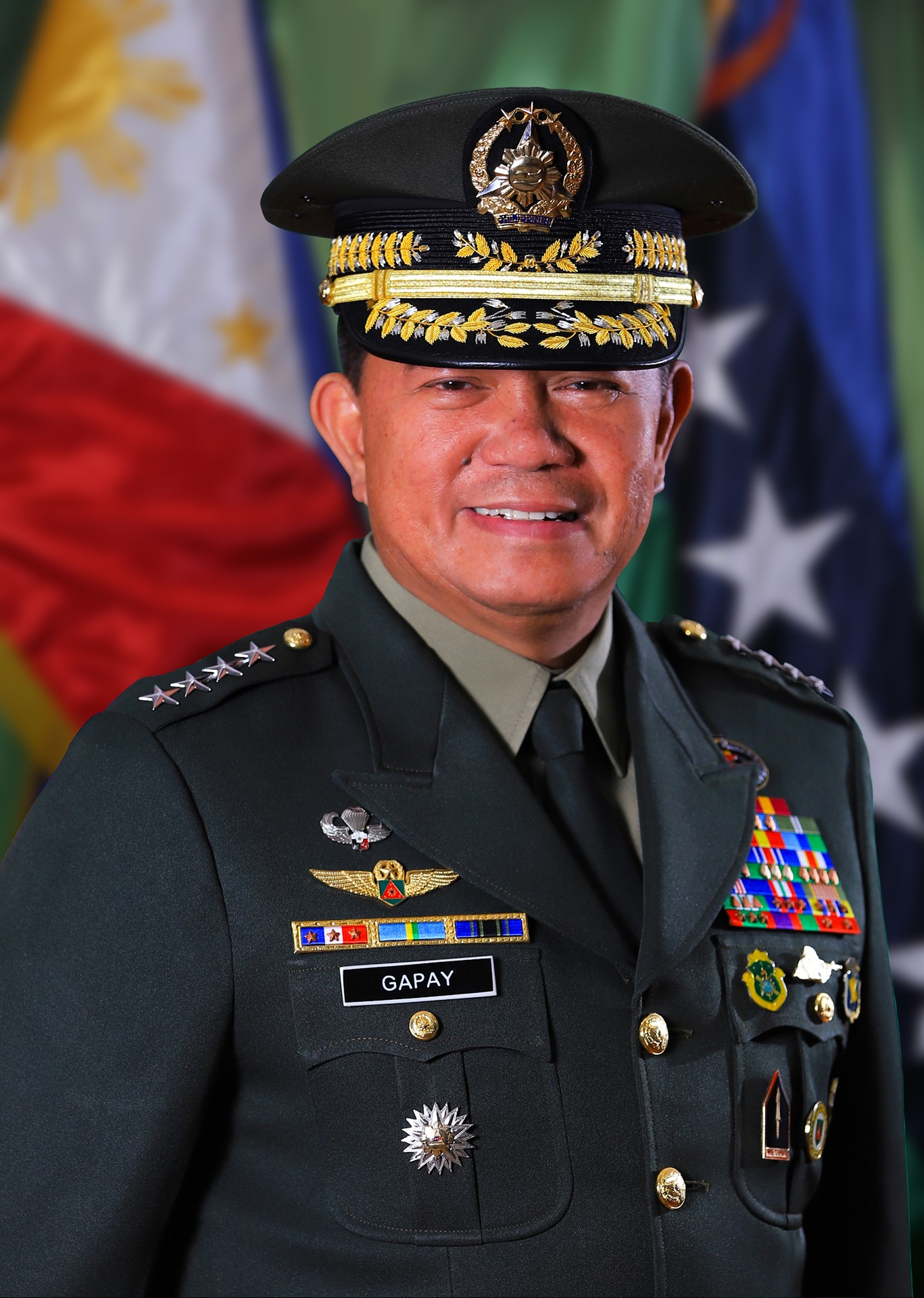
- Official portrait, 2021

54th Chief of Staff of the Armed Forces of the Philippines
- In office 3 August 2020 – 4 February 2021
- President: Rodrigo Duterte
- Preceded by: Gen. Felimon Santos Jr.
- Succeeded by: Gen. Cirilito E. Sobejana

Chief of the Philippine Army
- In office 6 December 2019 – 3 August 2020
- President: Rodrigo Duterte
- Preceded by: Lt.Gen. Macairog Alberto
- Succeeded by: Lt.Gen. Cirilito Sobejana

Personal details
- Born: Gilbert Italia Gapay; February 4, 1965 La Paz, Tarlac, Philippines
- Died: November 3, 2026 (aged 61)
- Education: Philippine Military Academy; Philippine Christian University, (MiM)
- Awards: Distinguished Service Stars; Legionnaire, Philippine Legion of Honor; Gold Cross Medals; Military Merit Medals
- Nickname: Heneral Gilbert

Military service
- Allegiance: Philippines
- Branch/service: Philippine Army
- Years of service: 1986-2021
- Rank: General
- Unit: Chairman of the Joint Chiefs; Chief of the Philippine Army; AFP Southern Luzon Command; Armor Division; Joint Task Force Haribon; 3rd Mechanized Infantry Battalion, LAD; 52nd Mechanized Infantry Company, PALAR; 23rd Light Armor Company, PALAR
- Battles/wars: Communist rebellion in the Philippines; Moro conflict Battle of Camp Abubakar

Gilbert Italia Gapay (February 4, 1965 - November 3, 2026) was a retired Philippine Army general who served as the 54th Chief of Staff of the Armed Forces of the Philippines. Prior to his appointment, he served as the 61st Chief of the Army and the commander of the Armor "Pambato" Division.

== Early life and education ==
He was born at La Paz, Tarlac on February 4, 1965, and finished high school at the Ateneo de Manila University (ADMU). He initially entered the Philippine Military Academy (PMA) in 1981, but was subsequently rejected due to being under-aged. He spent a year at the ADMU studying Bachelor of Business Management, before he successfully entered the PMA in 1982 and is a member of the Sinagtala Class of 1986. He graduated at the top of his class (Class Valedictorian), and was awarded 13 awards during his graduation in the military academy, making him the most decorated cadet in the history of the PMA. A record tied to Cadet Eckwood Solomon of Florida, USA, who also graduated in the PMA in 1963 and received 13 awards. Solomon was killed in action (KIA) in Vietnam in 1966 as a young lieutenant in a mine-clearing operation during the Vietnam War.

He is known to be a bright, articulate and a man of action due to his academic achievements. He also completed various training and activities locally and abroad, such as the Scout Ranger Orientation Course, the Basic Aviators Course, Armor Officer Basic Course; the Air Traffic Control Officer Course at the Air University, the Comptroller Officer Basic Course; the Armor Officer Advance Course and Command and General Staff Course at the Armed Forces of the Philippines Command and General Staff College, the Emergency Management Seminar with the Australian Defence Force in Australia, and the Chemical, Biological, Radioactive, and Nuclear (CBRN) Training Seminar at the Canadian Nuclear Safety Commission in Canada. He also holds a Master of Management at the Philippine Christian University in Manila.

== Military career ==
He began his career in the 26th Infantry Battalion, of the 4th Infantry Division, and also led troops during communist insurgents in 1988 at the Agusan Provinces. He also led the 52nd Mechanized Infantry Company of the Light Armor Brigade during the Battle of Camp Abubakar as part of the "All Out War" Operations against the MILF in 2000. He also led the 3rd Mechanized Infantry Battalion on combating communist insurgents in Central Luzon.

He was also a member of a team of AFP Officers under then-AFP Chief General Emmanuel T. Bautista, where he helped conceptualize the Internal Peace and Security Plan "Bayanihan Operations" concept (ISSP), where he made major contributions on combating counterinsurgency through local dialogues, and creating more peaceful communities that allows the AFP and former rebels contribute to the overall local development in the country. He also applied the ISSP Doctrine against communist groups due to the creation of the National Task Force to End Local Communist Armed Conflict.

He commanded various units in the Philippine Army and other AFP units deployed in major areas in Luzon and in Mindanao, primarily specialized in infantry and mechanized cavalry operations. He also led diverse units and was assigned to different areas in the AFP, such as in intelligence, education and training, civil and military operations and joint operations. He became deputy commander of the Eastern Mindanao Command (EastMinCom), based in Davao City; commander of Joint Task Force Haribon which secured Davao City and the rest of Davao region during the 2016 Davao City bombing, and also became the military spokesperson of the martial law implementation in Mindanao. He also served as the Chief of Staff of the Philippine Army in 2016, where he earned his second star (Major General), and commanded the Armor “Pambato” Division (formerly the Mechanized Infantry Division) in 2017. As commander of the Armor Division, he spearheaded the modernization of the army's armor and aviation units, and laid out future acquisition programs for the army's new assets, such as the conversion of 5 M113A2 APCs to self-propelled mortar systems equipped with the Cardom system, and the procurement of the army's Elbit UAVs, and upcoming armor and aviation assets.

He became commander of the Southern Luzon Command (SoLCom) in January 2019, where he earned his third star (Lieutenant General).He was also responsible in the successful launching of the Philippine chairmanship of the ASEAN in Davao City and the successful conduct of high-level ASEAN meetings and major international events. Noteworthy was the “zero incident” of terrorism during his tenure. He also oversaw the 2019 Balikatan exercises as the country's exercise director.

On December 6, 2019, he was named as the new Commanding General of the Philippine Army, where he replaced his classmate, Lieutenant General Macairog Alberto, after reaching his mandatory retirement age at 56. As Chief of the Philippine Army, he oversaw all army operations amidst the COVID-19 pandemic and spearheaded the army's modernization programs, which delayed and limited the other acquisition programs that were laid out by the Army. Nevertheless, the Army still procured new and modern assets that is set to upgrade the army's capabilities, such as the GDELS ASCOD Sabrah light tanks, which also includes an armored command vehicle, and an armored recovery vehicle; the Excalibur Army Pandur II tank destroyers and command vehicles, and the Iveco VBTP APCS.

On July 29, 2020, he was named as the new Chairman of the Joint Chiefs, the highest post in the AFP, and took helm on his post on August 3, 2020, replacing his classmate Felimon Santos Jr. Gapay is the 54th AFP Chief of Staff, and the 8th under Duterte's administration since 2016. He earned his fourth star, and was promoted to the rank of General on October 7, 2020. He retired from military service on February 4, 2021, after reaching the mandatory military retirement age of 56. He was replaced by the Chief of the Philippine Army and Medal of Valor awardee, Lieutenant General Cirilito Sobejana.

== Awards and decorations ==
Left Side:

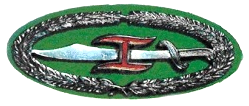

Badges	Combat Commander's Badge		
1st row		Chief Commander, Philippine Legion of Honor	1 Outstanding Achievement Medal
2nd row	Legionnaire, Philippine Legion of Honor	1 Outstanding Achievement Medal	5 Distinguished Service Stars with three bronze anahaw clusters
3rd row	5 Gold Cross Medals with three bronze anahaw clusters	1 Silver Cross Medal	1 Meritorious Achievement Medal
4th row	1 Distinguished Service Medal	1 Chief of Staff of the AFP Commendation Medal	Gawad sa Kaunlaran
5th row	8 Bronze Cross Medals	3 Silver Wing Medal	Military Merit Medals with three spearhead devices, 27 overall total medals
6th row	Military Merit Medals with three silver anahaws, 27 overall total medals	Military Merit Medals with four bronze anahaws, 27 overall total medals	2 Sagisag ng Ulirang Kawal
7th row	5 Military Civic Action Medals	1st Parangal sa Kapanalig ng Sandatahang Lakas ng Pilipinas Medal	2nd Parangal sa Kapanalig ng Sandatahang Lakas ng Pilipinas Medal
8th row	5 Military Commendation Medals with three bronze triangular devices	2 Long Service Medals with two campaign stars	5 Anti-dissidence Campaign Medals
9th row	4 Luzon Anti-Dissidence Campaign Medals with three campaign stars	2 Mindanao Anti-Dissidence Campaign Medals with three campaign stars	Disaster Relief and Rehabilitation Operations Ribbon

Right Side:

1st row	Philippine Republic Presidential Unit Citation	People Power I Unit Citation	People Power II Unit Citation

Badges and Other Awards:

- Scout Ranger Qualification Badge
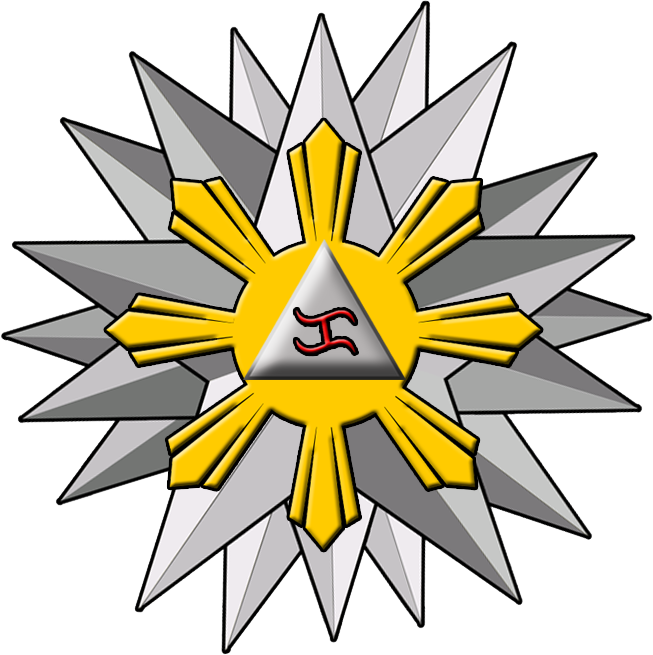
- AFP Command and General Staff Course Badge
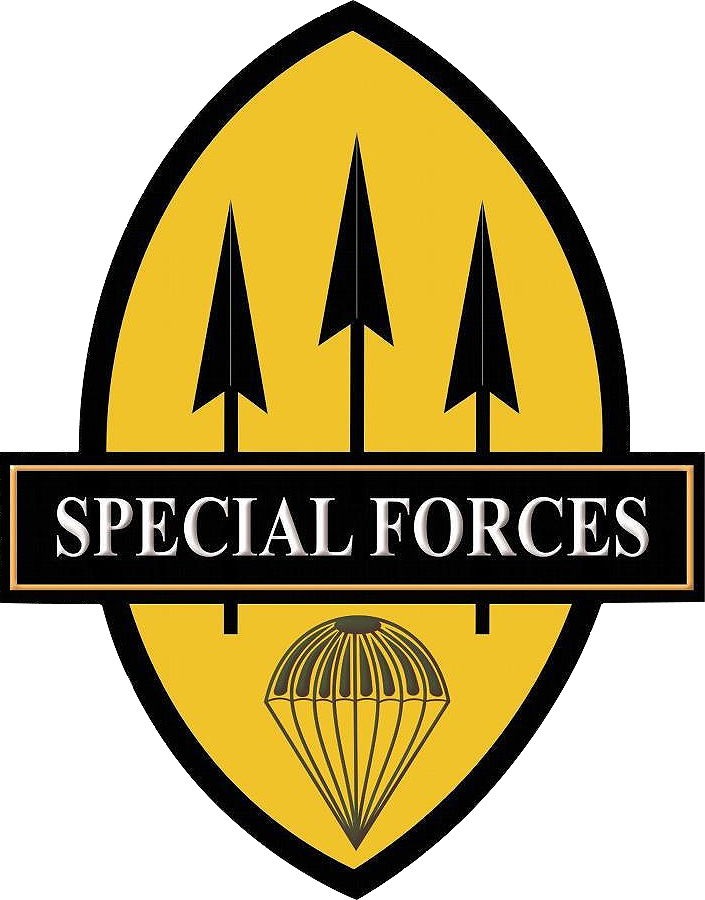
- Special Forces Qualification Badge
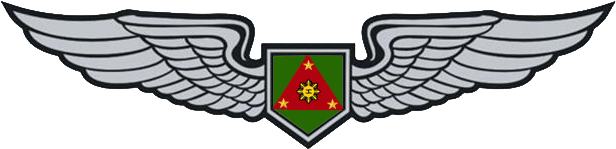
- Army Aviation Badge
- AFP Parachutist Badge

== Personal life ==
He has 3 children from his first marriage to the late Stella V. Gapay.
