= General Santos (disambiguation) =

General Santos is a city in the Philippines, General Santos may also refer to:

- Alejo Santos (1911–1984), Philippine Commonwealth Army brigadier general
- Alfredo Santos (1905–1990), Armed Forces of the Philippines general
- Felimon Santos Jr. (born 1964), Philippine Army general
- Paulino Santos (1890–1945), Philippine Army major general, namesake of the city
