= Eastern Mindanao Command =

Philippine Military's unified branch command for Eastern Mindanao

Coordinates: 7°9′12.38″N 125°39′38.67″E

- AFP Eastern Mindanao Command coat of amrs
- Active: August 28, 2006–present
- Country: Philippines
- Role: Conventional and Unconventional Warfare, Anti-Guerrilla Operations
- Part of: Under the Armed Forces of the Philippines
- Garrison/HQ: Panacan, Davao City
- Nickname: EastMinCom
- Motto: Kagitingan
- Mascot: Mount Apo
- Anniversaries: August 28

Commanders
- Current commander: LtGen. Luis Rex D. Bergante AFP
- Notable commanders: LtGen Felimon T. Santos Jr. AFP; LtGen Benjamin Madrigal AFP

Insignia
- Unit Patch: Eastern Mindanao Command Emblem

The Eastern Mindanao Command (abbrv. as EASTMINCOM) is the Armed Forces of the Philippines' unified command in charge of the Davao, Soccsksargen, and Caraga regions. It is responsible for the defense of these areas against external aggression, as well as combating terrorism and insurgency.

== Organization ==
The following are the units that are under the Eastern Mindanao Command.

- Joint Task Force Haribon (Strike to Protect), EASTMINCOM, AFP (JTFH)
- Military Intelligence Group 11, ISAFP
- Military Intelligence Group 16, ISAFP
- 5th Civil Relations Group, AFP
- 4th Infantry Division, PA
- 10th Infantry Division, PA
- 52nd Engineer Brigade, PA
- Naval Forces Eastern Mindanao, PN
- Tactical Operations Wing Eastern Mindanao, PAF
- Tactical Operations Group 10, PAF
- Tactical Operations Group 11, PAF
- Joint Reserve Task Force - Metro Davao (JRTF-Metro Davao), AFP
- 22nd Infantry Division (Ready Reserve), PA
- 10th Regional Community Defense Group, ARESCOM
- 11th Regional Community Defense Group, ARESCOM
- 12th Regional Community Defense Group, ARESCOM
- 15th Regional Community Defense Group, ARESCOM
- 5th Air Reserve Center, PAF
- 7th Air Reserve Center, PAF
- Naval Reserve Center Eastern Mindanao, PN

== Operations ==
- Peace and Development Outreach in Communities to enlighten the people about NPA Propaganda Units' deception and exploitation
- Protect the Peace Process
- Humanitarian Assistance and Disaster Response Operations

== Lineage of Commander ==
- LtGen. Rodolfo S. Obaniana AFP (28 August 2006 – 31 August 2007)
- LtGen. Cardozo M. Luna AFP (31 August 2007 – 7 May 2008)
- MGen. Armando L. Cunanan AFP (7 May 2008 – 21 January 2009)
- LtGen. Raymundo B. Ferrer AFP (21 January 2009 – 18 November 2010)
- LtGen. Arthur I. Tabaquero AFP (18 November 2010 – 17 April 2012)
- LtGen. Jorge V. Segovia AFP (17 April 2012 – 23 April 2013)
- LtGen. Ricardo Ranier G. Cruz III AFP (23 April 2013 – 5 September 2014)
- LtGen. Aurelio B. Baladad AFP (5 September 2014 – 21 November 2015)
- LtGen. Rey Leonardo B. Guerrero AFP (21 November 2015 – 26 October 2017)
- BGen. Perfecto M. Rimando Jr. AFP (26 October 2017 – 15 November 2017) (acting)
- LtGen. Benjamin R. Madrigal AFP (15 November 2017 – 11 December 2018)
- MGen. Ronald C. Villanueva AFP (11 December 2018 – 21 January 2019) (acting)
- LtGen. Felimon T. Santos Jr. AFP (21 January 2019 – 4 January 2020)
- BGen. Alfredo V. Rosario Jr. (4 January 2020 – 25 January 2020) (acting)
- LtGen. Jose C. Faustino Jr. AFP (25 January 2020 – 8 March 2021)
- LtGen. Greg T. Almerol AFP (8 March 2021 – 31 May 2024)
- BGen. Jose Maria R. Cuerpo II (31 May 2024 - 7 June 2024) (acting)
- LtGen. Luis Rex D. Bergante (7 June 2024 - present)
