= FV101 Scorpion =

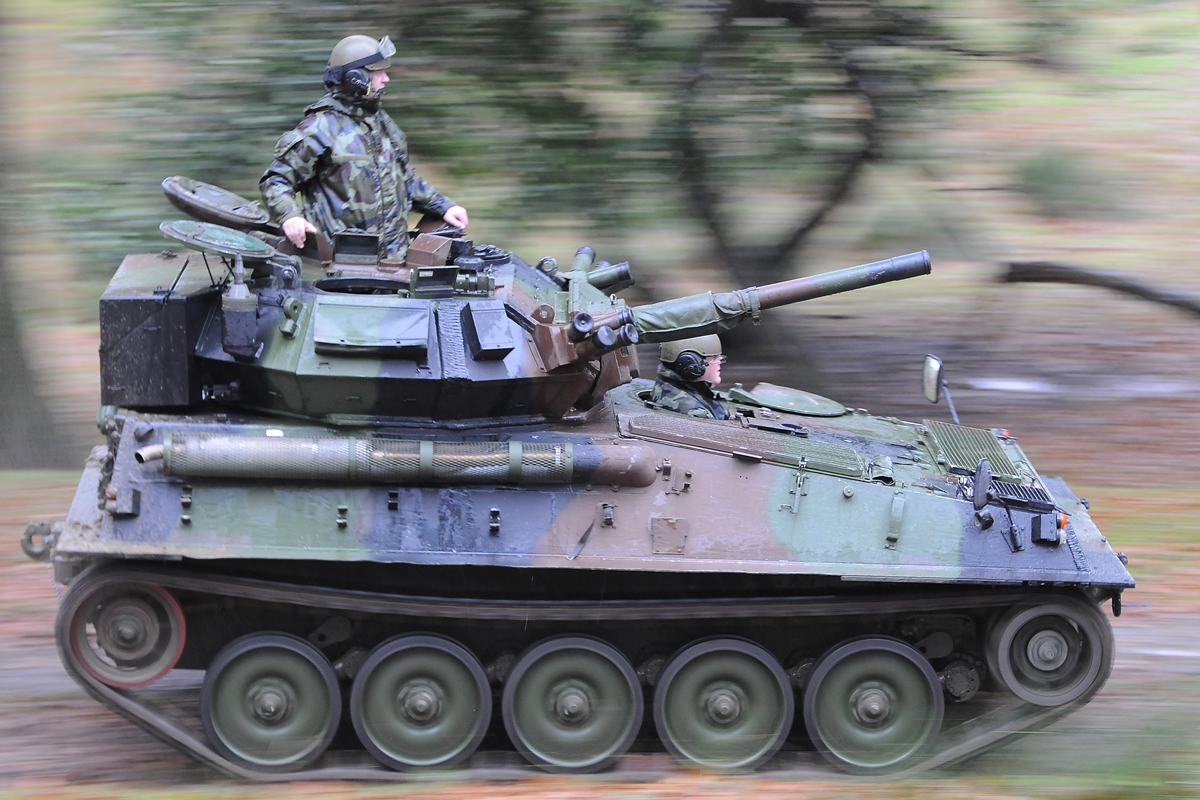
- Irish Army Scorpion CVR(T)
- Type: Reconnaissance vehicle, Light tank
- Place of origin: United Kingdom

Service history
- In service: 1973–present
- Used by: Operators
- Wars: Iran–Iraq War; Falklands War; 1989 Philippine coup d'état attempt Gulf War; Zamboanga City crisis 2025 Cambodia–Thailand clashes

Production history
- Manufacturer: Alvis Vehicles, Coventry, England
- No. built: c. 3,000 (1,500 for UK, c. 1,500 exported)
- Variants: Scorpion 90

Specifications
- Mass: 17,800 lb (8.074 tonnes)
- Length: 4.79 m (15 ft 9 in) (hull), 5.288 m (17 ft 4.2 in) (inc 90 mm gun)
- Width: 2.134 m (7 ft 0 in)
- Height: 2.102 m (6 ft 10.8 in)
- Crew: 3
- Armour: Aluminium armour, Cast and 1318b plate 13 mm (front and sides)
- Main armament: ROF 76mm L23A1 gun 90mm Cockerill Mk3 M-A1 gun (in Scorpion 90)
- Secondary armament: Coaxial 7.62 mm L43A1 machine gun
- Engine: Cummins BTA 5.9-litre (diesel); 190 hp (140 kW)
- Power/weight: 22.92 hp (17.3 kW) / tonne
- Transmission: Self Change Gears TN15X
- Suspension: Torsion-bar
- Operational range: 756 km (470 mi)
- Maximum speed: 72.5 km/h (45.0 mph)

The FV101 Scorpion is a British armoured reconnaissance vehicle and light tank. It was the lead vehicle and the fire support type in the Combat Vehicle Reconnaissance (Tracked), CVR(T), family of seven armoured vehicles. Manufactured by Alvis, it was introduced into service with the British Army in 1973 and was withdrawn in 1994. More than 3,000 were produced and used as reconnaissance vehicles or light tanks.

It held the Guinness world record for the fastest production tank, recorded doing 82.23 km/h (51.10 mph) at the QinetiQ vehicle test track in Chertsey, Surrey, on 26 January 2002.

== History ==
The CVR(T) family of vehicles came from a British Army requirement for an armoured fighting vehicle that could be rapidly airlifted to trouble spots. The Armoured Vehicle Reconnaissance was supposed to carry both a gun and an anti-tank missile, but it was not possible to design an air portable vehicle to the specification. The limits on both size and weight led to the use of aluminium alloy for the hull and an adapted car engine for propulsion. The anti-tank capability was given to a dedicated vehicle, Striker, while what became Scorpion would use a 76 mm gun in the fire support role.

In 1967, Alvis was awarded the contract to produce 30 CVR(T) prototypes. Vehicles P1–P17, the Scorpion prototypes, were delivered on time and within the budget. After extensive hot and cold weather trials in Norway, Australia, Abu Dhabi and Canada, the Scorpion was accepted by the British Army in May 1970, with a contract for 275, which later rose to 313 vehicles. The first production vehicles were completed in 1972 and the first British regiment to be equipped with the Scorpion were the Blues and Royals of the Household Cavalry in 1973.

Alvis built more than 3,000 Scorpion vehicles for the British Army, Royal Air Force Regiment and the export market. All of the CVR(T) vehicles were to be air-portable; and two Scorpions could be carried in a Lockheed C-130 Hercules. Another requirement of the CVR(T) project was the low ground pressure, similar to that of a soldier on foot; this would serve it well in the boggy conditions of the Falklands War.

=== Armament ===
L23A1 gun
- Place of origin: United Kingdom

Service history
- In service: 1973–present

Production history
- Manufacturer: Royal Ordnance

Specifications
- Length: 2.157 m (7 ft 0.9 in)
- Calibre: 76 mm (3.0 in)
- Elevation: +35 degrees/−10 degrees
- Rate of fire: 6 rounds per minute
- Effective firing range: 2,200 m (2,400 yd)

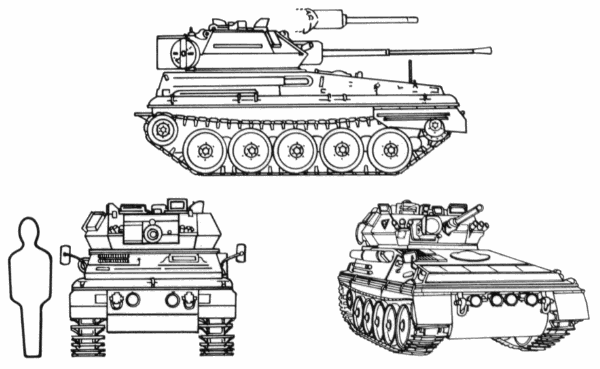
The Scorpion/Scimitar in the US Army field recognition manual.

The Scorpion was armed with the low velocity 76 mm L23A1 gun, which could fire high-explosive, HESH, smoke and canister rounds. Storage was provided for 40 or 42 rounds. A 7.62 mm coaxial L7 GPMG (3,000 rounds carried) was also fitted, as were two multi-barrelled smoke grenade dischargers, one on each side of the turret. The main armament has an elevation of 35 degrees and a depression of 10 degrees; the turret has a full 360-degree traverse. The traverse was however hand-cranked, a cost-saving feature that made traversing the turret relatively slow and laborious relative to other vehicles of its type. This gun was later deemed to be unsatisfactory, as RAF testing showed that the lack of a fume extraction system caused toxic fumes to enter the fighting compartment, endangering the crew's health.

Some Scorpions used the Cockerill Mk3 90mm gun instead. This weapon could fire the following rounds:

- APFSDS: muzzle velocity 1210 m/s; projectile mass 2.5 kg; penetration 100 mm RHA @ 60 degree obliquity
- HE-T: muzzle velocity 714 m/s; projectile mass 5.1 kg with 1.1 kg of filling;
- HEAT-T: muzzle velocity 890 m/s; projectile mass 4.1 kg; penetration 250 mm of RHA @ 0 degree obliquity
- HESH-T: muzzle velocity 800 m/s; projectile mass 4.5 kg with 1.2 kg of filling

=== Engine ===
The original engine was the Jaguar J60 Mk 100b 4.2-litre petrol engine, which was replaced by a Cummins or Perkins diesel engine. The maximum speed was about 50 mph (80 km/h) and it could accelerate from standing to 30 mph (48 km/h) in 16 seconds. The maximum speed on water (with the flotation screen deployed) was 3.6 mph (5.8 km/h). The Irish engineering company IED replaced the Jaguar engine in Irish Army Scorpions with a Steyr M16 TCA HD engine (6-cylinder, 145 kW), making Irish Scorpions more powerful and more reliable in critical environments.

=== Armour ===
The FV101 was a very light armoured vehicle, weighing in at a mere 8 tonnes. This meant some compromises had to be made on protection. The vehicle had 12.7 mm of sloped aluminium armour on both the front and sides, giving an average effective thickness of 25 mm.

The FV101 had all-around protection from shell fragments and 7.62 mm rounds, and the heavily sloped frontal arc was designed to be resistant to 14.5 mm rounds fired from 200 m (660 ft). The initial manufacture of the aluminium armour resulted, after time and effects of the environment, in failure; stress corrosion cracking (SCC) which seriously affected all early builds.

=== Other systems ===
The vehicle was fitted with a nuclear, biological, chemical protection system, image intensification sights for gunner and driver and a floatation screen. A commode was located under the commander's seat. An internal water tank and a boiling vessel for cooking and heating water were also provided.

== Service history ==
The Scorpion has been used by the armed forces of Belgium, Botswana, Brunei, Chile, Honduras, Iran, Indonesia, Ireland, Jordan, Malaysia, New Zealand, Nigeria, Oman, Philippines, Spain, Tanzania, Thailand, Togo, the United Arab Emirates, and Venezuela. The Iranian army acquired 250 Scorpions in the late 1970s and a number of them are still in use after being refurbished locally as the Tosan tank. Scorpions were on occasion deployed to main UK airports as a show of force against possible terrorist threats, e.g., Operation Marmion at Heathrow Airport in 1974. Similar operations in 2003 used the then-current Scimitar.

=== Combat use ===
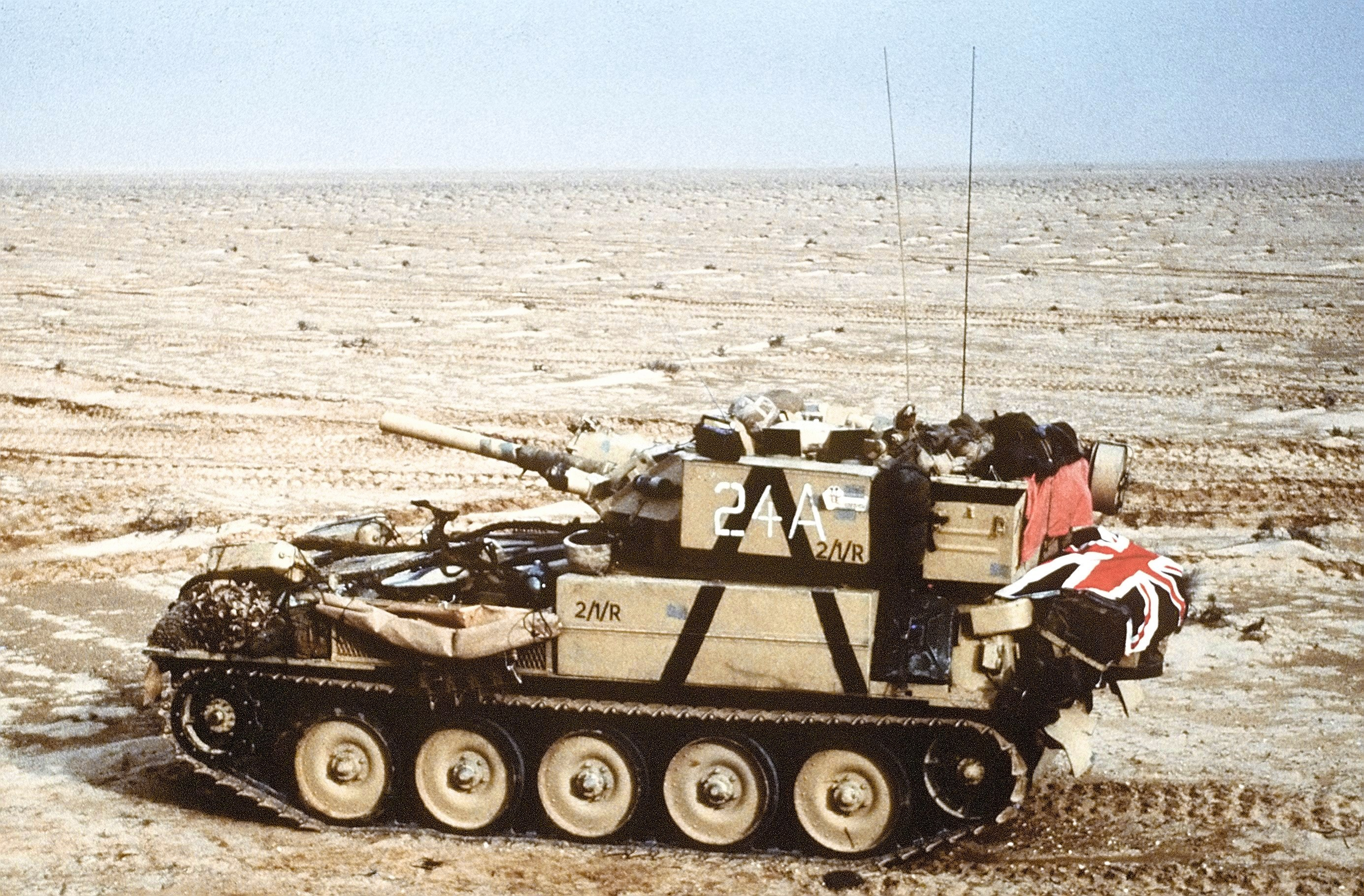
Scorpion advancing across the desert during the first Gulf War.

B Squadron, Blues and Royals were airlifted and deployed into the Akrotiri and Dhekelia Sovereign Base areas, during the Turkish invasion of Cyprus 1974.

Two troops from B Squadron, Blues and Royals served in the Falklands War. One troop was equipped with four Scorpions, the other with four FV107 Scimitars. These were the only armoured vehicles used in action by the British Army during the conflict. Two Scorpions and two Scimitar supported a diversionary attack by Scots Guards on Argentine Marines' entrenchments in the southern slopes of Mount Tumbledown in the early hours of 13 June 1982. One Scorpion manoeuvred off the track and was disabled by an anti-tank mine.

Scorpions also served in the Gulf War. The 16th/5th The Queen's Royal Lancers deployed in the first Gulf War (Operation Granby) using all variants of the CVR(T) range carrying out the role of force reconnaissance for the British spearhead towards Iraq, operating forward of other official green army units. The 1st The Queen's Dragoon Guards, a reconnaissance regiment, had 32 and the close reconnaissance troops of the armoured regiments each had eight. They were also used by No. 1 Squadron RAF Regiment, which was attached to the British 1st Armoured Division.

=== Foreign users ===
The Botswana Defence Force, the Iranian Army and the Nigerian Army continue to use Scorpions, in some cases up-armed with the 90 mm Cockerill.

The Iranian army used its Scorpion tanks in the Iran–Iraq War, with various degrees of success. Early in the war, Iran used the Scorpions's "accurate fire" (alongside the Cobra attack helicopters) to hold back the Iraqi 2nd Infantry Division's offensive towards the city of Ilam. However, the Scorpions proved less effective when faced with Iraq's 9th Armoured Division:

A second [Iraqi] column rushed to Susangerd, which it crossed without encountering any resistance, the city having apparently been left defenseless. The column continued in the direction of Hamidiyeh. It came into contact with the [Iranian] 92nd Armored Division's reconnaissance regiment, which met it with effective in-depth defense. Yet the Iranians eventually had to yield in the face of Iraqi pressure. Their Scorpions' 90 mm guns did not hold their weight against the T-62 tanks' 115 mm guns. The Iraqis thus took control of Hamidiyeh, then Bozorg.

The British government provided Iran (and Iraq) with limited parts for their Scorpions during the war:

Regarding military matters, the British government imposed two strict rules: contracts signed before the war would be honored, but the sale of equipment likely to significantly increase either side's military capacities was banned. Interpreting these regulations loosely, the British government delivered both the Iranians and the Iraqis motors and spare parts for Chieftain and Scorpion tanks, which would allow the former to maintain tanks acquired under the Shah and the latter to repair tanks captured from the Iranian army.

The Royal Thai Army used Scorpions in clashes along the Thai-Cambodian border in December 2025

== Variants ==
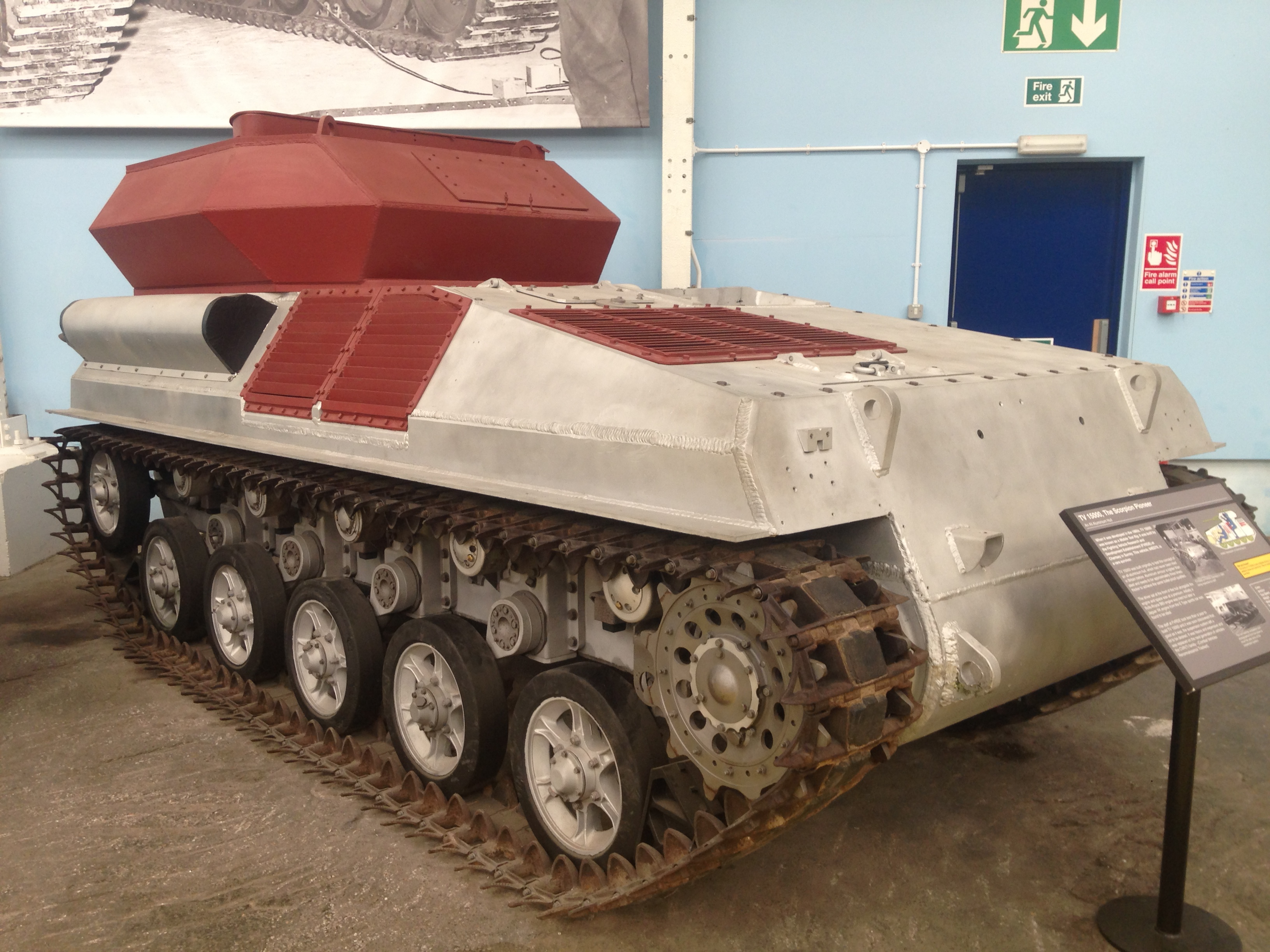
TV15000 at Bovington Tank Museum in 2017

- TV15000: Prototype of the Scorpion with dummy turret.
- Scorpion 90: The Scorpion 90 or Scorpion 2 was a version armed with the long-barrelled Cockerill Mk3 M-A1 90mm gun designed for the export market.
- Sabre: The Scorpion has been withdrawn from British Army service and the refurbished hulls have been mated with surplus turrets from the FV 721 Fox CVR(W) wheeled reconnaissance vehicle to form a composite vehicle—the Sabre reconnaissance vehicle.
- Salamander: A small number of converted Scorpions are in use at British Army Training Unit Suffield in Canada as part of OPFOR. With the main armament barrel replaced with a dummy they represent 125mm gun armed T-80-type vehicles.

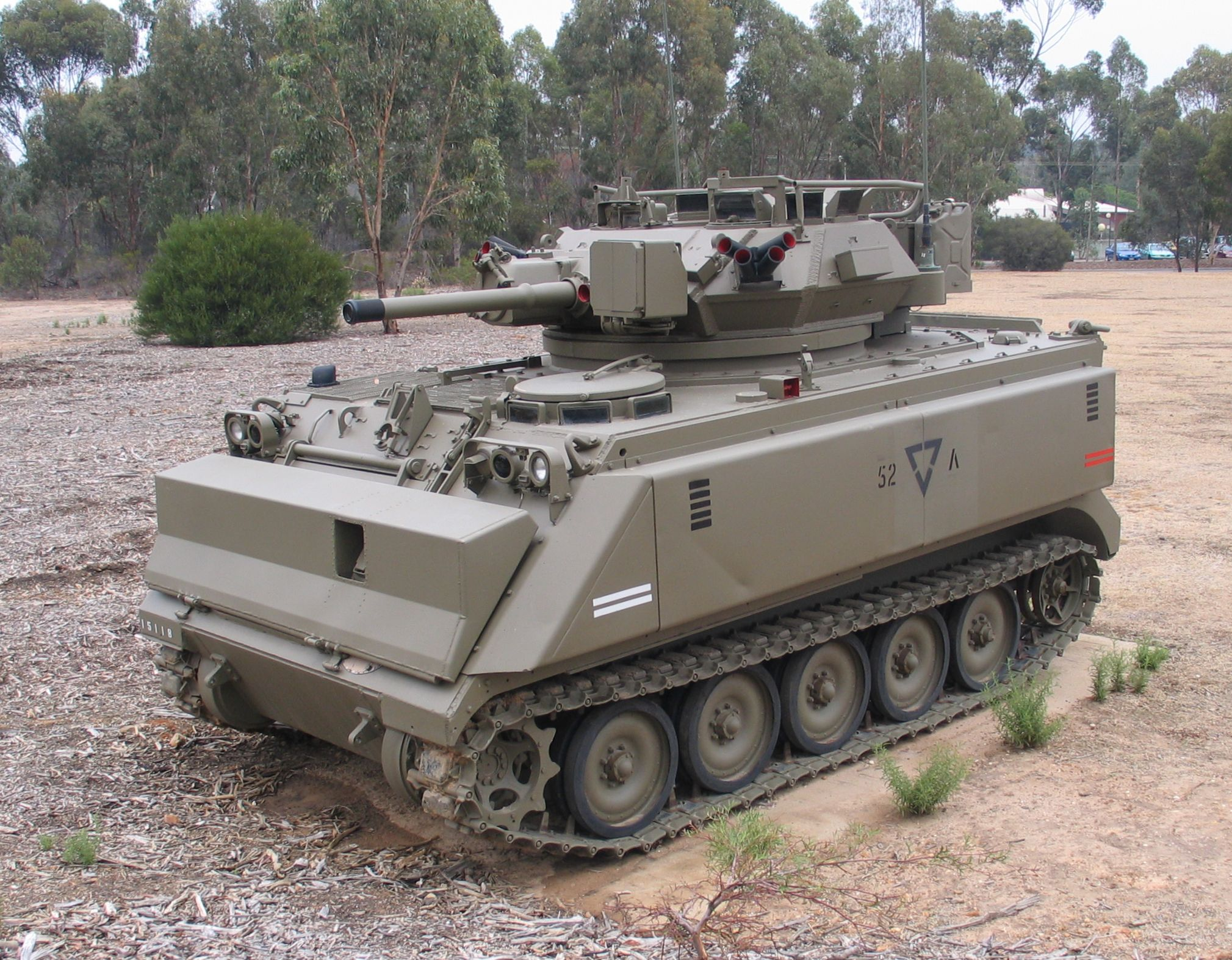
M113 MRV in Puckapunyal Camp

Turret only

- M113A1 MRV

During the late 1960s, as a result of its experiences in the Vietnam War, the Australian Army perceived a need for a hybrid, tracked fire support and reconnaissance vehicle.

Experiments in which existing M113 APCs were fitted with Saladin (not Scorpion) turrets, wielding a 76 mm M1 gun, were successful. The vehicle entered service as the M113A1 FSV (Fire Support Vehicle).

A very similar, subsequent vehicle, attaching the turret from the Scorpion to the M113, was also known as the FSV. (This re-purposing of the turret was to be the only use of any part of the Scorpion by the ADF.) Entering service in 1976, it was later redesignated the M113A1 Medium Reconnaissance Vehicle (MRV). Its development also obviated interest in acquiring brand new, purpose-built vehicles (such as a variant of the UK CVR(T) or the M2/M3 Bradley). All of these vehicles were retired in 1996.

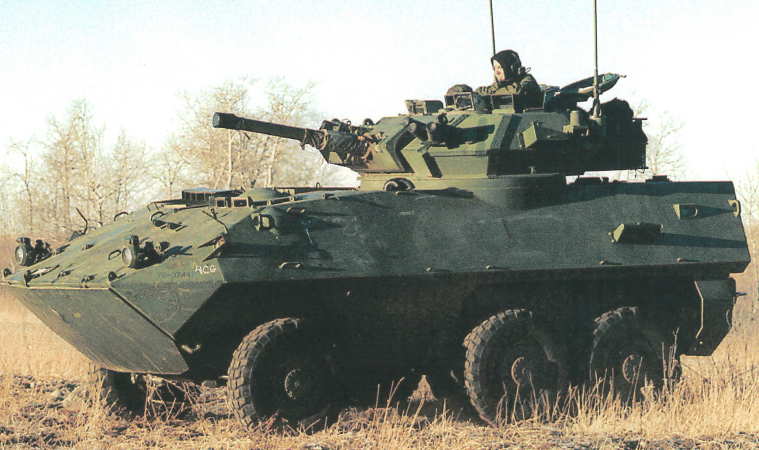
SALH Cougar at CFB Wainwright

- AVGP Cougar

In the 1970s the Canadian Armed Forces acquired a family of 6x6 armoured vehicles, based on the Swiss Mowag Piranha I, which were known as the AVGP (Armoured Vehicle General Purpose). The Cougar was the reconnaissance and fire-support variant, and was fitted with the standard Scorpion turret, armed with a 76mm gun.

The Cougar was used for training in Canada, as a reconnaissance vehicle, and as fire support for those units not equipped with the Leopard MBT. The AVGP family was retired from service starting in 2005. A total of 44 Cougars were subsequently bought and refurbished by Uruguay for use in African peacekeeping missions, however these had their turrets removed to convert them into APCs.

== Operators ==
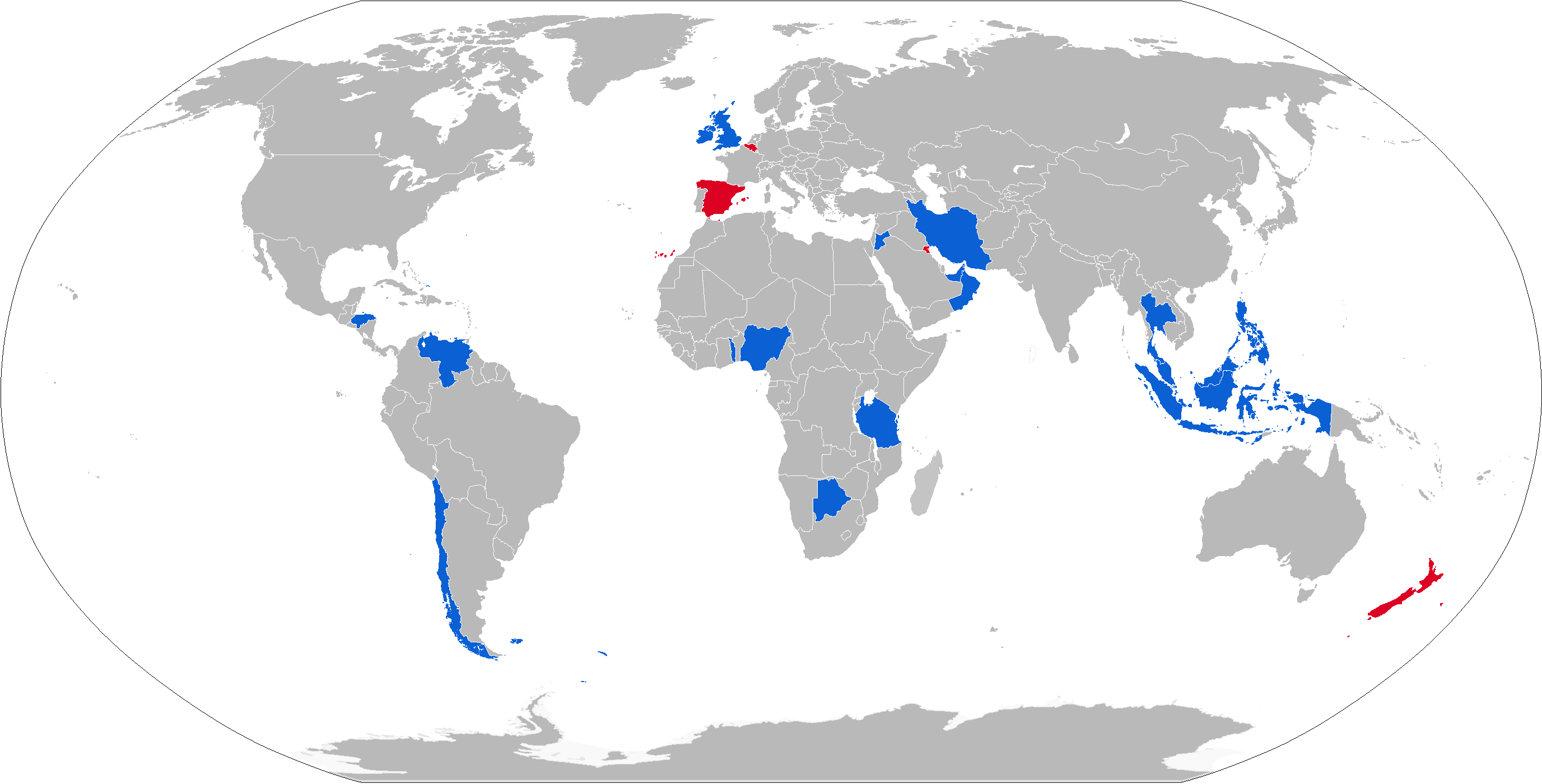
Operators Current Former

=== Current operators ===
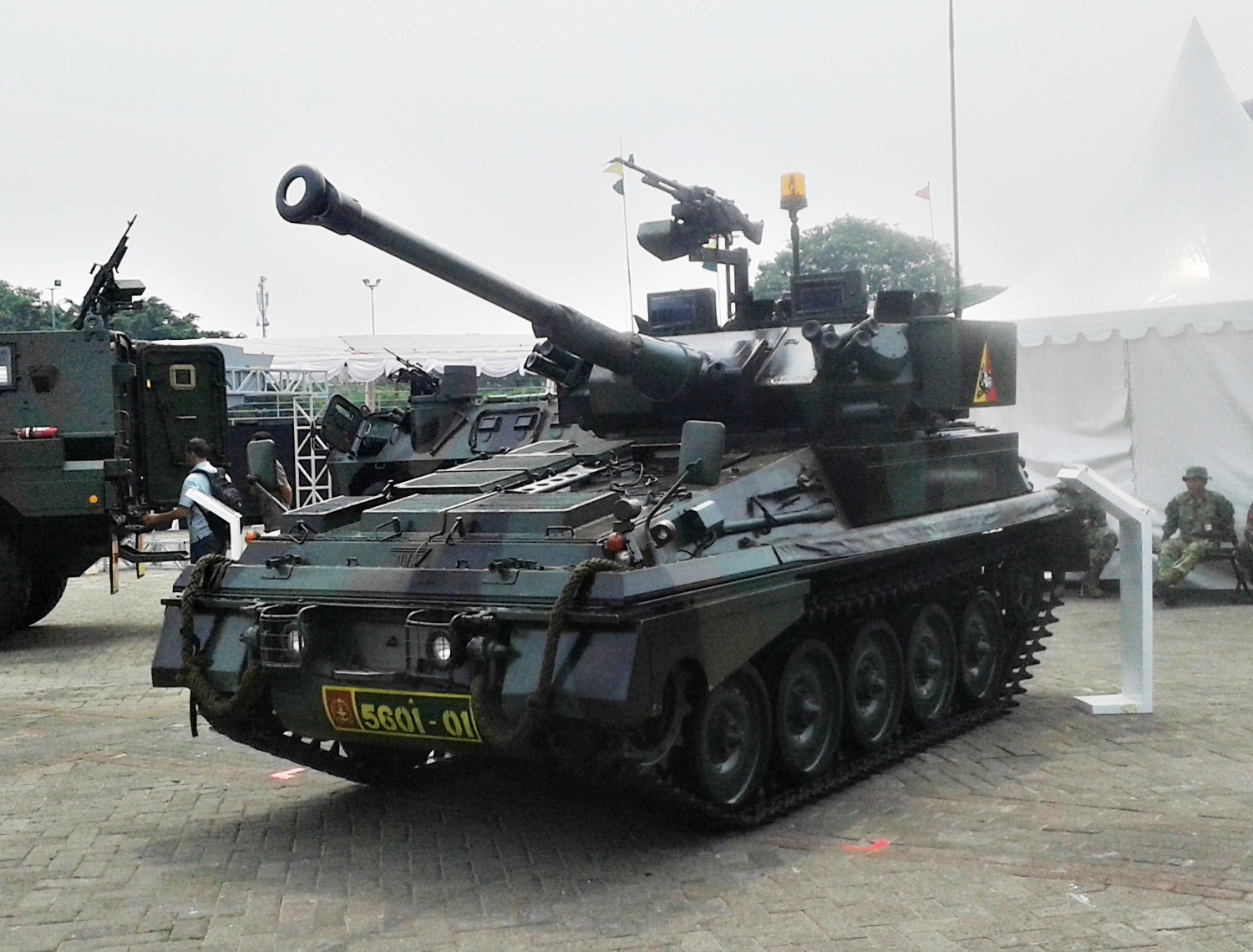
Indonesian Scorpion 90 on IIMS 2014

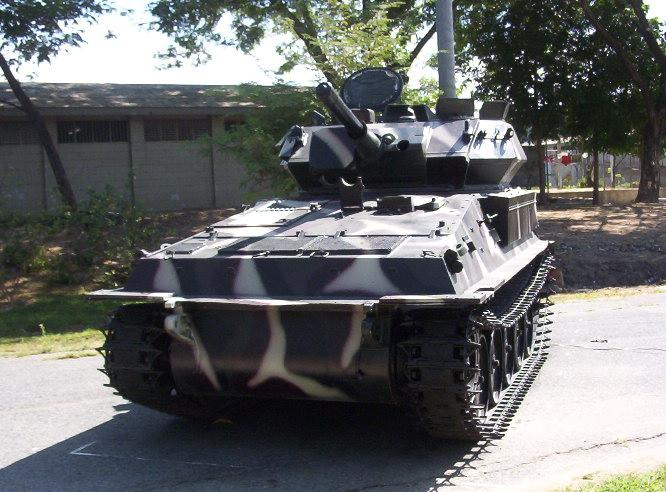
Philippine Army FV101 Scorpion

- Botswana: 25 units. Purchased second-hand from Belgium and retrofitted with diesel engines as requested by Botswana.
- Brunei: 20 units
- Chile: 27 units; currently 15 in service in the Chilean Marine Corps. Ex-British vehicles which have been re-engined with diesel motors.
- Honduras: 19 units
- Iran: Iran contracted Alvis for the supply of 250 vehicles in 1978, expanded with an additional order for 110 Scorpions shortly thereafter. Participated in the Iran–Iraq War. By 1997, the Iranian army had approximately 80 vehicles in working order.
- Indonesia: 90 units
- Jordan: 26 units. Likely sourced from Iraq.
- Nigeria: 150 units. In 1983, 33 vehicles were selected to be upgraded with an improved 90 mm Cockerill Mk III gun replacing the original 76 mm cannon. These vehicles were also equipped with a Belgian-sourced OIP-5 fire control system.
- Oman: 120 Units. Scorpion light tanks replaced the Saladin armoured car. Deliveries were carried out in several stages and included Sultan, Spartan and Samson vehicles as well as a command vehicle built on the Stormer chassis, and which were to be used in units alongside Oman's Chieftain main battle tank. The Omani vehicles are equipped with external mounting points for fuel cans and special mud flaps designed to suppress the amount of dust kicked up during travel. The NBC filtration system and heaters were removed and replaced with an air conditioning system and the vehicles received a warning siren indicating engine overheating. The hull floor was also reinforced with a 20 mm plate for increased mine resistance.
- Philippines: Philippine Army: Original delivery of 41 units delivered, 7 units currently active and assigned to Armor "Pambato" Division, to be replaced by the Sabrah light tank.
  - Philippine Presidential Security Group – 4 units
- Thailand: 100 units
- Tanzania: 40 units
- Togo: 12 units. Includes one FV106 Samson, one FV104 Samaritan and one FV105 Sultan.
- United Arab Emirates: 76 units, several of which were upgraded with the Pilkington Optronics TLS (Tank Laser Sight) from the Chieftain tank.
- Venezuela: 78 Scorpion 90s, four to six FV104 Samaritans, two FV105 Sultans and four FV106 Samsons. The vehicles were ordered in 1988 with a contract value of US$85 million, with a stipulation for diesel engines; delivery was realised in 1992.

=== Former operators ===
- Belgium: 701 units (this total consists of all seven variants of the CVR(T)). Ordered in 1971 based on studies that showed the light tank was most suitable for the nation's topography; Belgium was the second nation to adopt the Scorpion following the British Army. First deliveries commenced in February 1973 with the vehicles assembled in Mechelen from knock-down kits supplied from the United Kingdom. The order was filled in 1980. Between 1981 and 1983, both Scorpion and Scimitar models were upgraded with mounting points for add-on armour modules, an on-board armour repair kit and other minor improvements to enhance crew comfort and ergonomics. Thirty-six Scorpions were later sold to Botswana in 1994.
- Iraq: Limited number captured from Iran during Iran–Iraq War
- Ireland: 14 units.
- Kuwait
- Malaysia: Purchased 26 units of the Scorpion 90 in 1981 equipped with smoke grenade launchers from Wegmann, in addition to 25 Stormers (12 of which were supplied with a Helio FVT900 turret armed with a 20 mm cannon and 7.62 mm coaxial machine gun and 13 vehicles received a Thyssen-Henschel TH-1 turret armed with twin 7.62 mm machine guns).
- New Zealand: 26 units. Ordered between 1982 and 1983; the vehicles lack NBC protection, night vision sights and do not have provisions for erecting flotation screens. The engines were upgraded with electronic fuel injection and US-made radios. In the second half of the 1980s, New Zealand opted to use the turrets to upgrade their M113 armoured personnel carriers. Served with Queen Alexandra's Mounted Rifles among other units.
- Spain: 17 units in service until 2009 with the Spanish Navy, (Infantería de Marina Española). Sold to Chile. There are a couple of units on static display as of 2011.
- United Kingdom: 1,500 units ordered. Withdrawn from active service in 1994. Served with Nos 1, 2, 15, 34, 51, 58 Squadrons Royal Air Force Regiment and British Army Royal Armoured Corps armoured reconnaissance units such as 15th/19th The King's Royal Hussars.
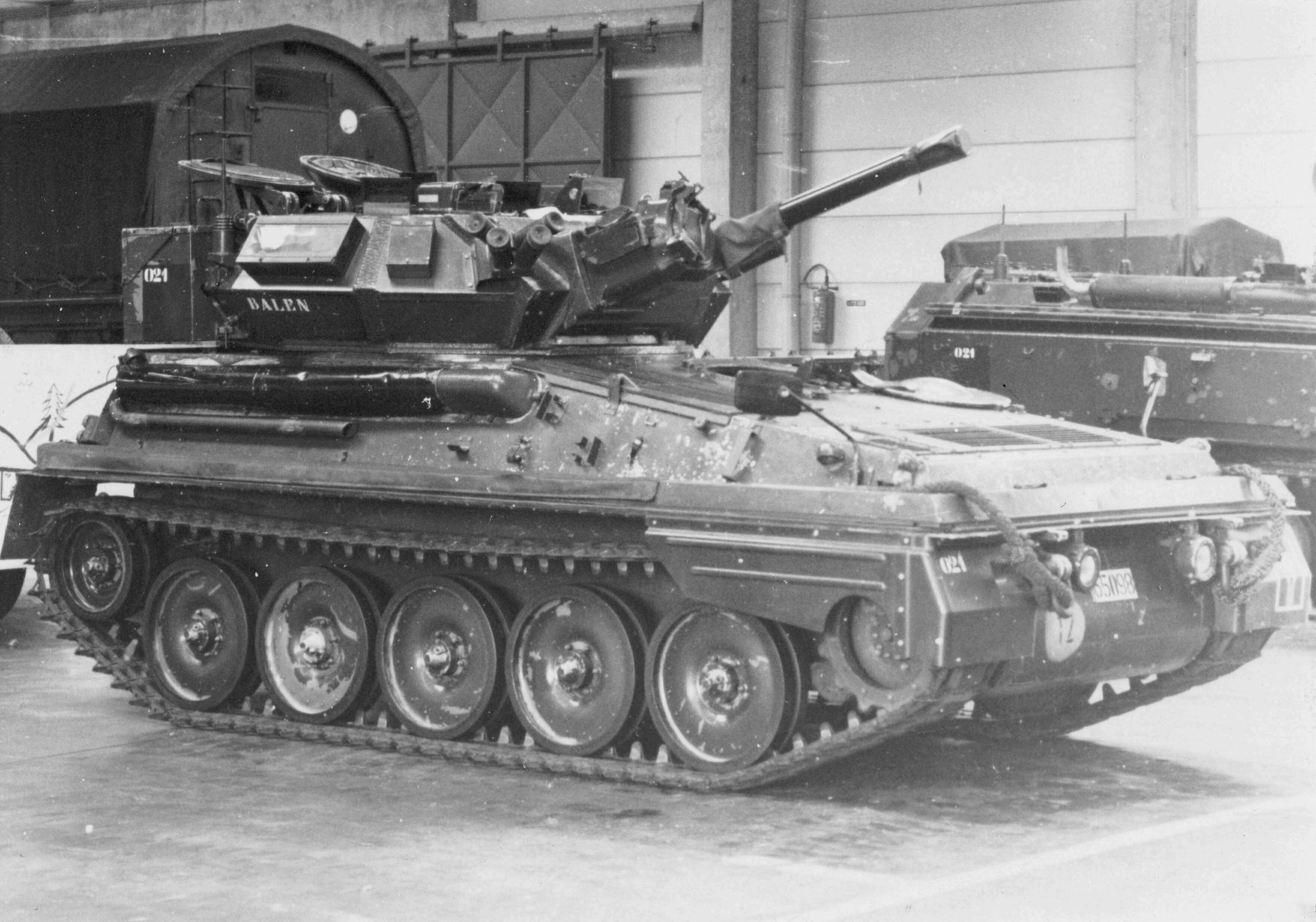
Belgian Scorpion

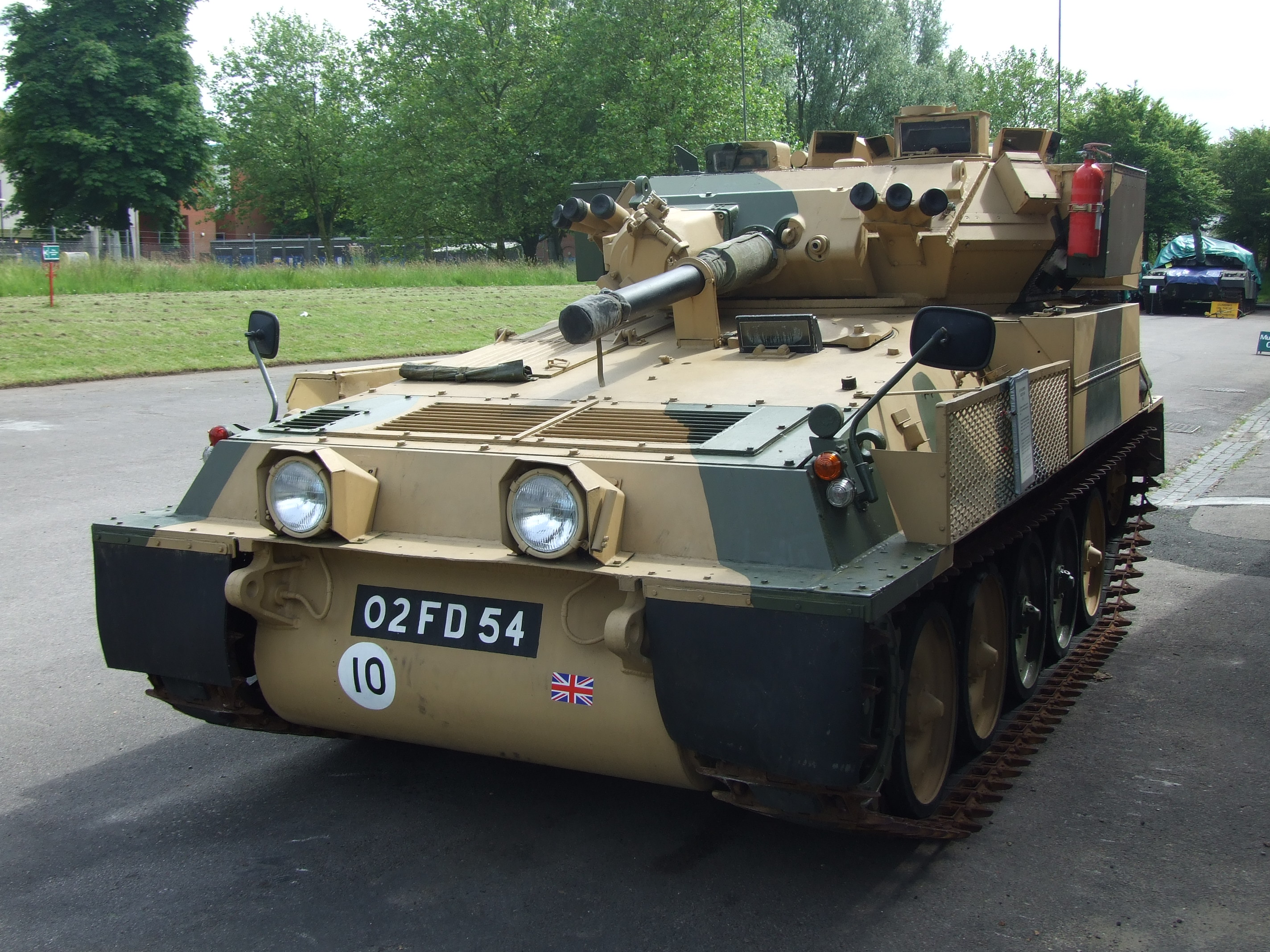
Scorpion at Aldershot military museum

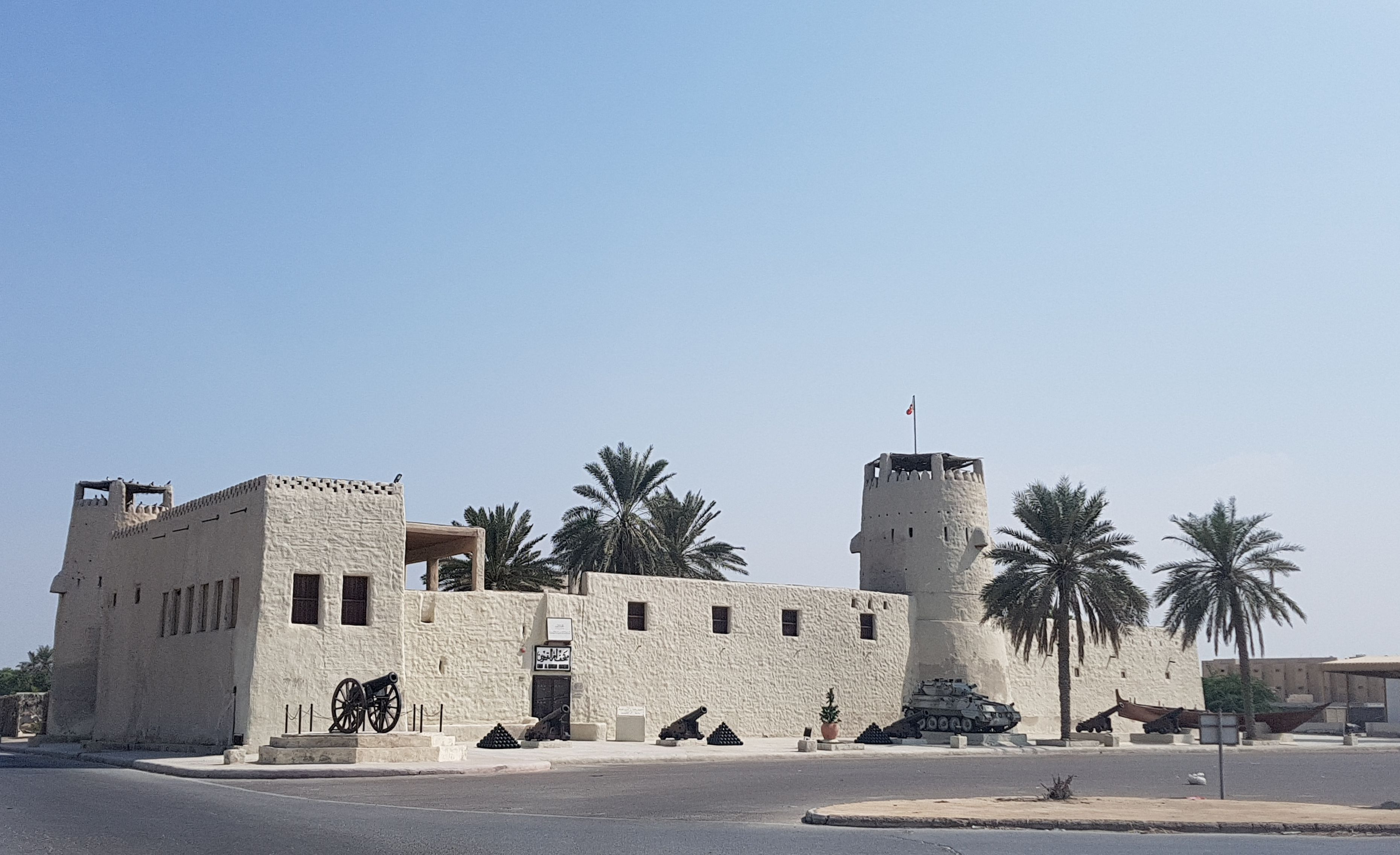
Emirati Scorpion on display at Umm Al Quwain National Museum

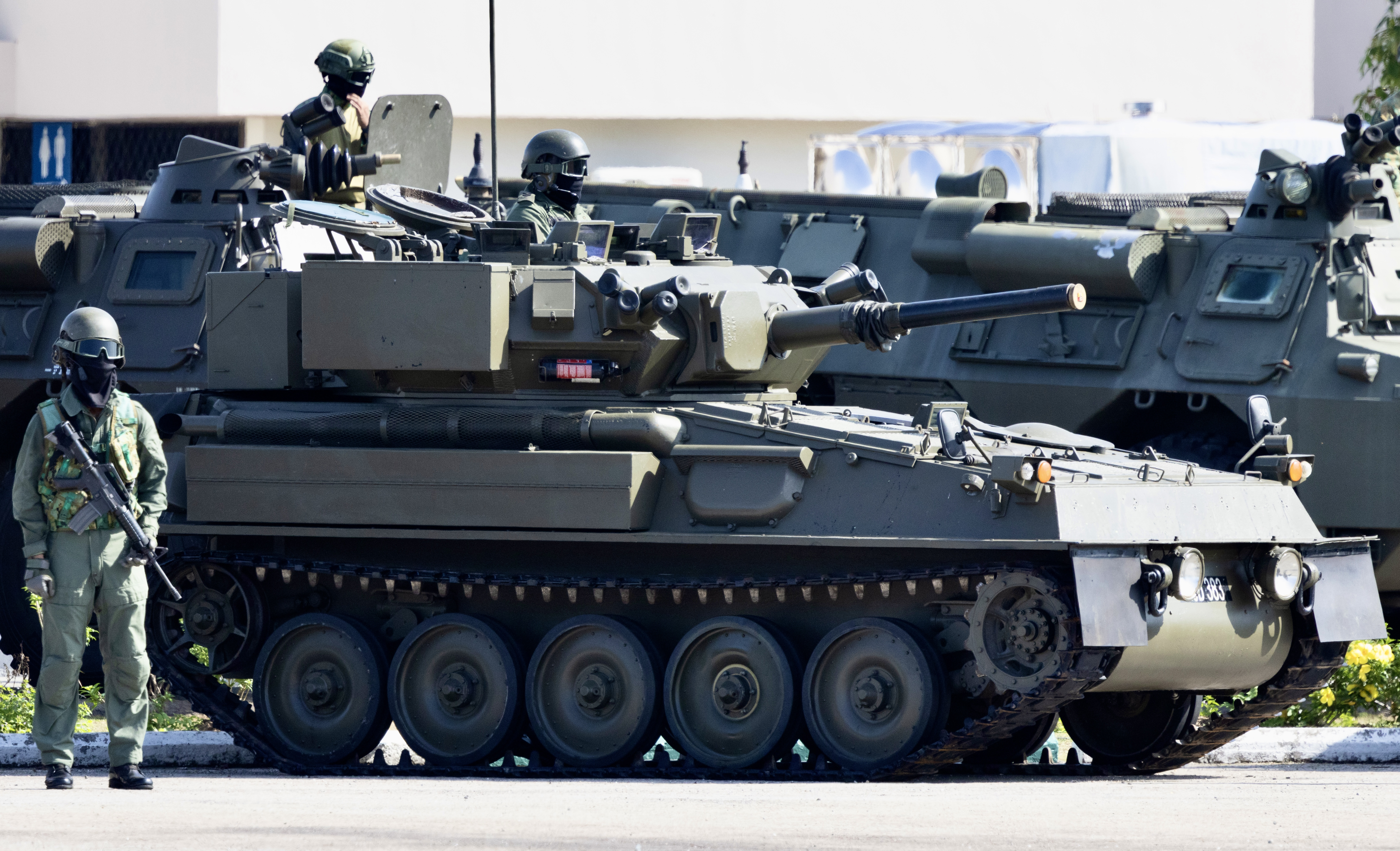
Bruneian FV101 Scorpion

== See also ==
- Combat Vehicle Reconnaissance (Tracked)
  - FV102 Striker anti-tank guided weapon carrier
  - FV103 Spartan armoured personnel carrier
  - FV104 Samaritan armoured ambulance
  - FV105 Sultan command post vehicle
  - FV106 Samson armoured recovery vehicle
  - FV107 Scimitar reconnaissance vehicle
- Alvis Stormer – a larger development of the CVR(T) used in the case of the British Army to carry the Starstreak High Velocity Missile system and Shielder minelaying system
- Tosan, Iranian-built development of Scorpions supplied to Iran in the 1970s, carrying a 90mm gun and Toophan ATGM
