= Armor "Pambato" Division =

Armor Division
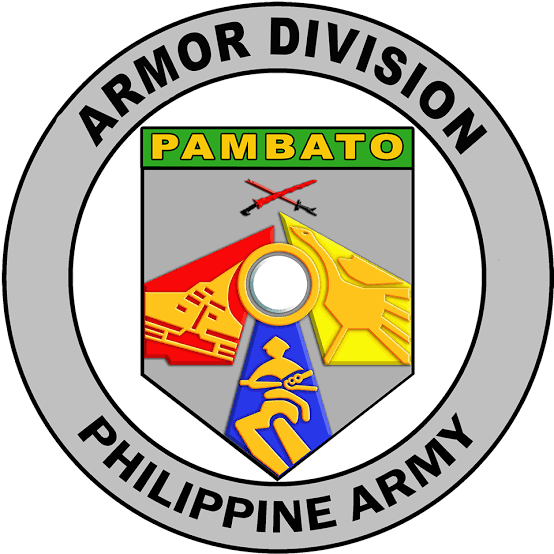
- Active: June 16, 1976 – present
- Country: Philippines
- Branch: Philippine Army
- Type: Cavalry
- Role: Conventional Warfare, Anti-Guerrilla Operations
- Size: 2 brigades
- Part of: Philippine Army (Since 1976)
- Garrison/HQ: Camp O'Donnell, Brgy. Sta. Lucia, Capas, Tarlac, Philippines
- Nickname: Pambato Division
- Anniversaries: June 16
- Engagements: Communist and Islamic Insurgency in the Philippines; Operation Enduring Freedom - Philippines; Anti-guerilla operations against the NPA and the Moro Islamic Liberation Front
- Website: https://armorpambato.com/about

Commanders
- Current commander: MGen. Ronel R Manalo PA
- Notable commanders: LTGen Gilbert I. Gapay AFP

The Armor "Pambato" Division was formerly known as the Mechanized Infantry Division before it was renamed in anticipation of its upcoming assets and ongoing reorganization of units of the Philippine Army as part of the modernization program. It is stationed at Camp O'Donnell, Brgy. Sta. Lucia, Capas, Tarlac and is one of the service's major units. The Armor Division is a combined arms organization composed of tank, cavalry and mechanized infantry.

== History ==
The Armor "Pambato" Division traces its origins to the cavalry units raised by the Spanish Army during the long years of colonial rule and the revolution. These units are the following:

- Colonial Horse Guards Squadron (raised 1755, first cavalry unit to be raised in the islands)
- Colonial Dragoons Regiment (raised 1772 as a Squadron, later raised into a Regiment, the first in the islands, stood down 1860)
- Aguilar Hussars Cavalry Militia Regiment (Colonial Militia) (raised 1804)
- 1st (Philippine) Chasseur Squadron (raised 1860, later became the 31st Cavalry Regiment "Philippine Cavalry")
- 2nd (Spanish) Lancer Squadron (raised 1860)
- Cavalry units raised during the Philippine Revolution by the Katipunan during 1896–1898, and in 1898, cavalry units were organised led by Captain Lorenzo Zialcita. Other separate groups include the Esquadrones de-Voluntarios from Northern Mindanao.
- Presidential Cavalry Squadron raised in late 1898 for the defense of the President and his First Family.

The Philippine Revolutionary Army, starting in 1898, officially included the cavalry as one of its arms.

During the American occupation, a full cavalry regiment, the 26th Cavalry Regiment, Philippine Scouts, was formed in 1922 to provide a cavalry regiment to the regular forces of the Philippine Scouts. This regiment was based in Fort Stostenburg, Angeles City. With the formation of the AFP in 1935 came the formation of the 1st Cavalry Regiment under the 1st Infantry Division, Philippine Army. But, just as during the revolutionary period, the 1st Cavalry Regiment was assigned to Malacanang Palace with the duties of the protection of the President, the First Family, and the palace complex, modeled more after the Household Cavalry and the Indian President's Bodyguard. At the same time, the concept of armored forces was being introduced to the AFP. An old Renault FT tank used during the First World War became the first armored vehicle to be used in the Philippines, albeit only for training purposes. This is the very tank featured in the modern cavalry insignia used by the PA.

During the Second World War's opening days, the 26th Cavalry staged the final cavalry charge in US Army history on January 16, 1942, while fighting the Japanese in Morong, Bataan. (The 1st Cavalry Regiment later stood down in March of the same year.) During the stages of the defense of Bataan, for the first time, tanks and armored vehicles were used in battle in the Philippines, replacing the horses. Units using them including the 194th and 192nd Tank Battalions and the 17th Ordnance Company (Armored), United States Army, which later became the Provisional Tank Group, USSAFE (using M3 Stuarts, Universal Carriers and M3 Gun Motor Carriages) and the 2nd Provisional Tank Battalion of the 2nd Regular Division, PA, USSAFE (also using the Bren gun carriers).

After the war, M4 Shermans, among other vehicles, formed the basis of the armored and mechanized forces of the PA. The 1st and 2nd Light Tank Companies were raised in 1946 to provide the starting blocks for armored warfare in the country. The Philippine Army also created and organised of Battalion Combat Teams (BCT), that saw action during the Korean War, as part of the Philippine Expeditionary Forces to Korea, such as the 10th BCT Tank Company, where they participated the Battle of Yultong, led by Conrado Yap. After the war in Korea, on March 1, 1954, the 1st Cavalry Squadron was organised.

Later, a tank training company was formed in Pampanga to train PA servicemen in armored warfare techniques. Such as the Division Reconnaissance Company, which was soon upgraded as the 1st Tank Battalion in 1960. On April 1, 1974, the 1st Light Armor Battalion was organised under the 1st Infantry Division, which led t to the creation of more related units in other brigades and battalions in the Philippine Army. These units were then part of major infantry divisions until the creation of the Philippine Army Light Armor Regiment (PALAR) on August 16, 1976, integrating all armored units within one single unit.

=== Origin of moniker "Pambato" ===
The Philippine Army Light Armor Regiment (PALAR) was upgraded to the Light Armor Brigade on March 19, 1986, and had major organisational changes until in 2006, it was again upgraded to Light Armor Division, renamed as Mechanized Infantry Division in 2011 and finally redesignated as the Armor (Pambato) Division in 2019.

The moniker "Pambato" was first used in 1976 during its PALAR days. It was said then that Pambato means "piling yunit ng hukbong katihan na panlaban sa larangan ng pakikidigma" (English: Chosen unit of the Army in the field of war). This is pronounced "pambato" with stress at the second syllable "ba" synonymous with "panlaban" which is translated in English as "bet" or the single best unit/person/item amongst a group in the same category, in the hope of winning the field or game they are playing.

June 16 is marked as its Division Raising Day to honor its predecessors.

== Units ==
The following are the combat units that are under the Armor Division.

=== Brigades ===
- 1st Mechanized Infantry (Maasahan) Brigade
- 2nd Mechanized Infantry (Magbalantay) Brigade

=== Battalions ===
- 1st Tank (Masikan) Battalion (Reactivated)
- 1st Mechanized Infantry (Lakan) Battalion
- 2nd Mechanized Infantry (Makasag) Battalion
- 3rd Mechanized Infantry (Makatarungan) Battalion
- 4th Mechanized Infantry (Kalasag) Battalion
- 5th Mechanized Infantry (Kaagapay) Battalion
- 6th Mechanized Infantry (Salaknib) Battalion

=== Cavalry Battalions ===
- 1st Cavalry (Tagapanguna) Battalion
- 2nd Cavalry (Kaagapay) Battalion

=== Companies ===
- 1st Cavalry (Rapido) Company (S)
- 2nd Cavalry (Tagapaglingkod) Company (S)
- 3rd Cavalry (Katapangan) Company (S)
- 4th Cavalry (Karangalan) Company (S)
- 5th Cavalry (Kasangga) Company (S)
- 6th Cavalry (Paghiluigyon) Company (S)
- 7th Cavalry (Masasarigan) Company (S)

=== Aviation units ===
- Army Aviation "Hiraya" Battalion

== Support ==
- Headquarters & Headquarters Service Company
- Army Aviation (Bagwis) Battalion
- Signal (Kalatas) Platoon
- Engineer Combat (Sambisig)Company
- Armor Maintenance (Masinop)Battalion
- The Armor School (Kahusayan)

== Assets ==
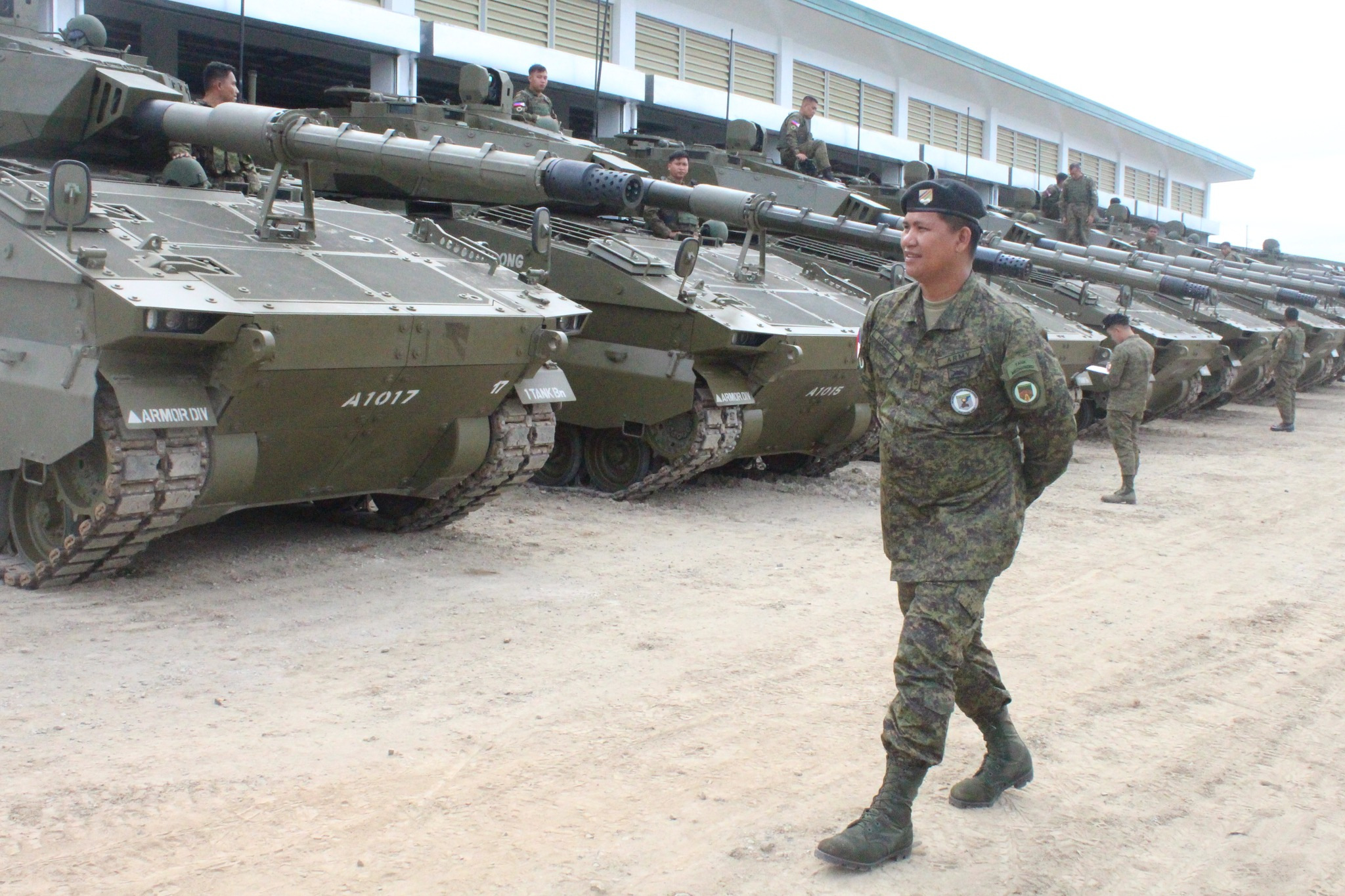
Sabrah Inspection at 1st Tank Battalion, Camp O’Donnell, Brgy Sta Lucia, Capas, Tarlac on 21 February 2025.

The Armor Division integrates infantry operations with mechanized formations. Its current equipment are:

- 9 Sabrah ASCOD 2 Light Tank (+18)
- 1 FV101 Scorpion
- 18 M113 Fire Support Vehicle
- 130 V-150 Commando APC
- 51 Armored Infantry Fighting Vehicle
- 6 ACV-15
- 266 M113 Armored Personnel Carrier
- 150 Simba Amored Personnel Carrier
- 1 ASCOD ACV
- 14 IVECO Guarani 6x6
- 1 ASCOD ARV

Future assets:

- 14 IVECO Guarani 6x6

Former assets:

Colonial period

- Renault FT tank
- 75mm SPM
- Universal Carrier
- M8 armored car

Postcolonial period

- M4 Sherman
- M5 Stuart
- M24 Chaffee
- M41 Walker Bulldog
- M10 tank destroyer
- M18 Hellcat
- M36 tank destroyer
- M7 howitzer
- M8 armored car
- M16 Multiple Gun Motor Carriage
- M3 half-track
- M3 Scout Car

== Operations ==
- Anti-guerrilla operations against the New People's Army, MILF, and Abu Sayyaf Group.
