= Felimon Santos Jr. =

Filipino army general (born 1964)

Retired General Felimon T. Santos Jr. AFP
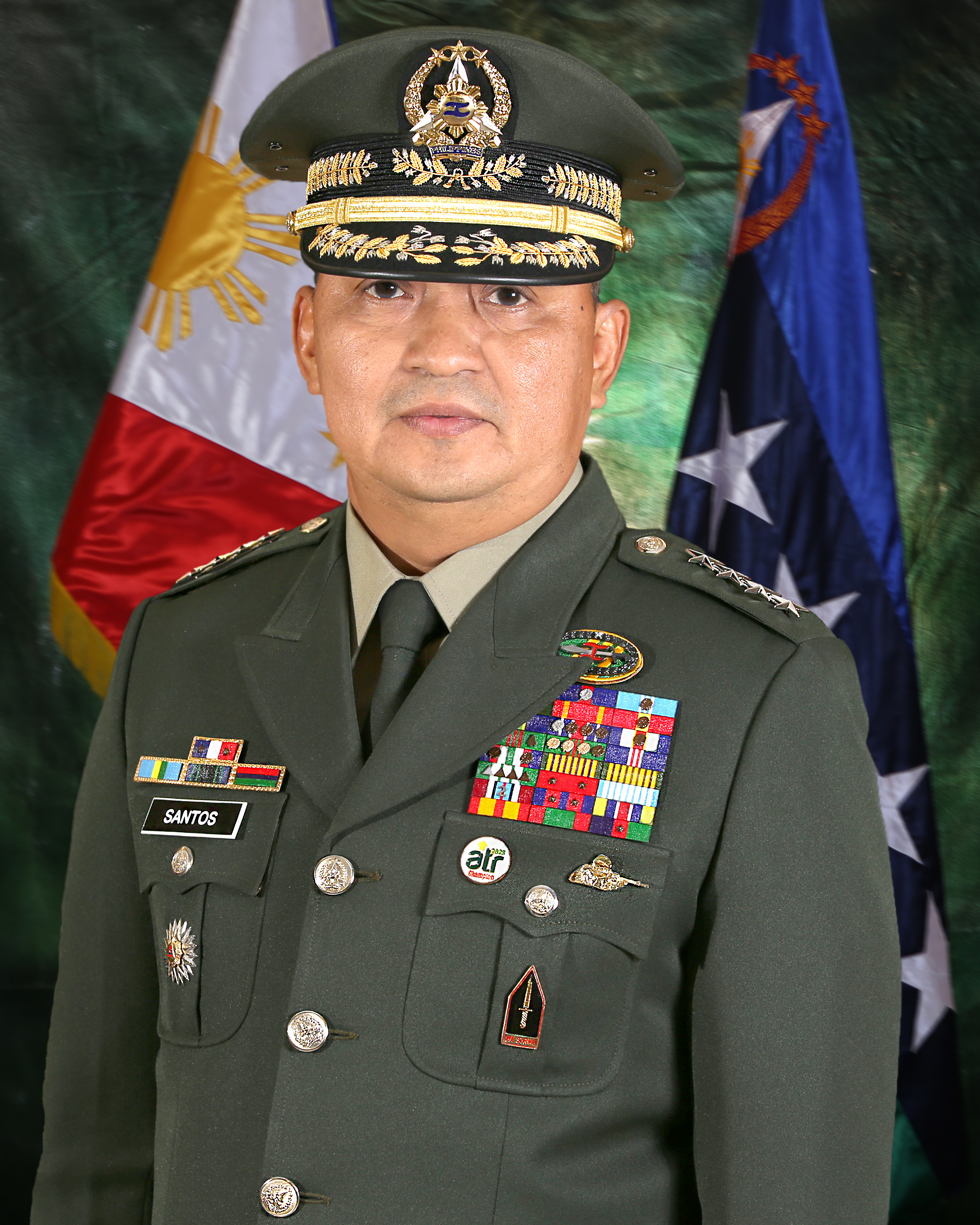

53rd Chief of Staff of the Armed Forces of the Philippines
- In office 4 January 2020 – 3 August 2020
- President: Rodrigo Duterte
- Preceded by: Gen. Noel Clement
- Succeeded by: Gen. Gilbert Gapay

Personal details
- Born: August 4, 1964 (age 62) San Rafael, Bulacan, Philippines
- Education: Philippine Military Academy

Military service
- Allegiance: Philippines
- Branch/service: Philippine Army
- Years of service: 1986–2020
- Rank: General
- Unit: Chief of Staff of the Armed Forces of the Philippines; AFP Eastern Mindanao Command; 7th Infantry Division; Deputy Chief of Staff for Intelligence, J2; Army Civil Military Operations Regiment; Army Intelligence & Security Group; 11th Intelligence Service Unit; Chief Military Personnel Officer, UNDOF; 703rd Infantry Brigade, 7 ID; 63rd Infantry Brigade, 8 ID
- Battles/wars: Moro conflict Communist rebellion in the Philippines; UNDOF, Golan Heights; Battle of Marawi

Felimon "Jun" Talusan Santos Jr. (born August 4, 1964) is a retired Filipino general who served as the former Chief of Staff of the Armed Forces of the Philippines. Prior to his appointment, he served as the commander of the AFP Eastern Mindanao Command, and the 7th Infantry Division. He is a graduate of the Philippine Military Academy "Sinagtala" Class of 1986.

== Early life and education ==
Santos was born on August 3, 1964, at San Rafael, Bulacan, and came from a family of farmers. He attended the Philippine Military Academy in 1982 and graduated in 1986 as part of the "Sinagtala" Class. He also holds a Master's degree in Management at the Philippine Christian University.

== Background ==
Santos commanded various units within the Philippine Army and the AFP, ranging from infantry, scout rangers, intelligence and field artillery units. He started his junior days as a platoon officer, executive officer and company commander at the 39th Infantry Battalion, 10 ID.

Santos also served as the Chief Military Personnel Officer for Filipino Peacekeepers in the United Nations Disengagement Observer Force in Golan Heights, and led the 11th Intelligence Service Unit based in Davao, and served as the Assistant Chief of Unified Command for Operations, U3 of the AFP Central Command.

Santos served as the commander of the 703rd Infantry Brigade of the 7th Infantry Division, Assistant Commander of the 6th Infantry Division, Commander and Group Commander of the Philippine Army Intelligence and Security Group and Commander of the Philippine Army Civil Military Operations Regiment.

During his stint as Commander of the Philippine Army Intelligence and Security Group, he was involved the capture of Benito and Wilma Tiamzon, two of the most high-ranking officials of the Communist Party of the Philippines in 2014. He became the Deputy Chief of Staff for Intelligence, J2 in November 2016 to October 2017, where he earned his 2nd star and was promoted to Major General. He was involved the arrest of Abu Sayyaf finance officer Khair Mundos. He also led intelligence operations against the Abu Sayyaf in Sulu Province, and during the Battle of Marawi, where he assisted the final operations against eliminating the main leaders of the terrorists who laid siege to Marawi City, Omar Maute and Isnilon Hapilon.

Santos became the commander of the 7th Infantry Division from October 2017 to January 2019, became the commander of the AFP Eastern Mindanao Command from January 2019 to January 2020, where he earned his third star and was promoted to Lieutenant General, before being promoted as the Chief of Staff of the Armed Forces of the Philippines on January 4, 2020, and obtained his fourth star, as well as promoted to the rank of General on January 27, 2020. On June 19, 2020, the position of Chief of Staff was renamed as Chairman of the Joint Chiefs, but was deferred a few months later. During his term as the AFP Chief, he spearheaded the disaster response operations in the aftermath of the 2020 Taal Volcano eruption and led overall medical and logistical support amidst the COVID-19 pandemic in the country.

Santos retired from military service on August 3, 2020, where he was replaced by his classmate, Gilbert Gapay.

== Awards and decorations ==
Left Side:

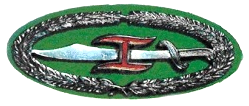

Badges	Combat Commander's Badge		
1st row		Chief Commander, Philippine Legion of Honor	1 Outstanding Achievement Medal
2nd row	6 Distinguished Service Stars with one silver anahaw cluster	2 Gold Cross Medals with one bronze anahaw cluster	3 Silver Cross Medals
3rd row	1 Meritorious Achievement Medal	2 Distinguished Service Medals with one bronze anahaw cluster	1 Chief of Staff of the AFP Commendation Medal
4th row	1 Gawad sa Kaunlaran	8 Bronze Cross Medals	3 Silver Wing Medal
5th row	Military Merit Medals with two spearhead devices, 40 overall total medals	Military Merit Medals with four silver and one bronze anahaws, 40 overall total medals	1 Sagisag ng Ulirang Kawal
6th row	3 Military Civic Action Medals	1st Parangal sa Kapanalig ng Sandatahang Lakas ng Pilipinas Medal	2nd Parangal sa Kapanalig ng Sandatahang Lakas ng Pilipinas Medal
7th row	10 Military Commendation Medals with one silver and three bronze triangular devices	United Nations Service Medal	Disengagement Observer Force Ribbon with Numeral 2 Device
8th row	2 Long Service Medal with two campaign stars	2 Anti-dissidence Campaign Medal with two campaign stars	1 Luzon Anti-Dissidence Campaign Medal
9th row	1 Visayas Anti-Dissidence Campaign Medal	1 Mindanao Anti-Dissidence Campaign Medal	Disaster Relief and Rehabilitation Operations Ribbon with one campaign star

Right Side:

1st row		Philippine Republic Presidential Unit Citation	
2nd row	People Power I Unit Citation	People Power II Unit Citation	Martial Law Unit Citation

Badges and Other Awards:

- Scout Ranger Qualification Badge
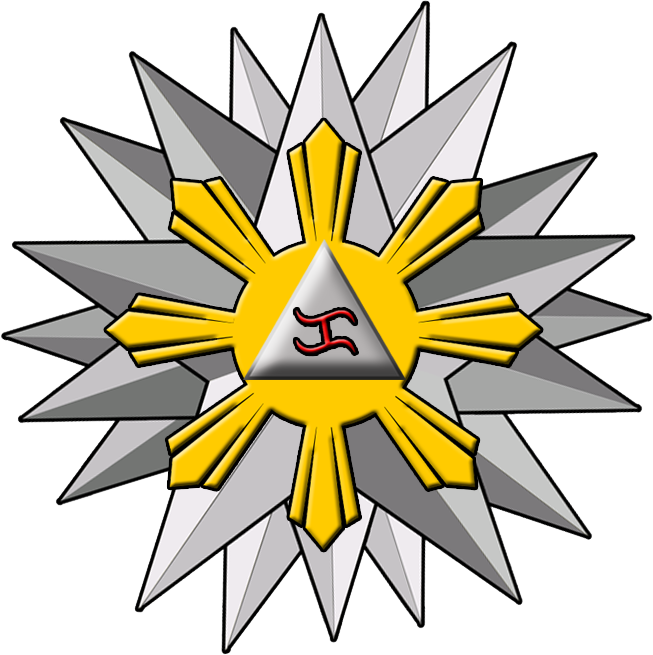
- AFP Command and General Staff Course Badge
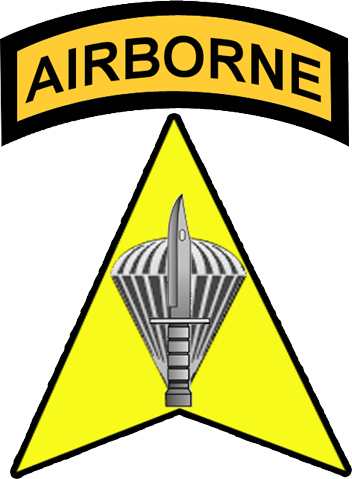
- Honorary Special Forces Regiment Badge
- Army Transformational Roadmap Badge
- Dangal ng Lipi of the Province of Bulacan

== Personal life ==
He is married to Margie Fe G. Santos, a native of Cotabato and a licensed nurse and businesswoman, and they have two daughters.

On March 27, 2020, he tested positive for COVID-19.
