= Naval Forces Eastern Mindanao =

- Active: September 3, 1991 - Present
- Country: Philippines
- Role: Conventional and Unconventional Warfare, Anti-Guerrilla Operations
- Part of: Under the Philippine Navy
- Garrison/HQ: Panacan, Davao City
- Nicknames: NFEM,NAVFOREASTMIN,EastMin Navy
- Motto: Naval Power in the South
- Mascot: Eastern Mindanao Archipelago
- Anniversaries: September 3
- Engagements: Anti-guerilla operations against the NPA, MILF, ASG, and local criminal elements

Commanders
- Current commander: CDRE Carlos V. Sabarre AFP

Insignia
- Unit Patch: Naval Forces Eastern Mindanao Command

Naval Forces Eastern Mindanao, (abbrv. as NAVFOREASTMIN), is one of the Philippine Navy's Force Commands combating terrorism and insurgency in Mindanao.

== Mission ==
Their mission is to conduct sustained Internal Security Operations (ISO) in Eastern Mindanao in the form of maritime support in order to neutralize the Communist-Terrorist Movement (CTM) and reduce their operational capabilities. One of their missions is to support local law enforcement as well as the Philippine National Police in containing the Moro Islamic Liberation Front while supporting the peace process; and destroy the Abu Sayyaf Group and the Jemaah Islamiya network operating in their area of operations. This is needed to establish a secured back door and maintain a physically and psychologically sound environment conducive to growth and development.

== Operations ==
- Anti-guerrilla operations against the New People's Army
- Anti-terrorist operations against the Abu Sayyaf operating in their area of responsibility.

== See also ==
- Rodrigo Duterte speech during a wake visit to killed-in-action NavForEastMin soldiers, August 2016
