= 103rd Technical & Administrative Services Group (Reserve) =

103 Technical & Administrative Services Group
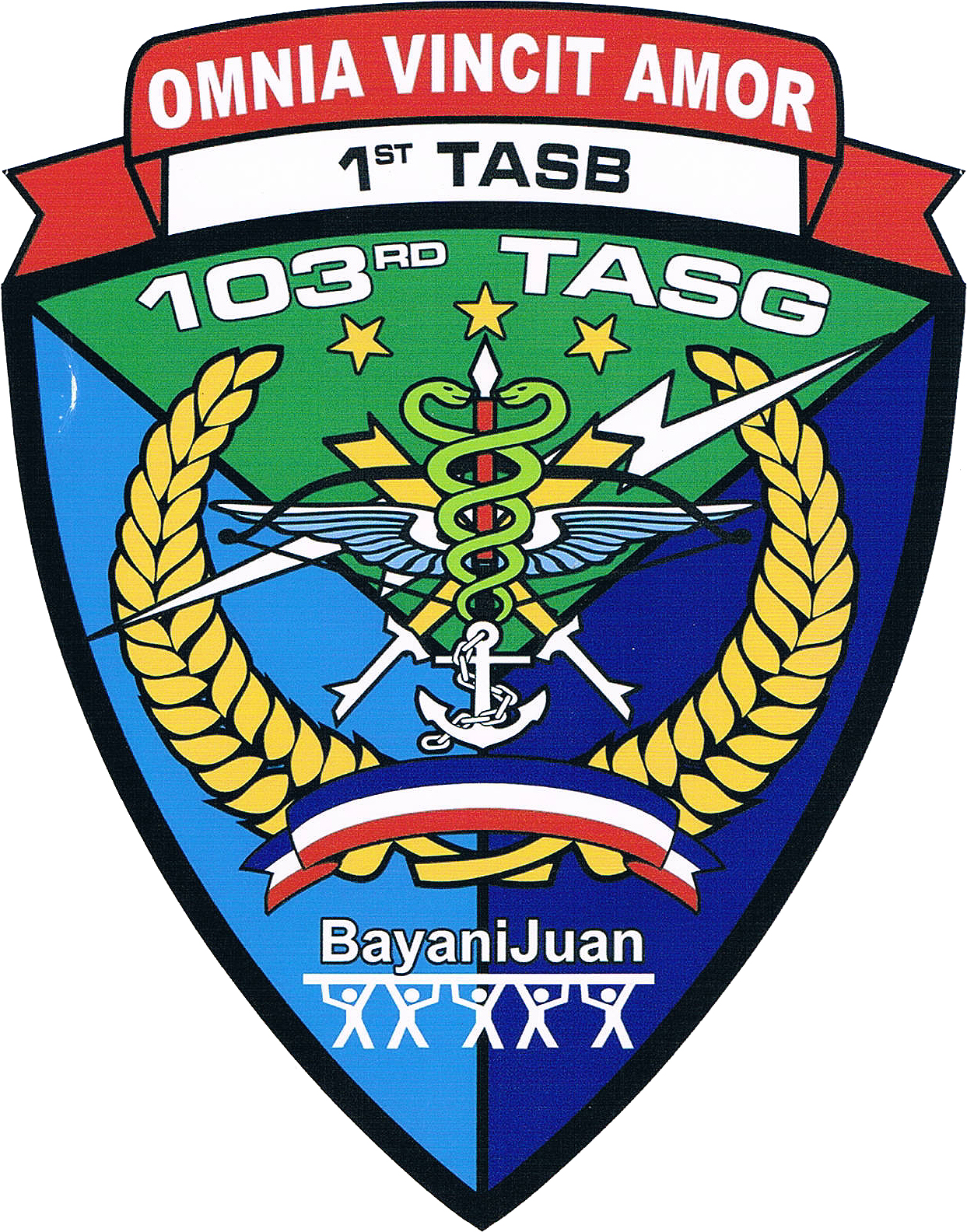
- Unit Seal of the 103rd Technical & Administrative Services Group (Reserve)
- Active: 01 April 1993
- Country: Philippines
- Allegiance: Republic of the Philippines
- Branch: Armed Forces of the Philippines
- Type: Technical Services Reserve; Technical Services
- Role: Combat Support and Combat Service Support, SAR and CSAR, Disaster Relief and Rehabilitation Operations, Civil-Military Operations and Civil-military Co-operations, Spec-Ops
- Size: 1 Headquarters & Headquarters Service Company, and 4 Technical & Administrative Services (Reserve) Units Companies
- Part of: Under the 1st Technical & Administrative Services Brigade (Reserve)
- Garrison/HQ: AFPRESCOM Cpd, CGEA, Quezon City
- Engagements: Coronavirus disease (COVID-19) pandemic
- Decorations: Philippine Republic Presidential Unit Citation Badge

Commanders
- Current commander: LTC ROMANO BAIS CHS (RES)
- Group Sergeant Major: MSg Jay R Tagle PA (Res)
- Notable commanders: MAJ NICODEMUS DE GUZMAN PA (RES)
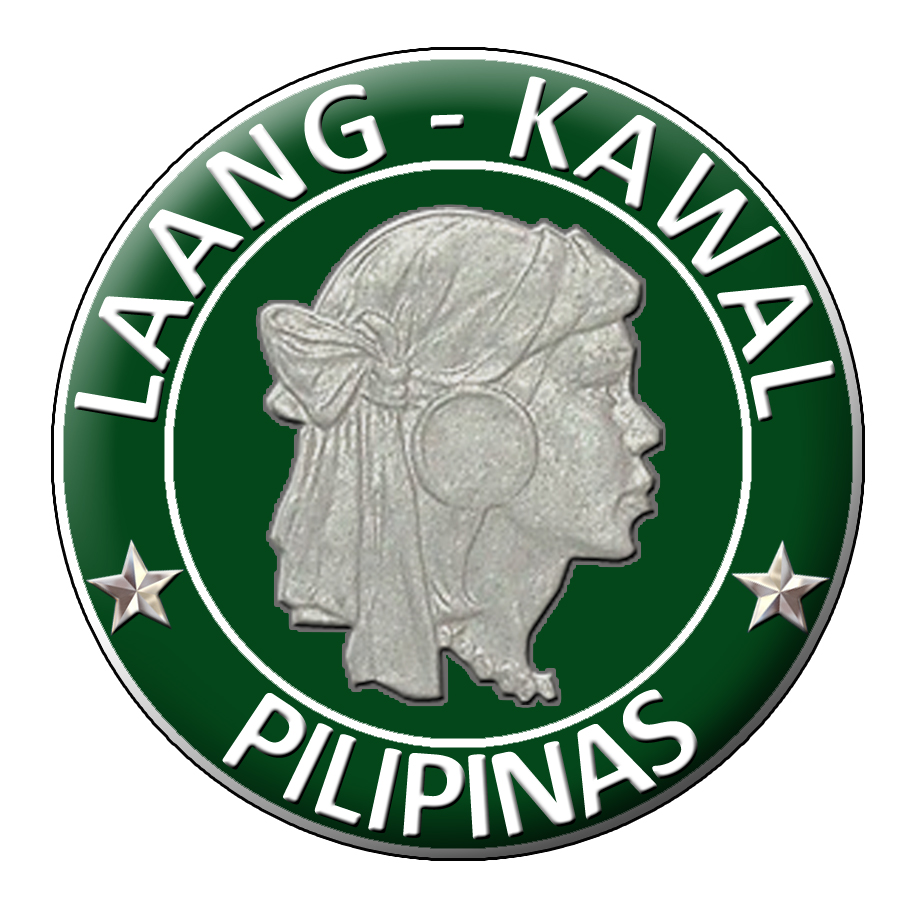
- Laang Kawal Seal

The 103rd Technical & Administrative Services Group, is one of five TAS units of the 1st Technical and Administrative Services Brigade (Reserve) of the AFP Reserve Command, and is based in Quezon City.

The AOR of the 103rd TAS Group covers the entirety of Caloocan, Malabon, Navotas, and Valenzuela. It is primarily tasked to support maneuver units of the AFP Reserve Force operating within these areas.

== Mission ==
- Base for expansion of the Regular Force in the event of war, invasion or rebellion within its AOP.
- Assist the Government in Relief and Rescue Operations in the event of Calamities or Disasters.
- Assist the Government in Socio-economic development and environmental concerns.
- Assist in the operation & maintenance of essential government and private utilities (e.g. power, telecommunications, water).

== The Commissioned Officer Corps ==
Officers of the 103TASG, AFPRESCOM are directly commissioned through AFP Circular Nr. 4 and 6 and may come from any of the following professions:

- Lawyers and Paralegal Specialists (Judge Advocate General Service)
- Medical Doctors (Medical Corps)
- Nurses (Nurse Corps)
- Dentists (Dental Service)
- Veterinarians (Veterinary Corps)
- Licensed Teachers (Corps of Professors)
- Allied Medical, Business, and Mass Communication Specialists (Medical Administrative Corps)
- Licensed Engineers (Corps of Engineers)
- Ordained Chaplains (Chaplain Service)

== See also ==
- AFP Reserve Command
- 105th Technical & Administrative Services Group (Reserve)
