= Armed Forces of the Philippines Reserve Command =

Reserve Command, Armed Forces of the Philippines
- Pangasiwaan ng Panlaang Kawal ng Sandatahang Lakas ng Pilipinas
- Active: April 1, 1993 - Present
- Country: Philippines
- Allegiance: Republic of the Philippines
- Branch: Technical & Administrative Service Branch
- Type: Reserve Force
- Role: Combat Support & Service Support, Force Multiplier, Training, Disaster Rescue & Relief, and Community Service
- Size: approx. 1,200,000+ Reservists (as of June 2023); 86,000+ in Ready Reserve Status (including Affiliated Reserve Units); 1,100,000+ in Standby Reserve Status
- Part of: Under the Armed Forces of the Philippines
- Garrison/HQ: RESCOM, AFP Compound, Camp General Emilio Aguinaldo, Quezon City
- Nickname: AFPRESCOM
- Mottos: Laang Kawal; Volunteer Soldier
- Colors: Prussian Green, Navy Blue, Sky Blue/Air Force Blue
- March: Sulong Tulong Mga Laang Kawal (Forward to Help, Volunteer Soldiers) (The AFP Reservist March)
- Anniversaries: April 1
- Decorations: Philippine Republic Presidential Unit Citation Badge

Commanders
- Current commander: BGEN Arnel B. Bautista PA

Insignia
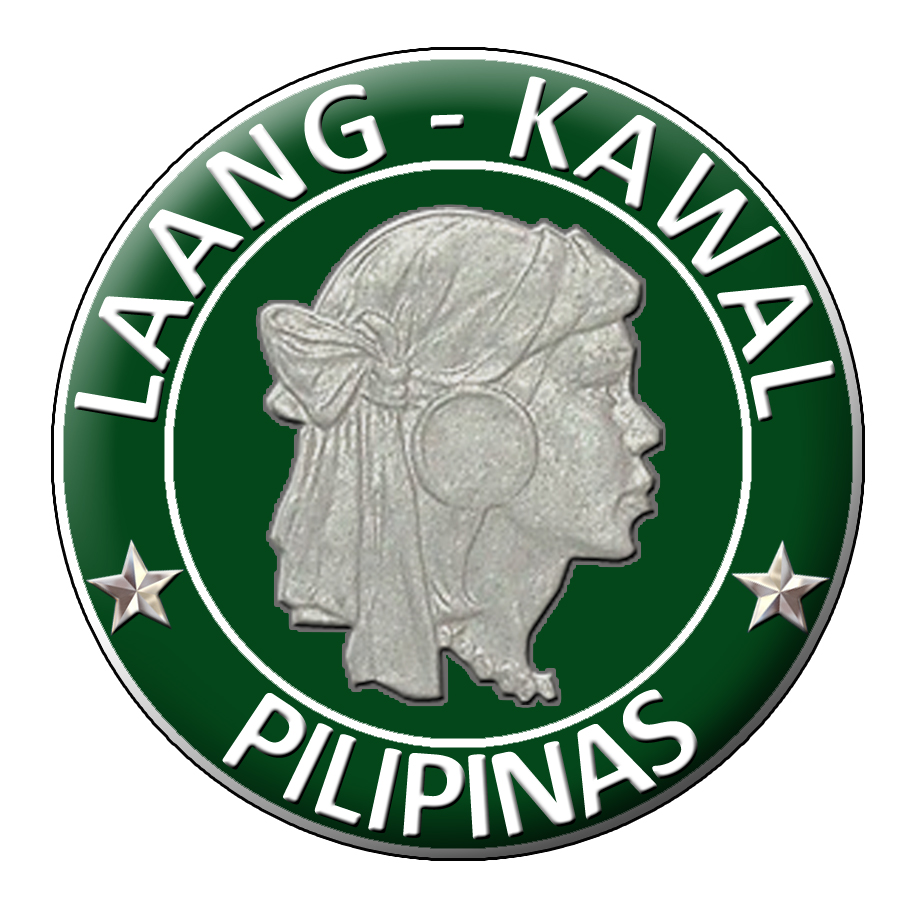
- AFP Reserve Force Shoulder Sleeve Insignia

The Armed Forces of the Philippines Reserve Command, known officially as RESCOM, AFP (Filipino: Pangasiwaan ng Panlaang Kawal ng Sandatahang Lakas ng Pilipinas) is one of the Armed Forces of the Philippines' Major Support Commands created for the sole purpose of Reserve Force management, procurement, and organization.

== Training ==
Training of Citizen Soldiers (colloquially known as "Reservists") is the major task handled by RESCOM, AFP. Its primary modes of enlisting reservists are the Basic Citizens Military Training (BCMT) for civilians from all walks of life, and the Military Orientation Training (MOT) for private companies who are designated as AFP Affiliated Reserve Units (AFPARUs). Graduates are given enlisted ranks based on reciprocity of their civilian experience in the military environment.

Reserve officers are commissioned based on Armed Forces of the Philippines policy on (direct) commissionship in the Reserve Force known as Circular Nr 4 series of July 2010. Those who are commissioned through this source subsequently undergo an officer orientation program. Many officers in the RESCOM, AFP are licensed physicians, dentists, nurses, pharmacists, teachers, lawyers, and chaplains. Some are directly commissioned as Lieutenant Colonels through the commissioning program of National Defense College of the Philippines as graduates of the Masters in National Security Administration (MNSA).

Other than time-in-grade and merit promotions, rank adjustments are authorized depending on civilian qualifications.

== Specialization Training ==
These are the trainings available for military reserves at RESCOM, AFP:

- SFOOT (UWOC) - Special Forces Operations Orientation Training (Unconventional Warfare Operations Course)

Trainer: Philippine Army (PA) Special Forces

- EORA - Explosives Ordnance Reconnaissance Agent Course

Trainer : 710th Special Operations Wing (SPOW). Philippine Air Force (PAF)

- SCUBA Combat Diver Course

Trainer: AFPRESCOM SCUBA Diver/Naval Special Operations Command (NAVSOCOM), Philippine Navy (PN)

- Specialized CMO - Civil Military Affairs Orientation Course

Trainer: Philippine Army (PA) CMOG School

- K-9 Handling Course

Trainer: Philippine Army (PA)

- VIP Security Protection Course

Trainer: PA SEG in coordination with PNP CSG

- SROOT (formerly SROC) - Scout Ranger Operations Orientation Training

Trainer: 1st Scout Ranger Regiment (FSRR), Philippine Army (PA)

- Field Artillery Orientation Course

Trainer: Army Artillery "King of Battle" Regiment (AAR), Philippine Army (PA)

- Light Mechanized Infantry Orientation Training

Trainer: Armor "Pambato" Division, Philippine Army (PA)

- AGOS - Air-to-Ground Operations System Orientation course

Trainer: Philippine Air Force (PAF)

- USAR - Urban Search and Rescue Training

Trainer: well-trained and professional TASBde personnel and ATG Training staff

- WASAR - Water Search and Rescue Training

Trainer: well-trained and professional TASBde personnel and ATG Training staff

== Types of Reservists ==
There are currently two (2) types of reservists in the component of the Armed Forces of the Philippines (AFP) Reserve Force:

- Ready Reservists - physically fit and tactically current reservist personnel that are always on constant alert and training; and ready to mobilize once a mobilization order has been given.
- Standby Reservists - reservist personnel who do not maintain currency in specialization qualifications but the base for expansion, support and augmentation to the Ready Reserve Force as needed.

== The Commissioned Officer Corps ==
Most of the officers of AFPRESCOM are directly commissioned through AFP Circular Nr. 4 and 6 and may come from any of the following professions, :

- Lawyers and Paralegal Specialists (Judge Advocate General Service)
- Medical Doctors (Medical Corps)
- Nurses (Nurse Corps)
- Dentists (Dental Service)
- Veterinarians (Veterinary Corps)
- Licensed Teachers (Corps of Professors)
- Allied Medical, Business, and Mass Communication Specialists (Medical Administrative Corps)
- Licensed Engineers (Corps of Engineers)
- Ordained Chaplains (Chaplain Service)

== Lineage of Commanding Officers ==
Commanding Officers of the AFPRESCOM are drawn from all the Service Commands of the AFP. The commanding officer is appointed and reports directly to the Chairman of the Joint Chiefs.

Tenure begin	Tenure end	Rank	Name	Branch of Service
		BGEN	Cesar A. Abella, AFP	
		BGEN	Froilan M. Maglaya, AFP	
		BGEN	Joel A. Cabides, AFP	
		BGEN	Juanito W. Dalmas, AFP	
		BGEN	Lito S. Tabangcura, AFP	
		BGEN	Quirino S. Calonzo, AFP	
		BGEN	Alex C. Capiña, AFP	
		BGEN	Johnny L. Macanas, AFP	
5 Sep 2015	28 Oct 2016	BGEN	Leoncio A. Cirunay Jr., AFP	PA
28 Oct 2016		COL	Pascual Luis D. Bedia	PA
		BGEN	Noel S. Buan	PA
1 Jun 2018	2 Aug 2019	BGEN	Rolando R. Rodil	PA
2 Aug 2019	1 Dec 2021	BGEN	Ferdinand M. Fraginal	PN(M)
1 Dec 2021	14 Aug 2024	BGEN	Vicente M. Ronatay	PN(M)
14 Aug 2024	10 Oct 2026	BGEN	Ferdinand Geminic P. Ramirez	PA
10 Oct 2026	9 Nov 2026	COL	Jose Tadeo M. Javier II (acting)	PAF
9 Nov 2026	present	BGEN	Arnel B. Bautista	PA

== Organization ==
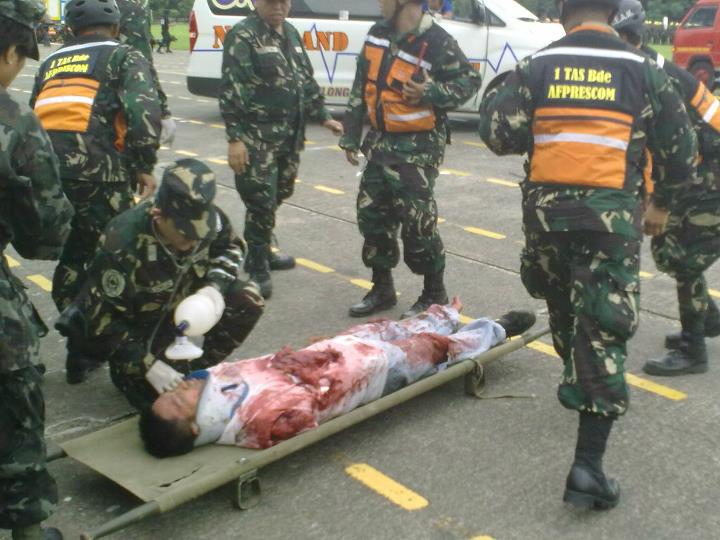
Officers and Enlisted Personnel of the 1st TAS Brigade conduct Disaster Response Drills at Camp Aguinaldo.

=== Base Units ===
- Headquarters & Headquarters Service Group
- AFPRESCOM Training Group (ATG)
- AFPRESCOM Affiliated Reserve Group (ARG)
- AFPRESCOM Technical and Administrative Services Reserve Group (TASRG)

=== Civil Military Reserve Units ===
- Civil Military Affairs Brigade (CMABde)

=== Technical Service Reserve Units ===
- 1st Technical & Administrative Service Brigade, National Capital Region (Reserve)
  - 101st Technical & Administrative Services Group (Reserve)
  - 102nd Technical & Administrative Services Group (Reserve)
  - 103rd Technical & Administrative Services Group (Reserve)
  - 104th Technical & Administrative Services Group (Reserve)
  - 105th Technical & Administrative Services Group (Reserve)
- 2nd Technical & Administrative Service Brigade, Northern Luzon (Reserve)
- 3rd Technical & Administrative Services Brigade, Southern Luzon (Reserve)
- 4th Technical & Administrative Services Brigade, Western (Reserve)
- 5th Technical & Administrative Services Brigade, Central (Reserve)
- 6th Technical & Administrative Services Brigade, Eastern Mindanao (Reserve)
- 7th Technical & Administrative Services Brigade, Western Mindanao (Reserve)

=== Affiliated Reserve Units ===
- 1st AFP (TALON) General Hospital
- 1st AFP (UPHS) Affiliated Reserve Medical Center
- 1st (ARMSCOR) Arsenal Battalion (Reserve)
- 1st (NGCP) AFP Power Division (Reserve)
- 1st AFP (NCST) Educational & Training Battalion (Reserve)
- 2nd AFP (SLH) Affiliated Reserve Medical Center
- 404th (SOLARWINDS) Transport Battalion (Reserve)
- 405th (SHAHIN) Transport Battalion (Reserve)
- 501st (LWUA) Water Battalion (Reserve)
- 502nd (MAYNILAD) Water Service Battalion (Reserve)
- 503rd (Manila Water) Water Service Battalion (Reserve)
- 506th (NIA) Water Service Battalion (Reserve)
- 602nd (VMMC) Medical Service Battalion
- 701st (PHILCCOM) Signal Battalion (Reserve)
- 856th (G-BBC) Engineering & Construction Battalion (Reserve)
- 903rd (KPI) Signal Battalion (Reserve)
- 704th (RCCI) Commo-Battalion (Reserve)
- 409th (ACE) Transport-Battalion (Reserve)
- 408th (Flying "A") Transport-Battalion (Reserve)
- 855th (AYIN) Electrical Engineering Service Battalion (Reserve)
- 856th (G-BBDC) Engineering and Construction Battalion (Reserve)

=== Standby Reserve Units ===
- Standby Reserve Battalion

== Awards and decorations ==
Currently Awarded on April 15, 2017, the "Award of Excellence" with the highest score of 96.84% during the Annual General Inspection 2016 conducted by the Office of the Inspector General AFP headed by newly installed commander Inspector General of the Armed Forces of the Philippines, MGEN OSCAR T LACTAO AFP at AFPRESCOM Compound, CGEA, QC

=== Campaign streamers ===
Award Streamer	Streamer Name	Operation	Date Awarded	Reference
	Presidential Unit Citation Badge	SAR/DRR Ops, TS Ketsana & TS Parma	February 4, 2010	General Orders No. 112, GHQ-AFP, dtd Feb 4 '10
	Presidential Unit Citation Badge	General Elections, Philippines	July 1, 2010	General Orders No. 641, GHQ-AFP, dtd July 1 '10

=== Badges ===
Military Badge	Badge Name	Operation	Date Awarded	Reference
	AFP Election Duty Badge	General Elections, Philippines	May 21, 2010	General Orders No. 513, GHQ-AFP, dtd May 21 '10

== See also ==
- Philippine Army Reserve Command
- Philippine Air Force Reserve Command
- Philippine Navy Reserve Command
- Philippine Coast Guard Auxiliary
