= Bio bus =

Bio bus may refer to:

- BioBus, an American science education vehicle
- Bio-Bus, a British bus powered by human faeces and food waste
