= Civil Military Affairs Brigade (Reserve) =

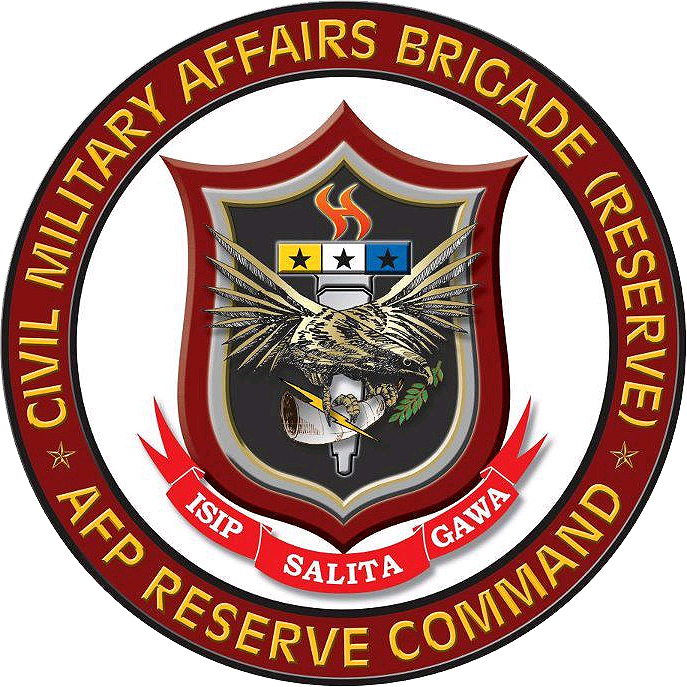
- Unit seal
- Active: September 1999 – present
- Country: Philippines
- Allegiance: Republic of the Philippines
- Branch: Armed Forces of the Philippines
- Type: Technical and Administrative Services Reserve; Civil Military Affairs Services
- Role: Combat support, combat service support, service support, search and rescue (SAR), combat search and rescue (CSAR), disaster relief, rehabilitation operations, and civil–military operations
- Size: 1 Command Group, 8 Civil Military Affairs Groups, 1 Information Development Group, 1 Media Affairs Group, and 1 Headquarters and Headquarters Service Group
- Part of: AFP Reserve Command Technical and Administrative Services Reserve Group
- Garrison/HQ: Camp Aguinaldo, Quezon City
- Nicknames: CMA BDE; Civil Military Affairs Brigade
- Mottos: Isip, Salita, at Gawa "Thoughts, Words, and Actions"; Pensamientos, Palabras y Acciones
- Mascot: Philippine serpent eagle
- Anniversaries: Coincides with the observance of National Reservist Week
- Decorations: Philippine Republic Presidential Unit Citation

Commanders
- Current commander: BGen Gerard V. Velez, PA (Res)
- Notable commanders: BGen Joseph G. Sevilla, PA (Res); BGen Emmanuel Joaquin B. Guina, PA (Res)

Insignia
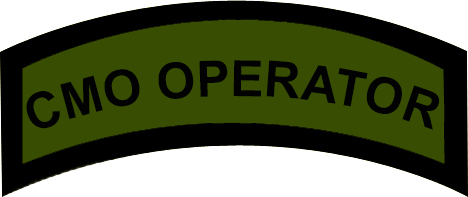
- Civil-Military Operations Tab

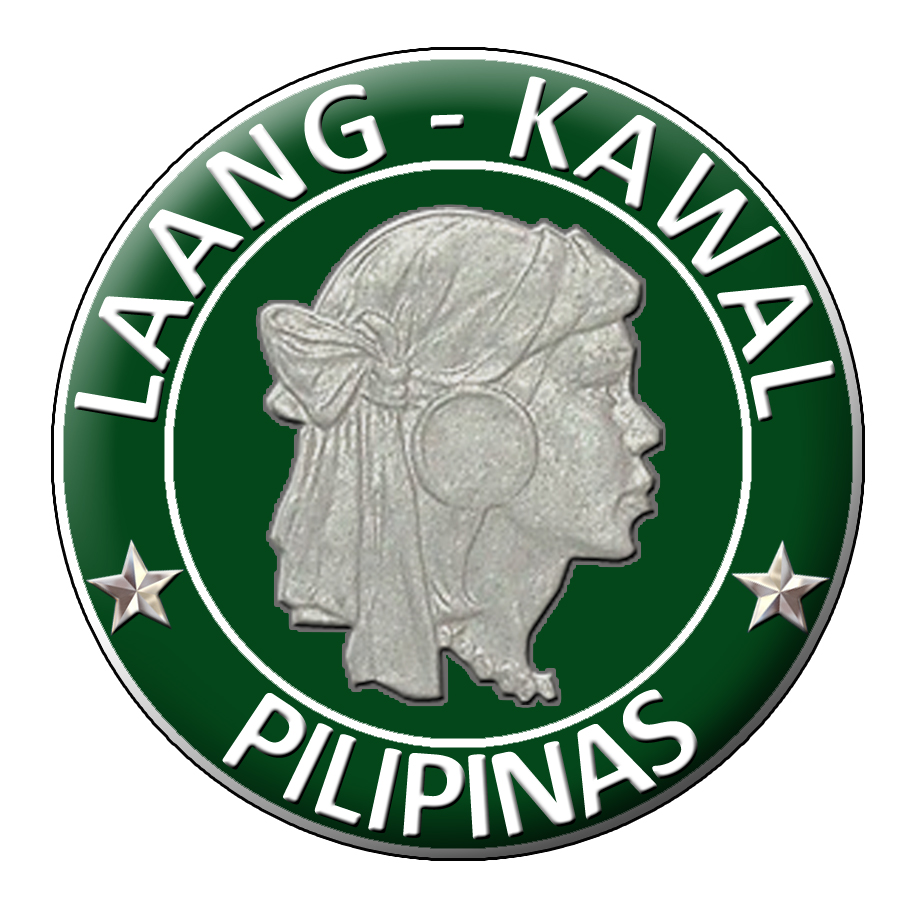
- Laang Kawal Seal

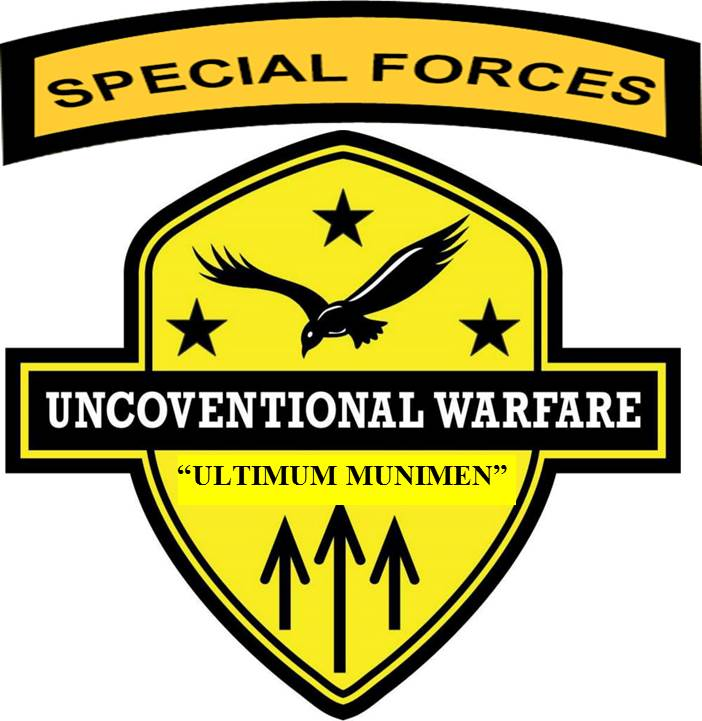
- Special Forces–Unconventional Warfare Operations Tab

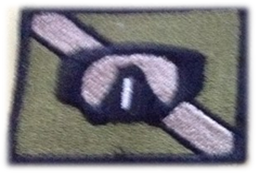
- AFPRESCOM Scuba Diving Badge

The Civil Military Affairs Brigade (Reserve) is a Ready Reserve unit of the Armed Forces of the Philippines Reserve Command. It is one of the units of the Technical and Administrative Services Reserve Group and is headquartered at Camp Aguinaldo in Quezon City. The brigade provides combat support, combat service support, and service support to AFP Reserve Force maneuver units, and conducts civil–military operations, community development operations, and humanitarian assistance and disaster relief operations.

== Commanders ==
Unit Designation: Public Affairs Group (Reserve)

- Colonel Jesus G. Czabarrus (GSC) PAF (RES) - February 1997 to June 2005

Unit Designation: Public Affairs Service (PAS)(Reserve)

- Colonel Eduardo L. Lacañeta MNSA (GSC) PN (RES) - June 2005 to November 2009

Unit Designation: Civil Military Affairs Brigade (Reserve)

- Brigadier General Joseph G. Sevilla AFP (RES) - November 2009 to November 2011
- Commodore Enrico Juan P. Talon AFP (RES) - November 2011 to 15 May 2015
- Brigadier General Emmanuel Joaquin B. Guina AFP (RES) - 15 May 2015 to 18 May 2019
- Brigadier General Gerard V. Velez PA (RES) - 18 May 2019 to date

== Brigade Sergeant Majors ==
- SMS Napoleon Mantilla (Res) PA - November 2009 to November 2011(Deceased)
- MSg Gaudencio Eleazar N Manalac (Res) PA - November 2011 to 2015
- MSg Dionisio B Avila Jr PA(Res). May 2015 to May 2019
- CPO Arnel S Cruz PN (Res) - 25 May 2019 to date

== Organization ==
The following are the units of the Civil Military Affairs Brigade:

Headquarters Units:

- Command Group
- Headquarters & Headquarters Support Group
- Media Affairs Group
- Information Development Group

=== Field line units ===
- 1st Civil Military Affairs Group (Reserve) National Capital Region
- 2nd Civil Military Affairs Group (Reserve) Northern Luzon
- 3rd Civil Military Affairs Group (Reserve) Southern Luzon
- 4th Civil Military Affairs Group (Reserve) Palawan
- 5th Civil Military Affairs Group (Reserve) Visayas
- 6th Civil Military Affairs Group (Reserve) Eastern Mindanao
- 7th Civil Military Affairs Group (Reserve) Western Mindanao
- 8th Civil Military Affairs Group (Reserve)

== Training ==
- Civil Military Affairs Operation Course
- Civil Affairs Orientation Training
- Special Forces Operations Orientation Training (Unconventional Warfare Operations Course)
- Scuba Diving Course
- Explosives Ordnance Reconnaissance Agent Course
- K-9 Handling Course
- VIP Security Protection Course
- Air-to-Ground Operations System Orientation course

== Awards and decorations ==
=== Campaign streamers ===
Award streamer	Streamer name	Operation	Date awarded	Reference
	Presidential Unit Citation Badge	SAR/DRR Ops, TS Ketsana	4 February 2010	General Orders No. 112, GHQ-AFP, dtd 04 Feb '10
	Presidential Unit Citation Badge	General Elections, Philippines	1 July 2010	General Orders No. 641, GHQ-AFP, dtd 1 July '10

=== Badges ===
Military badge	Badge name	Operation	Date awarded	Reference
	AFP Election Duty Badge	General Elections, Philippines	21 May 2010	General Orders No. 513, GHQ-AFP, dtd 21 May '10

AFPRESCOM 2025 Best Ready Reserve Umit - Brigade Level

AFP NRW 2025 Best Ready Reserve Unit - Brigade / Wing Level

== Gallery ==
Miscellaneous gallery

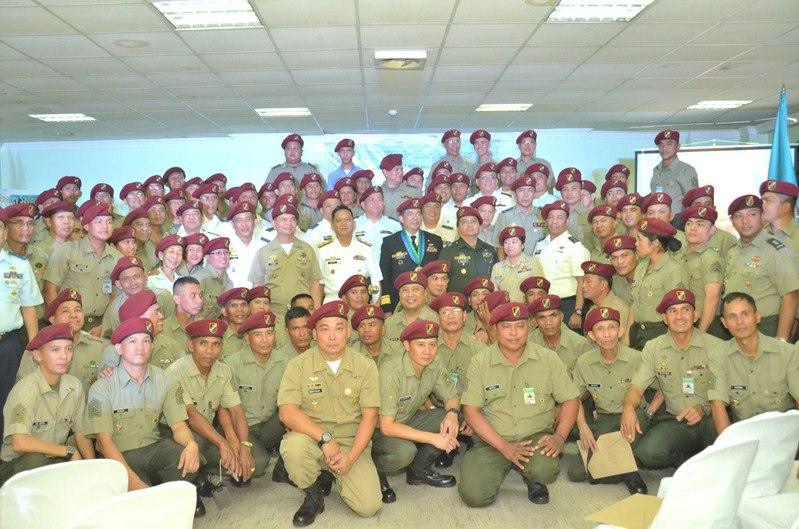
Civil Military Affairs Operations Course Graduation December 2012 with Radm Miguel Jose S Rodriguez AFP Deputy Chief of Staff for Civil Military Operations, J7 as Guest of Honor, MGEN MARLOU S SALAZAR AFP DCS for Reservist & Retirees Affairs, J9 and COL QUIRINO S CALONZO PA (GSC) Commander AFPRESCOM

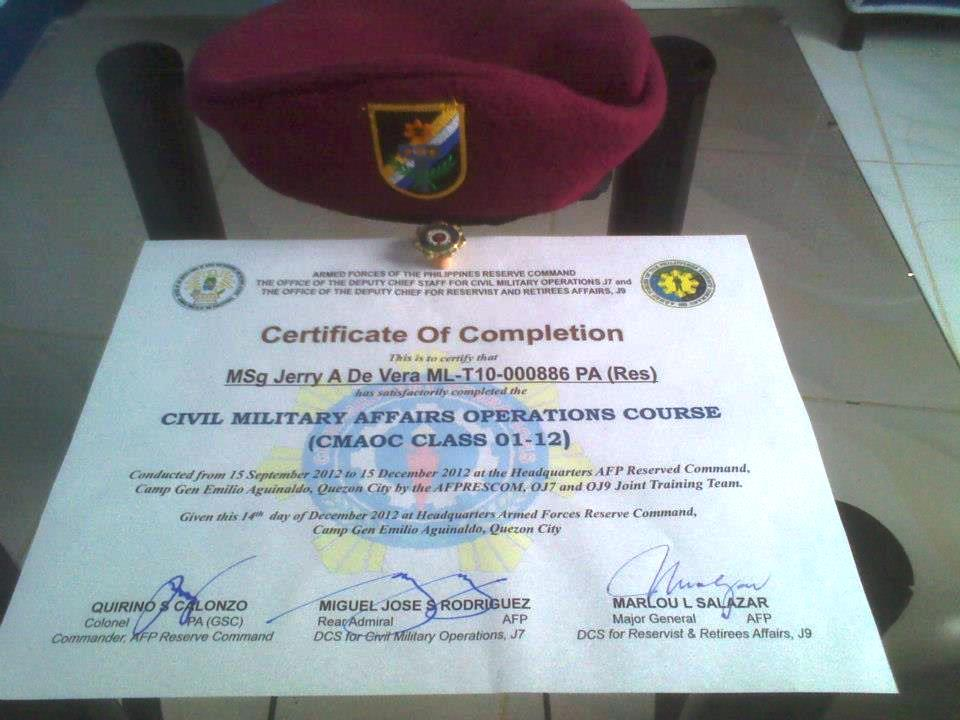
CMAOC maroon berret, CMO badge and certificate

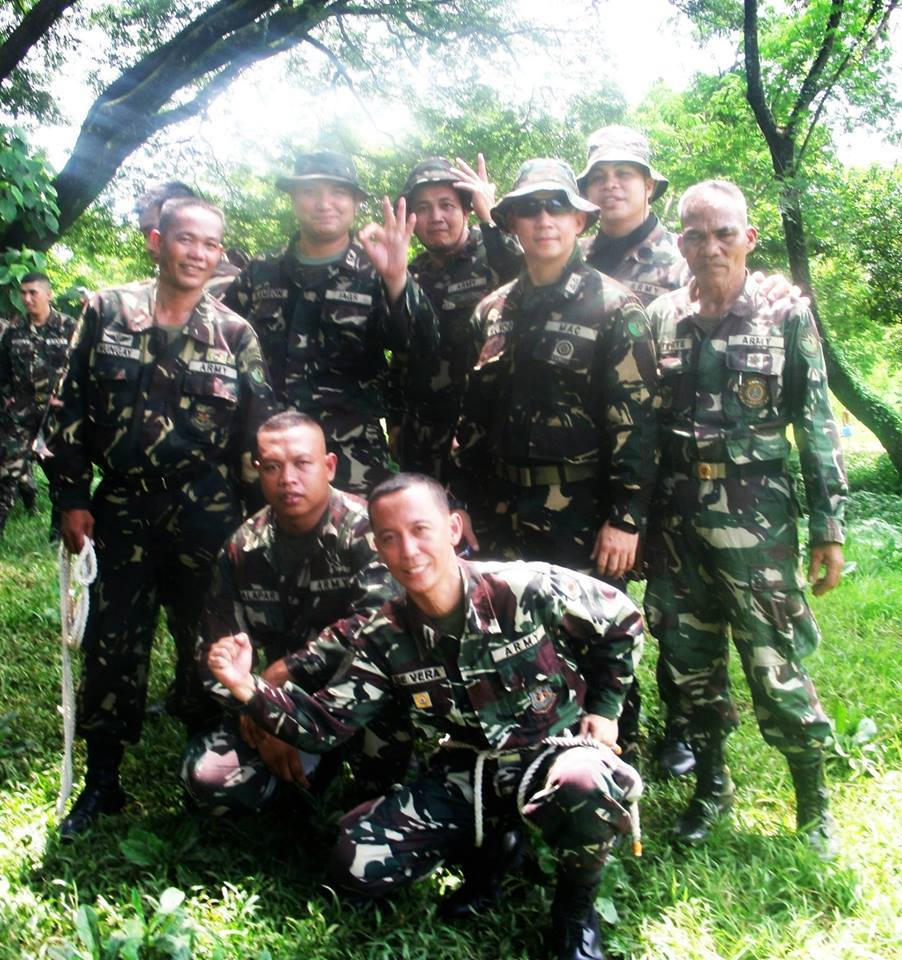
Special Forces Operations Orientation Training – Unconventional Warfare Operations Course Graduation Day

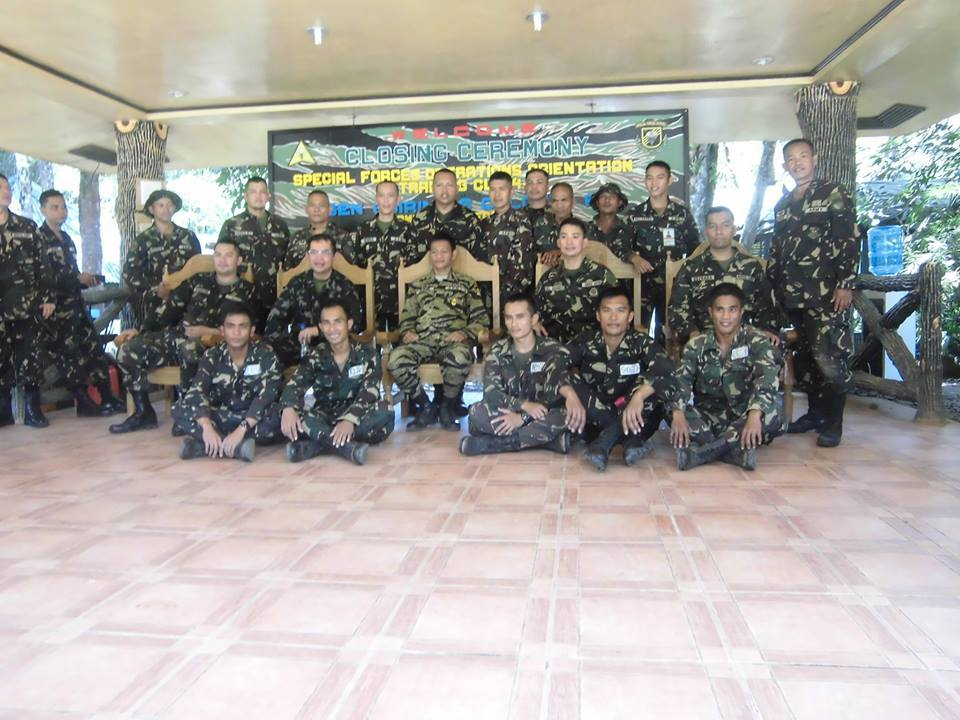
Special Forces Operations Orientation Training CL 04-13 September 7, 2013 Taken at Fort Magsaysay, Nueva Ecija Unconventional Warfare operations Course – Unconventional Warfare Operations Course Specialist.

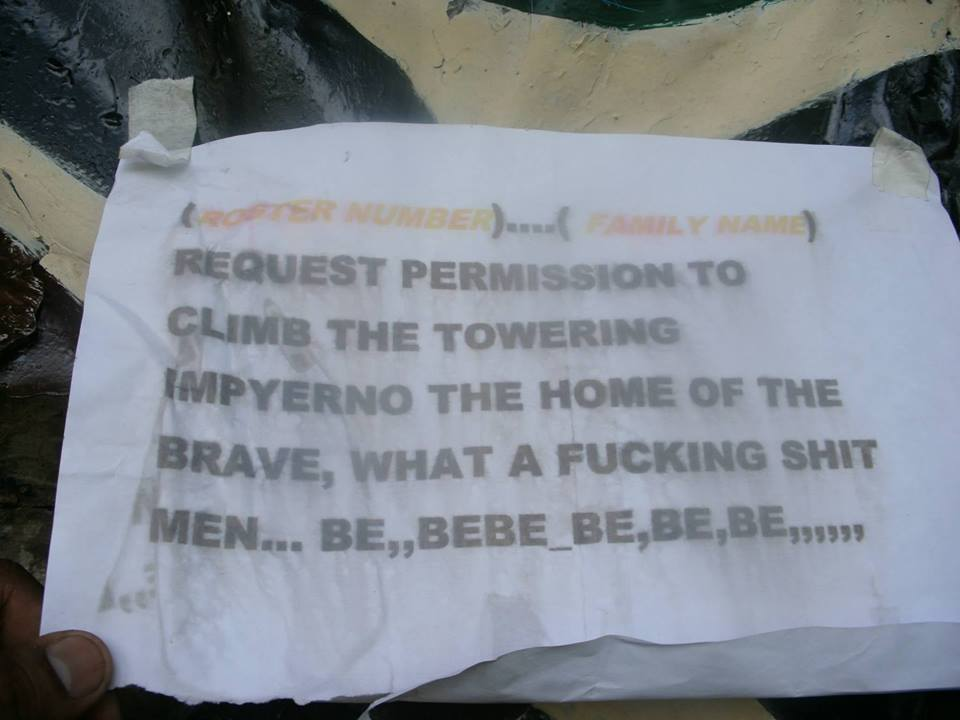
Special Forces Operations Orientation Training – Unconventional Warfare Operations Course

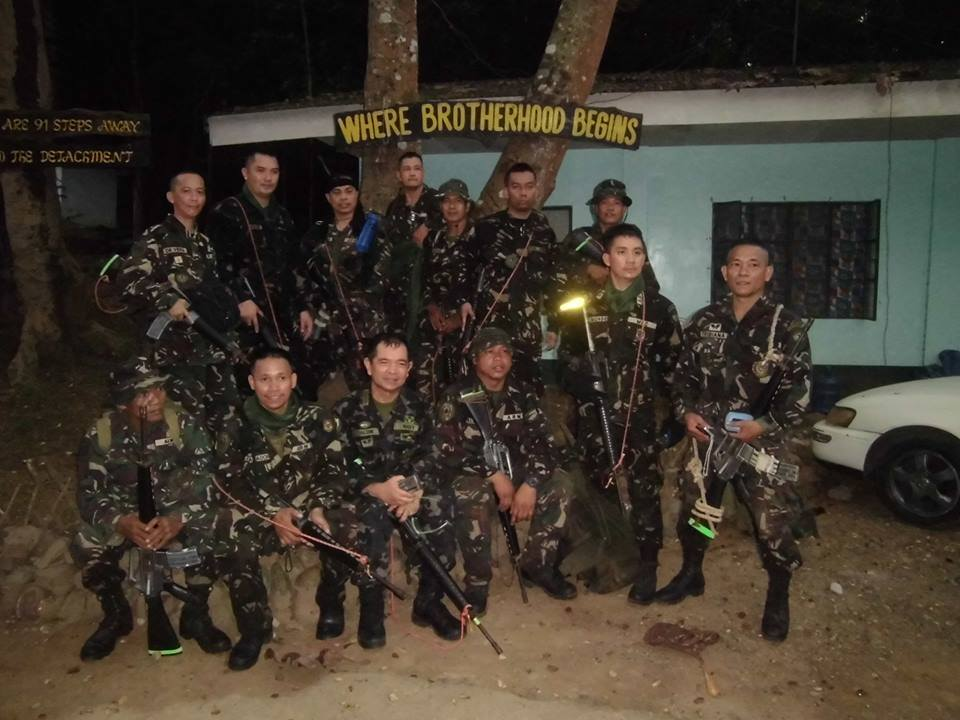
Special Forces Operations Orientation Training CL 04–13 September 7, 2013 "Where Brotherhood Begins"

== See also ==
- AFP Reserve Command
