= Hellenic Army Veterinary Service =

Veterinary arm of the Greek Army

- Active: 1904–present
- Country: Greece
- Allegiance: Hellenic Army
- Role: Animal healthcare

The Hellenic Army Veterinary Service (Greek: Κτηνιατρική Υπηρεσία Στρατού, romanized: Ktiniatriki Ypiresia Stratou) is a service of the Greek Army responsible for the training and care of animals. The Hellenic Army Veterinary Service was established as an independent unit in 1904, mainly focusing on the treatment of equidae until the 1950s. The modernization of the Greek military led to the gradual shift of its role to veterinary public health.

== History ==
=== Early period ===
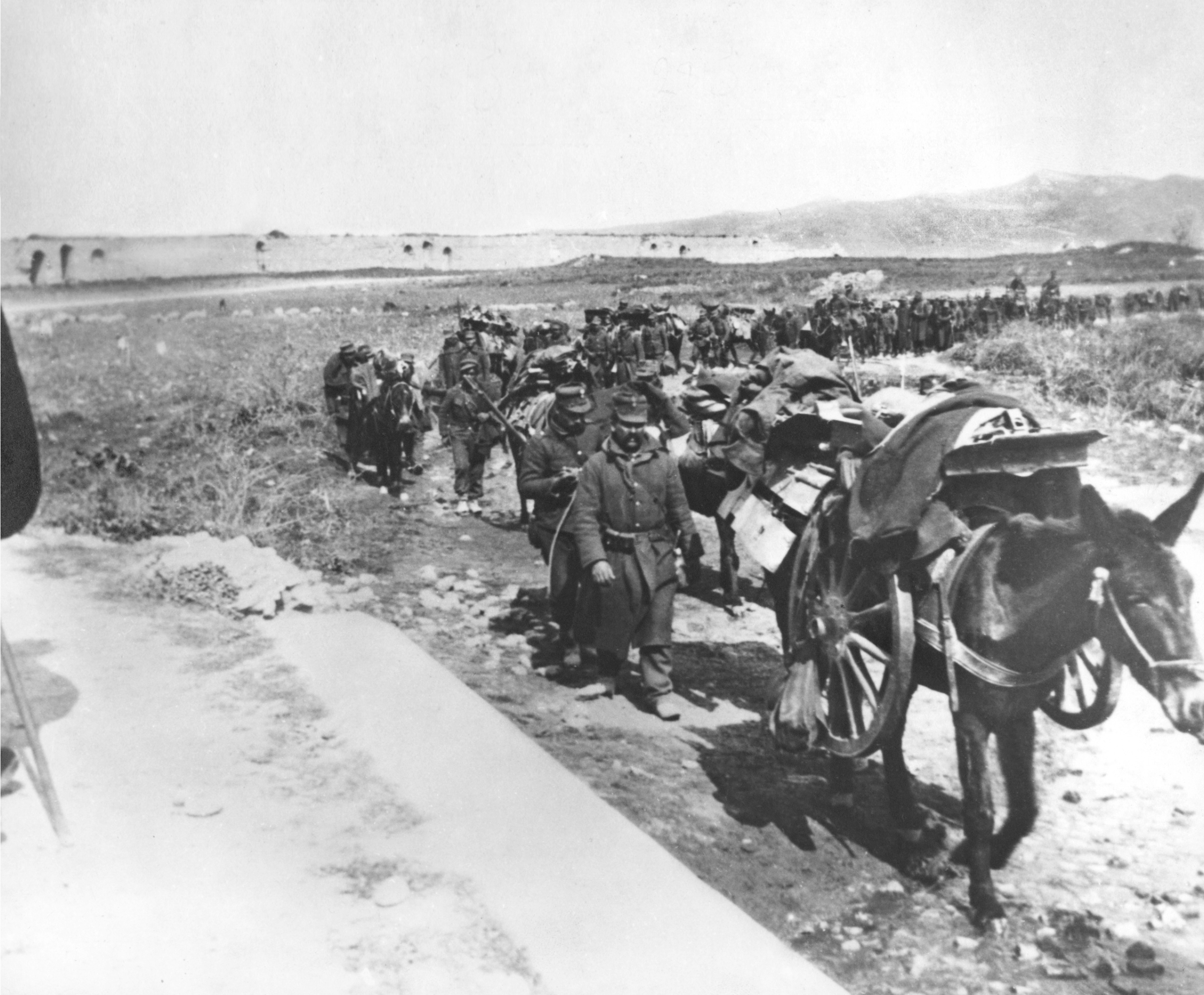
A donkey-borne supply column of the Greek Army during the Balkan Wars

At the time of the declaration of the First Hellenic Republic, Greece did not have a statuary body regulating veterinary medicine. Throughout the 19th century veterinary science was primary practiced by folk healers with no formal education who used traditional medicine of dubious quality standards. The first trained veterinarian in Greece was Bavarian Georg Horsch, who was attached to a Lancer Regiment of the Hellenic Army in November 1832. A few months later his position was officially confirmed in the structure of the Greek armed forces. In 1837, Horsch was promoted to the rank of Major and was appointed lecturer in hippiatrics at the Ministry of Military Affairs. Thus marking the beginning of formal instruction of Greek military veterinarians.

Emmanouel Pyllas and Nikolaos Kordikas were the first Greeks to receive a degree in veterinary science. The latter enlisted in the Greek military in 1844. In 1853, he published the Hippiatrics, the first veterinary book in modern Greek history. In 1859, Kordikas succeeded Horsch as lecturer in hippiatrics. In 1875, Georgios Pilavios enlisted in the Greek military, he is considered to be the founder of the Hellenic Army Veterinary Service. During the 19th century the primary focus of Greek military veterinarians was the treatment of equidae. There were under six civilian veterinarians in the entire country, while the number of military veterinarians was likewise insufficient to cover the needs of the Greek armed forces even during periods of peace. Pilavios wrote numerous scientific works on the topic of veterinary science bringing wider awareness about the topic among the Greek military and political elites.

In 1887, Pilavios published Creoscopy Manual a book about food safety in the meat-packing industry which was the only instructional Greek book on the topic for many decades. In 1895, creoscopy officer Ioannis Petridis convinced the Athenian authorities to move the city's abattoir from Gargareta to Tavros. Petridis also facilitated the extension of food safety regulations to all animal products and the establishment of mandatory tuberculosis check ups at dairy farms. During this period, Greek military veterinarians also worked in clinics specializing in the treatment of rabies, smallpox inoculation and contributed to contagious disease control among privately held animals. Starting from 1890, the lecturer in hippiatrics also became responsible for teaching equine science. From 1900 and on, the most senior military veterinarian was placed in the Hellenic Army General Staff and exempt from all other duties.

=== Independent operation ===
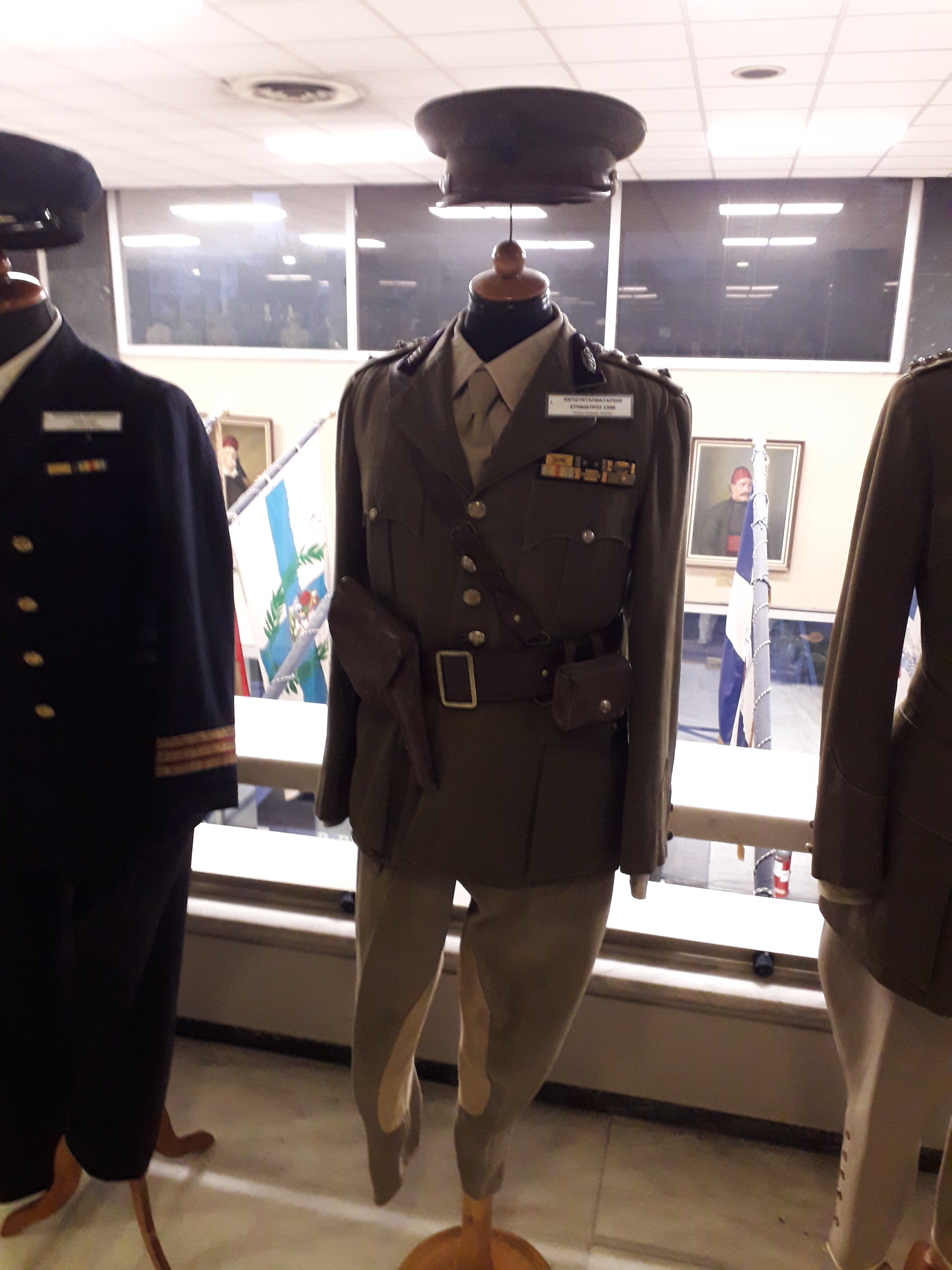
HAVS lieutenant colonel's uniform dating to 1940

The efforts of Pilavios and other veterinarians led to the establishment of the Hellenic Army Veterinary Service in 1904 and the first veterinary hospital (Athens Garrison Veterinary Hospital). In 1911, Pilavios was succeeded as head of the Veterinary Service by Charilaos Kanavatzoglou. In 1912, the law number 3995/1912 set the number of veterinarians serving in the Greek military at 32 and established a second veterinary hospital in Larissa. It also abolished the position of divisional veterinarian, dispatching military veterinarians to cavalry and artillery regiments; which hampered its operation during the Balkan Wars. The Veterinary Service trained approximately 20 farriers per year, a number insufficient for the needs of the army. Basic veterinary training was provided to cadets in the Hellenic Military Academy and the Higher Military School for Non-Commissioned Officers which was supplemented by the publication of veterinary manuals.

During the course of the Balkan Wars the number of serving veterinarians rose to 50. This included conscripts, volunteers from the Greek diaspora and French veterinarian Lamarck. Farriers numbered 35 corporals and 70 privates. The Veterinary Hospital of Thessaloniki was founded in 1914. The organized training of veterinary nurses was initiated in 1917. The following year was marked by the creation of veterinary equipment warehouses, up until then veterinary supplies were stored along with other medical material. Farrier workshops were attached to the veterinary warehouses, creating regular, orthopedic and corrective horseshoes.

During the course of the Greco-Turkish War (1919–1922), the Greek military faced considerable logistical issues. The use of pack animals expanded at such a pace that it became impossible to provide them with adequate fodder and medical care, especially . Veterinary equipment warehouses were founded in Smyrna, Mudanya and Uşak. Due to shortages in manpower, the Greek army also employed Ottoman veterinarians and French military veterinarians. By 1923 the Veterinary Service had become completely independent. Each veterinary hospital had an outpatient, infectious disease, surgical and microbiological departments as well as a nursing school.

A. Tsirikos served as the commander of the Veterinary Service between 1936 and 1941. Following the outbreak of the Greco-Italian War on 28 October 1940, the number of conscripted military veterinarians stood at 150. 190 additional veterinarian positions were created during the course of the war, of which 80% were filled. At the time military veterinary hospitals operated in Athens, Thessaloniki, Larissa and Eleftheroupoli. In addition there were three veterinary equipment warehouses in Athens, Thessaloniki and Kavala. Following the Greek defeat in the German invasion of Greece military veterinarians hid veterinary scientific material from the enemy in caches which were successfully retrieved after the end of the Axis occupation of Greece. The HAVS took an active part during the Greek Civil War (1946–1949). A common issue during the war was the lackluster training of muleteers and the use of locally produced pack saddles which were unsuitable for large breeds of equidae imported from USA. This resulted in the frequent occurrence of saddle related injuries among the animals.

The mountainous terrain of the country and the absence of an adequate road network meant that the Veterinary Service continued to train both veterinarians and muleteers into the 1950s. The wide use of frozen food and the gradual modernization of the army led to the mass retraining of Greek military veterinarians abroad starting from 1953. The same year marked the introduction of the first mobile laboratory in HAVS' service. By 1969, most of the unit's personnel had acquired a specialization in one of the fields of veterinary public health. Food safety became the main focus of its operation.

=== Modern day ===
In 1989, the Greek Air Force began using dogs to guard its facilities. The use of dogs by the Greek military later expanded to the fields of detection and therapy. Service dogs were also introduced into the Hellenic Police, Fire Service, Coast Guard and the Ministry of Finance. The reproduction, training and healthcare of service dogs fell under the responsibility of the Veterinary Service. Greek military veterinarians have taken part in the investigation of the effects of depleted uranium use in the Bosnian War and the organization of the 2004 Summer Olympics. They have also contributed to food and water quality control in Greek refugee camps during the 2015 European migrant crisis and the handling of several epizootics.

The Museum of the Military Veterinary Service was opened in 2005, on the grounds of the Larissa Army Veterinary Training and Treatment Center. It incorporates the old stables and farrier workshop, its exhibits include approximately 3,000 historical objects related to the treatment of equidae.
