= Mobile laboratory =

Laboratory housed or transported by a vehicle

A mobile laboratory is a laboratory that is either fully housed within or transported by a vehicle such as a converted bus, RV, or tractor-trailer. Such vehicles can serve a variety of functions, including:

- Science education
- Science research
- Air, water, and soil analysis and monitoring
- Biosafety

== Mobile Teaching Laboratories ==
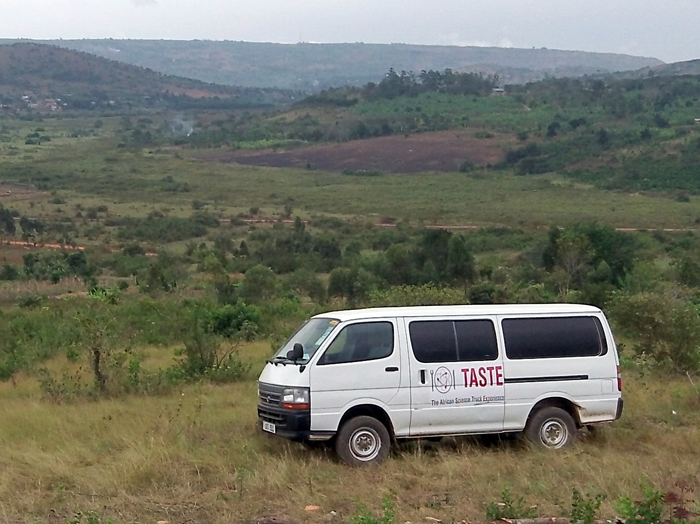
A mobile teaching laboratory in rural Uganda, operated by The African Science Truck Experience. The vehicle contains practical science equipment which is transported between a number of schools.

A novel use of the mobile laboratory is in science education. In some cases, the mobile laboratory travels to schools, museums, and other community organizations, providing the schools with educational resources which they otherwise lack. The mobile laboratory coalition is a loose partnership of groups that provide such services. In other cases, students must also travel to the mobile lab, such as when the lab takes the form of a boat or a train. Mobile laboratories have recently been gaining favor from the National Institutes of Health, in the form of the particular mobile laboratories such as the Biobus located in New York and Georgia State University's Bio-Bus Program located in Atlanta, GA and the Boston University MobileLab, as a way to develop knowledge and understanding regarding biotechnology and medicine amongst the United States population.

The practice of mobile teaching labs exists outside the USA as well with examples, in the UK and in African countries. The UK Institute of Physics is touring secondary schools with their Lab in a Lorry. This is a large articulated truck with three small laboratories. In these, pupils can learn about the use of Physics in Medicine, and do hands-on experiments with light and sound using good physics lab equipment. These are guided by local volunteers and an IoP scientist. Volunteers usually have an interest in general science, or come from a science background. The project has the backing of the British Science Association, the STEMNET Ambassadors Scheme, and sponsors such as EDF Energy.
