= Bio-Bus =

Biomethane-powered vehicle

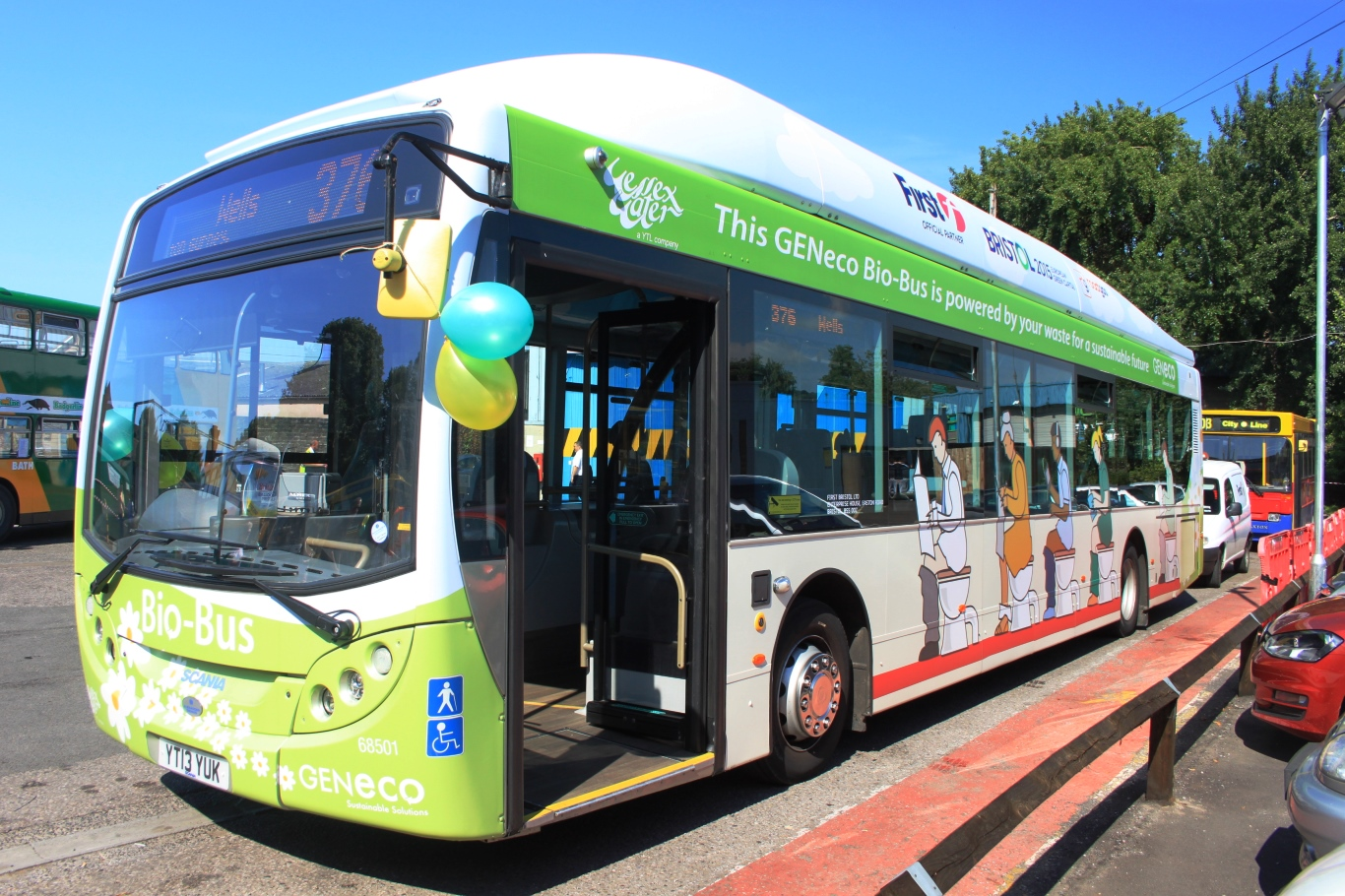

Bio-Bus is the UK's first bus powered entirely by human faeces and food waste.

The bus, which entered service in south west England in 2014, is powered by biomethane. The gas is made from human sewage and food waste which is processed at a plant in Avonmouth run by GENeco, a subsidiary of Wessex Water. It has a Scania K270UB chassis and an Enviro200 body with 40 seats. A special registration was issued: YT13YUK.

The bus initially served a 15 miles (24 km) Bath Bus Company route between Bristol Airport and Bath. The neighbouring city of Bristol was European Green Capital in 2015 and, in connection with this, the bus operated in Bristol on the First Bristol number 2 route. Now it runs for Reading Buses as BU52GAS.

Similar buses have operated in Oslo.

When compared with the diesel engines normally used to power buses, the Bio bus produces 20–30% less carbon dioxide, 80% fewer nitrogen oxides and is low in particulates. One tank of the gas will power the bus for 300 kilometres (190 mi); however, the bus has to refuel at the Bristol Sewage Treatment Works which is seven miles from the city centre, which means that the bus has to make a significant journey to refuel, making it less economic to run.
