= 105th Technical & Administrative Services Group (Reserve) =

105 Technical & Administrative Services Group
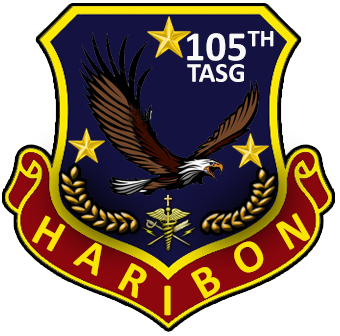
- Unit Seal of the 105th Technical & Administrative Services Group (Reserve)
- Country: Philippines
- Allegiance: Republic of the Philippines
- Branch: Armed Forces of the Philippines
- Type: Technical Services Reserve; Technical Services
- Role: Combat Service Support, SAR, Disaster Relief and Rehabilitation Operations, Civil-Military Operations and Civil-military Co-operations, Spec-Ops
- Size: 2 Technical & Administrative Services (Reserve) Units (FOB), 1 Headquarters & Headquarters Service Company, and 4 Technical & Administrative Services (Reserve) Units Companies
- Part of: Under the 1st Technical & Administrative Services Brigade (Reserve)
- Garrison/HQ: AFPRESCOM Cpd, CGEA, Quezon City
- Nickname(s): "Haribon"
- Mascot(s): Philippine eagle
- Engagements: None
- Decorations: Philippine Republic Presidential Unit Citation Badge

Commanders
- Current commander: LTC GERARDO M JABONALLA PA (RES)
- Command Sergeant Major: MSg Leonardo C Valiente PA (Res)

Insignia
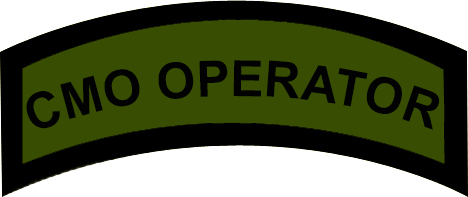
- CMO Operator Tab

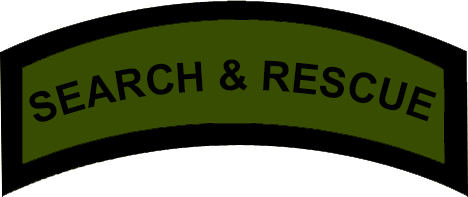
- Search and Rescue Tab

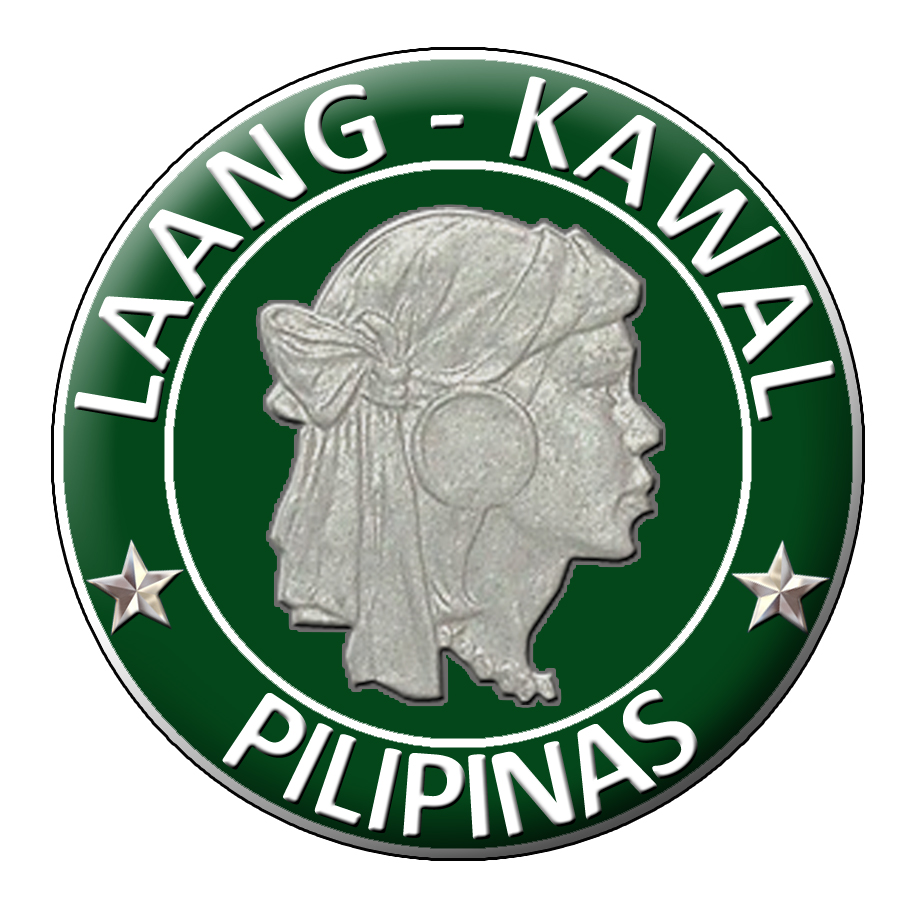
- Laang Kawal Seal

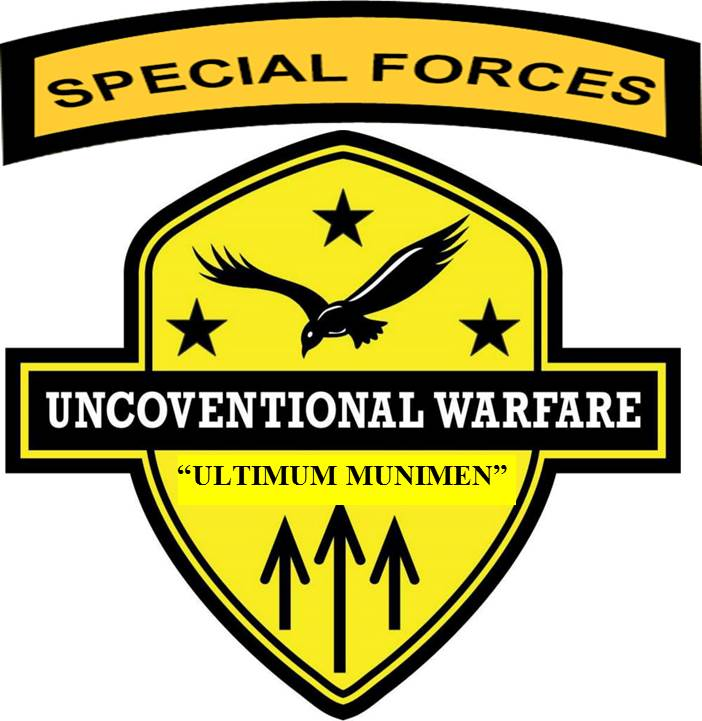
- Special Forces-Unconventional Warfare Operations (SF-UWOC) TAB

The 105th Technical & Administrative Services Group, known officially as Haribon Group, is one of five TAS units of the 1st Technical and Administrative Services Brigade (Reserve) of the AFP Reserve Command, and is based in Quezon City. The unit provides combat service support services to the 1502nd Infantry Brigade (Ready Reserve) and 1503rd Infantry Brigade (Ready Reserve) of the Army Reserve Command.

The AOR of the 105th TAS Group covers the entirety of Quezon City and the City of Marikina. It is primarily tasked to support maneuver units of the AFP Reserve Force operating within these areas.

== The Commissioned Officer Corps ==
Officers of the 105TASG, AFPRESCOM are directly commissioned through AFP Circular Nr. 4 and 6 and may come from any of the following professions:

- Lawyers and Paralegal Specialists (Judge Advocate General Service)
- Medical Doctors (Medical Corps)
- Nurses (Nurse Corps)
- Dentists (Dental Service)
- Veterinarians (Veterinary Corps)
- Licensed Teachers (Corps of Professors)
- Allied Medical, Business, and Mass Communication Specialists (Medical Administrative Corps)
- Licensed Engineers (Corps of Engineers)
- Ordained Chaplains (Chaplain Service)

== Organization ==
The following are the units that are presently placed under operational control of the 105th Technical & Administrative Services Group (Reserve).

=== Base Units ===
- Headquarters & Headquarters Service Support Company

=== Line Units ===
- "A" TAS Company
- "B" TAS Company
- "C" TAS Company
- "D" TAS Company

=== Forward Operating Base Units ===
- 1051st (QUEZON) Technical & Administrative Services Unit (Ready Reserve)
- 1052nd (MARIKINA) Technical & Administrative Services Unit (Ready Reserve)

== Operations ==
- Disaster SAR, Relief and Rehabilitation Operations (TF Glenda) (16 Jul 14 - 17 Jul 14)
- Tree Planting CMO Operations (GHQ-AFP) (02 Aug 14 - 6 Sep 14)
- Medical and Dental CMO Operations - Bgy Tatalon, Quezon City (13 Sep 14)
- Tree Planting CMO Operations (San Miguel Corporation Compound) (13 Sep 14)
- Disaster SAR, Relief and Rehabilitation Operations (TF Mario) (19 Sep 14 - 21 Sep 14)
- Tree Planting CMO Operations (Bgy UP Village, Quezon City) (21 Sep 14)
- Security Augmentation Operations (Maginhawa Food Festival) (11 Oct 14)
- Security Augmentation Operations (75th QC Anniversary Float Parade) (12 Oct 14)
- Clean-up CMO Operations (Bgy Tumana, Marikina) (18 Oct 14)
- Medical & Dental Civic Action Program (MEDCAP) (Bgy Kamuning, Quezon City) (08 Feb 15)
- AFP JTF-NCR Contingent 2nd Rescue March Challenge (Manila) (26 Apr 15)
- Brigada Eskwela (ENCAP) (Culiat HS, Quezon City) (18 May 15)
- Medical & Dental Civic Action Program (MEDCAP) (Bgy Olandes, Marikina) (25 Jul 15)
- Medical & Dental Civic Action Program (MEDCAP) (Caloocan HS, Caloocan) (2 Aug 15)
- Medical & Dental Civic Action Program (MEDCAP) (Bgy Nagkaisang Nayon, Quezon City) (5 Sep 15)
- Medical & Dental Civic Action Program (MEDCAP) (Bgy Tatalon, Quezon City) (12 Sep 15)
- AFP-JCI Disaster Responders Challenge (GHQ-AFP) (2 - 3 Dec 16)
- Medical & Dental Civic Action Program (MEDCAP) (Bgy San Mateo, Norzagaray, Bulacan) (30 Dec 16)

== Awards and decorations ==
=== Campaign streamers ===
Award streamer	Streamer name	Operation	Date awarded	Reference
	Presidential Unit Citation Badge	SAR/DRR Ops, TS Ketsana	4 February 2010	General Orders No. 112, GHQ-AFP, dtd 4 Feb '10
	Presidential Unit Citation Badge	General Elections, Philippines	1 July 2010	General Orders No. 641, GHQ-AFP, dtd 1 July '10
	Presidential Unit Citation Badge	TS Haiyan/Bohol Earthquake/Zamboanga Siege	13 January 2014	General Orders No. 51, GHQ-AFP, dtd 13 January '14

=== Badges ===
Military Badge	Badge Name	Operation	Date Awarded	Reference
	AFP Election Duty Badge	General Elections, Philippines	21 May 2010	General Orders No. 513, GHQ-AFP, dtd 21 May '10
	AFP Election Duty Badge	General Elections, Philippines	16 July 2017	General Orders No. 828, GHQ-AFP, dtd 16 Jul '17

== Gallery ==
Miscellaneous Gallery

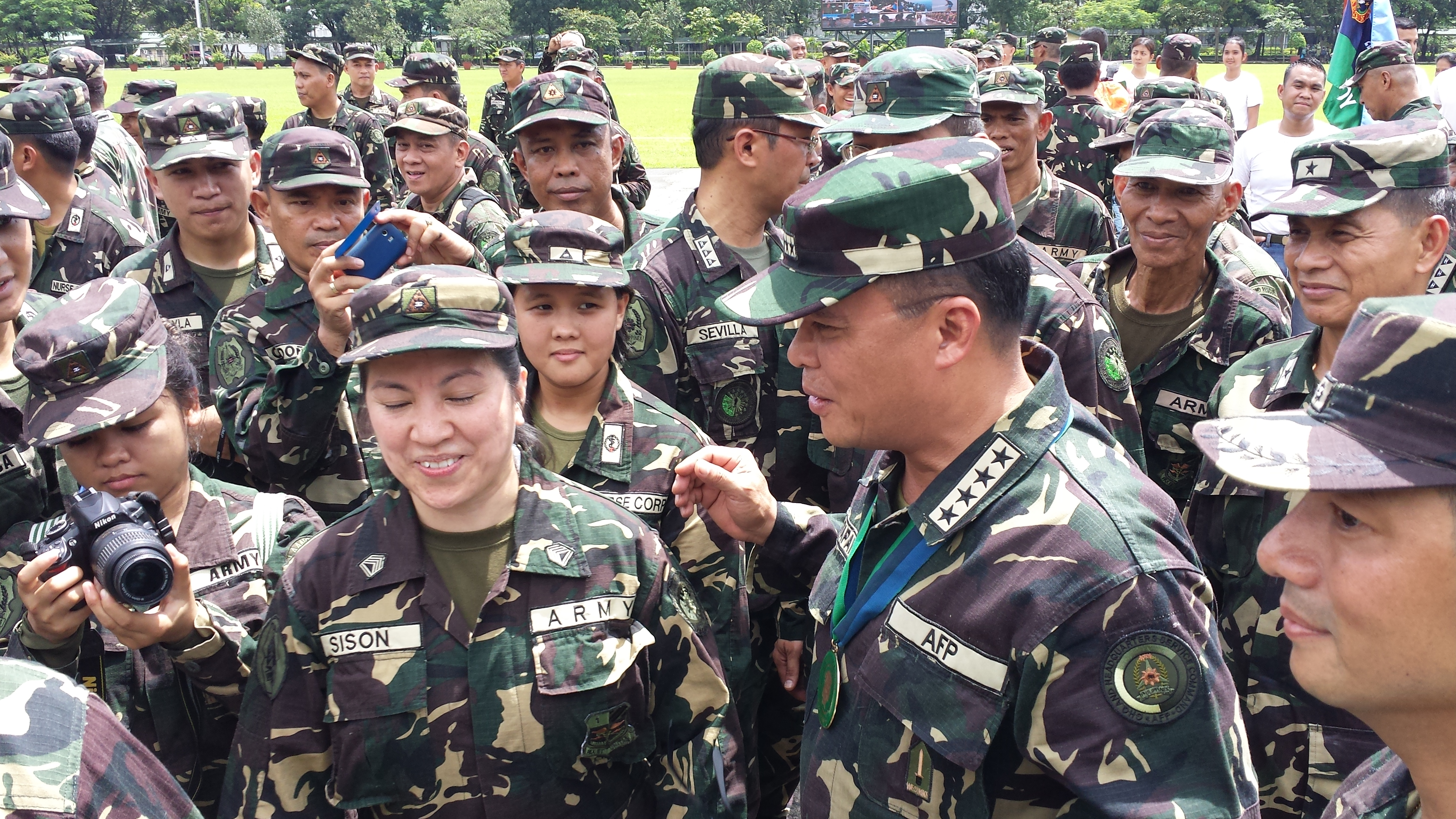
AFP Chief of Staff - Gen Gregorio Pio P Catapang AFP enjoys a light moment with the troops of the 105th TASG at the end of their Tree Planting CMO Operations.

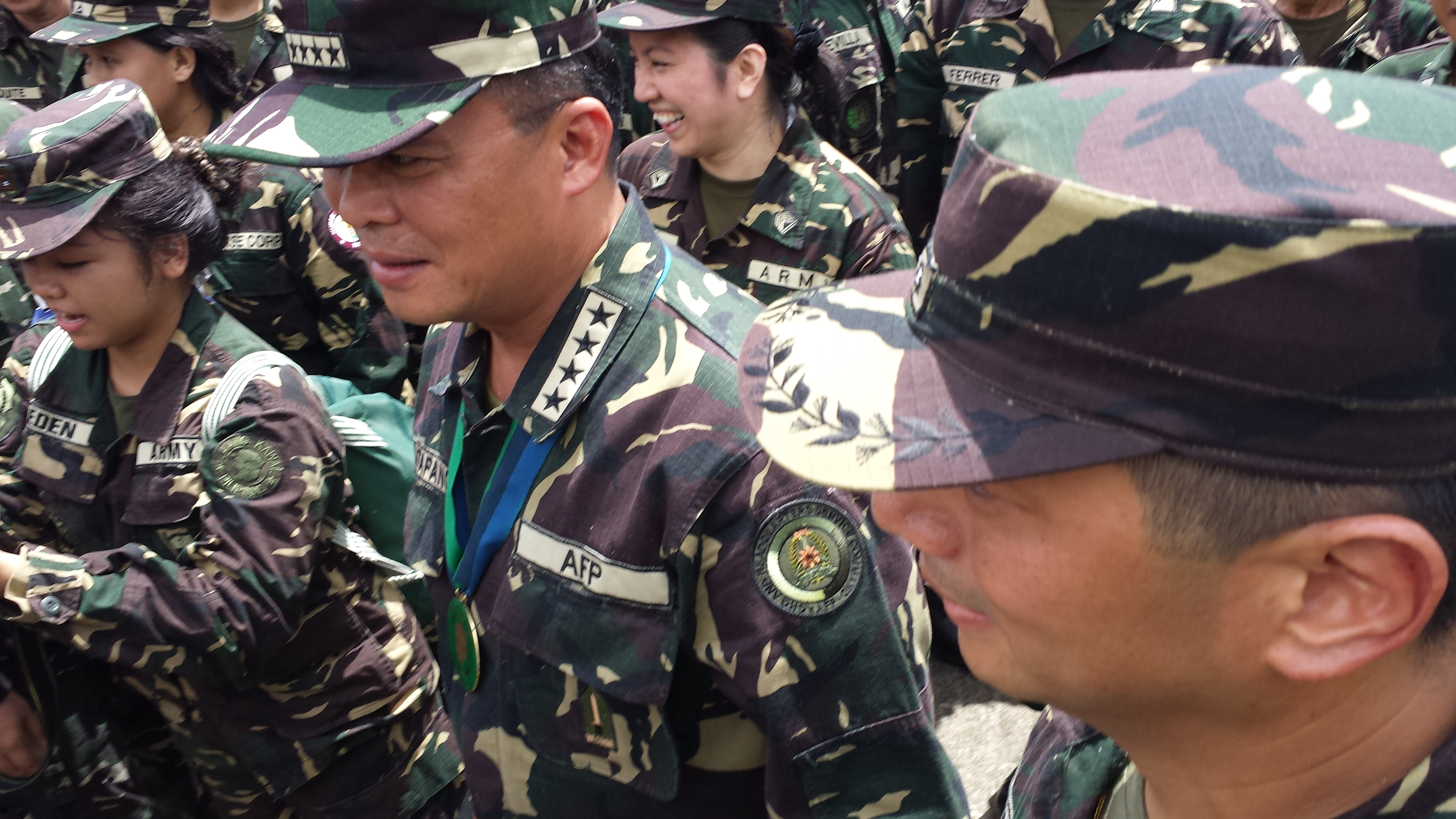
AFP Chief of Staff - Gen Gregorio Pio P Catapang AFP is led by LTC Peter C Suchianco (GSC) JAGS to the designated area for tree planting during the 35th NRW.

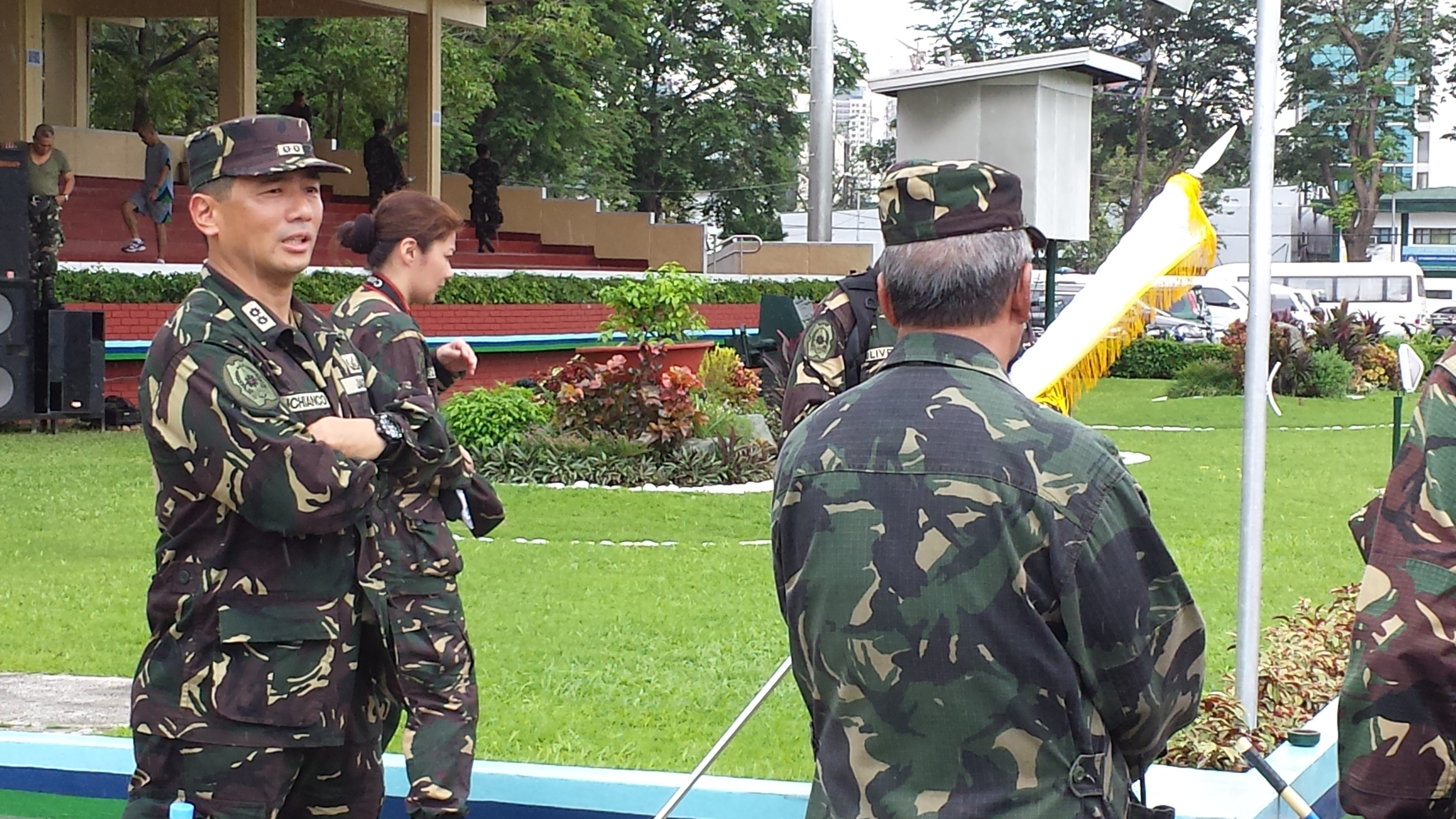
105th TASG Commander - LTC Peter C Suchianco RES (GSC) JAGS leaves instructions for the troops prior to termination of the activities.

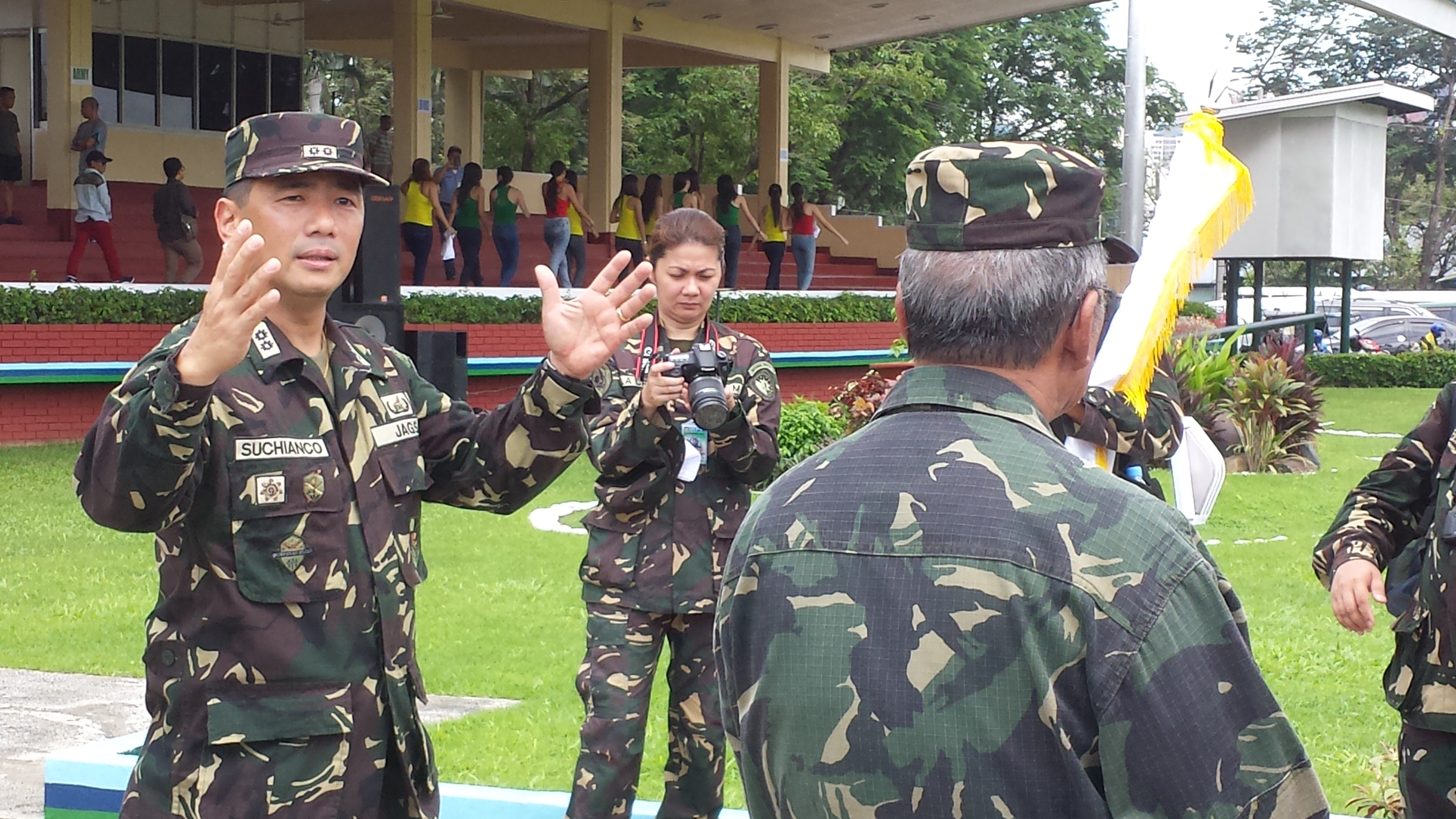
105th TASG Commander - LTC Peter C Suchianco RES (GSC) JAGS leaves instructions for the troops prior to termination of the activities.

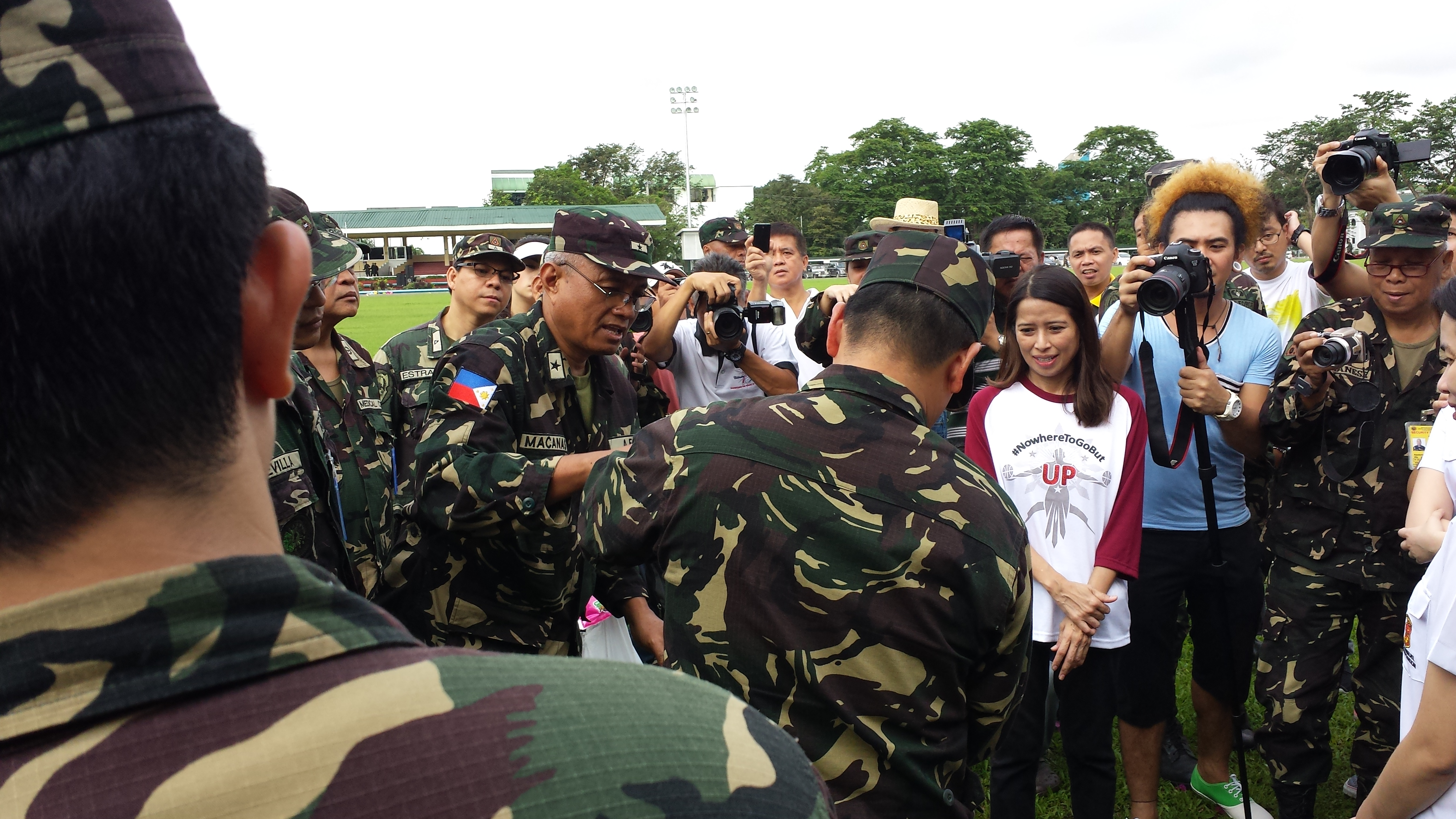
BGen Johnny Macanas AFP, AFP Deputy J-9, plants the first saplings together with members of the 105th TASG Command Section and representatives from the San Miguel Corporation.

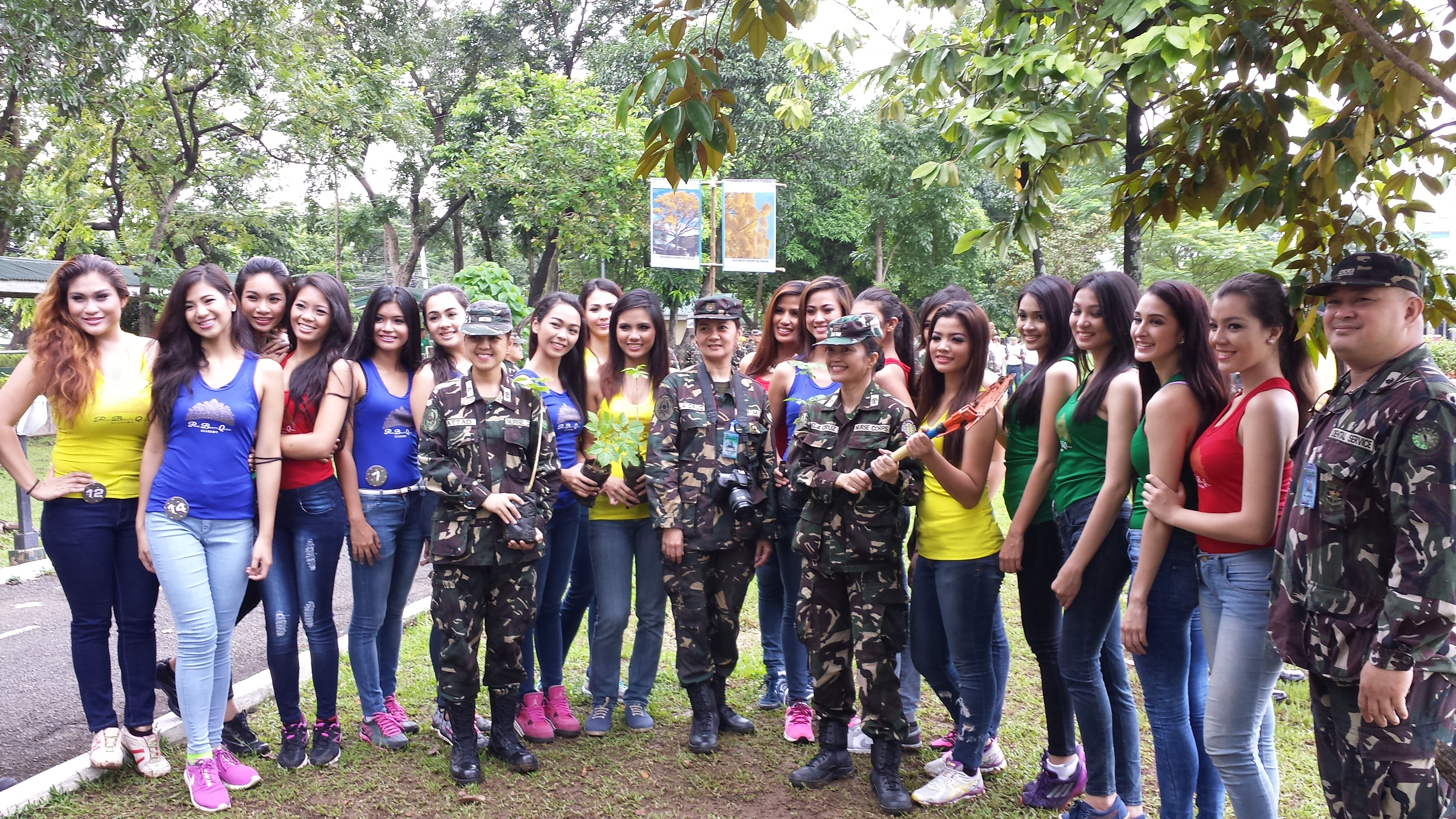
GMA 7's Pinay Beauty Queen Academy Candidates pose with Officers of the 105th TASG during the conduct of Tree Planting CMO Operations at GHQ-AFP last Sept 6, 2014.

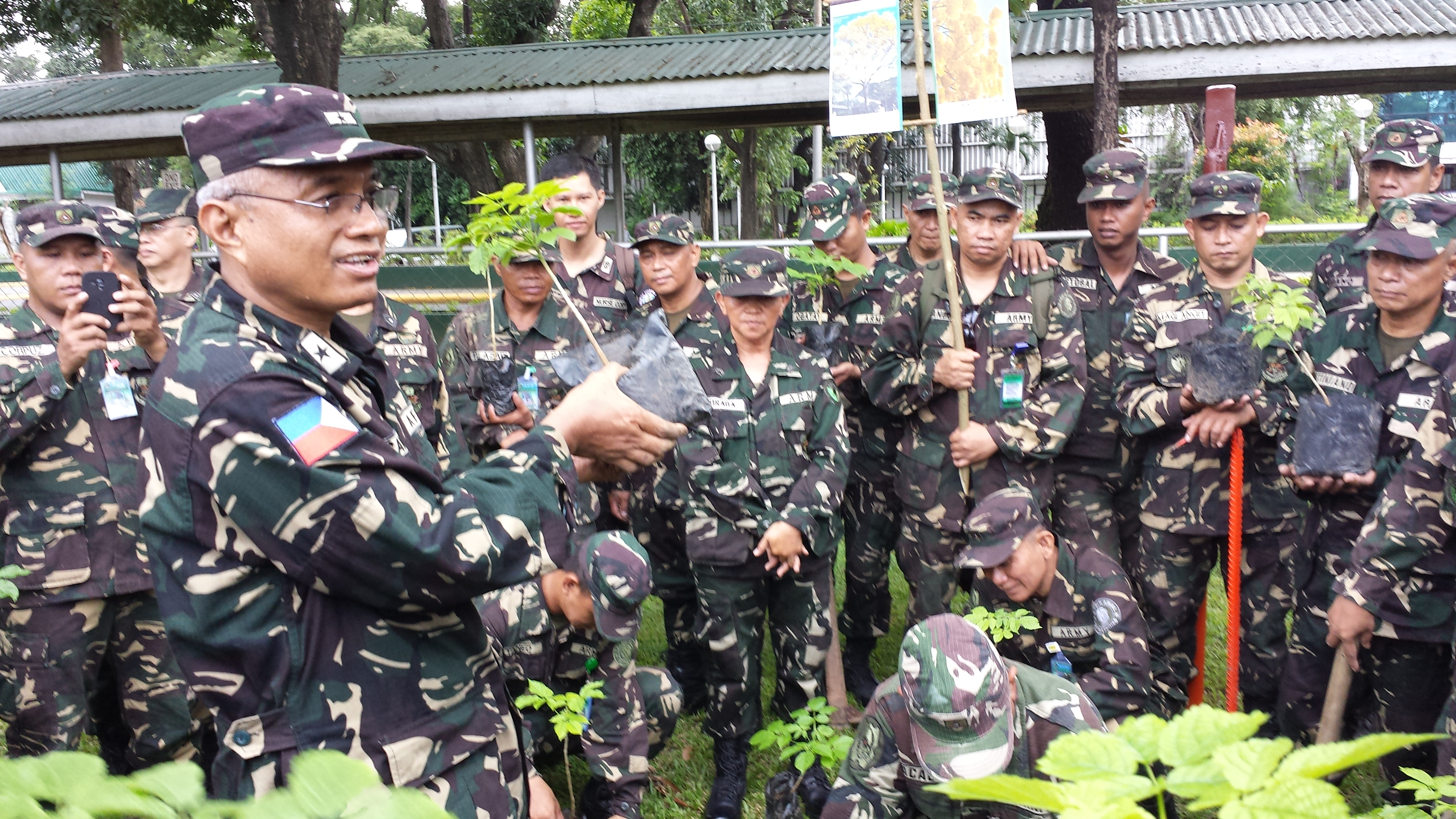
BGen Johnny Macanas AFP, AFP Deputy J-9, demonstrates to members of the 105th TASG the proper way of planting and growing trees.

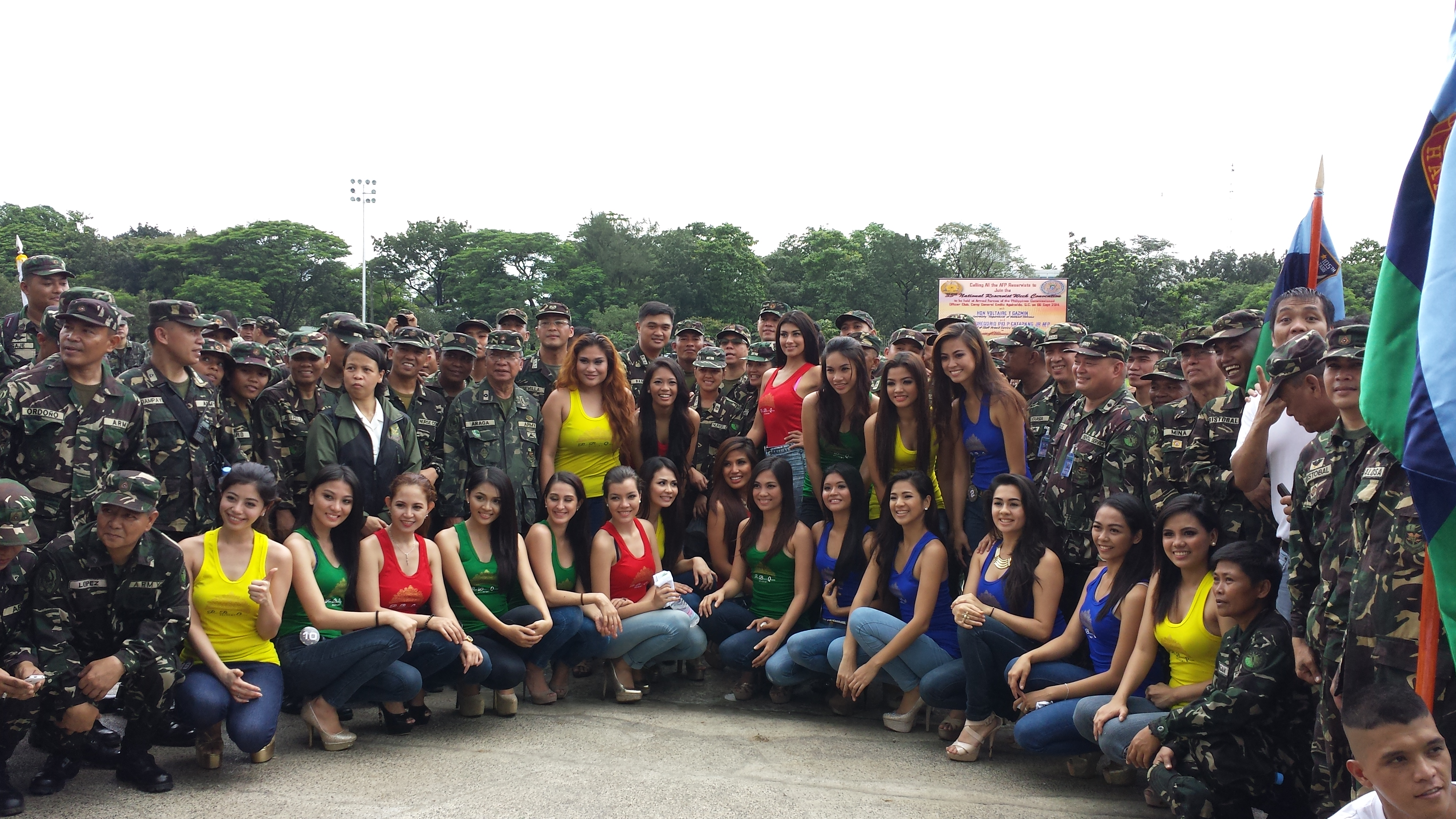
Officers and Enlisted Personnel of the 105th TASG shares a photo-op with the candidates of the Pinay Beauty Queen Academy during the 35th NRW at Camp Aguinaldo.

== See also ==
- AFP Reserve Command
- 1051st Technical & Administrative Services Unit (Ready Reserve)
- 1502nd Infantry Brigade (Ready Reserve)
- 201st Infantry Battalion (Ready Reserve)
- 202nd Infantry Battalion (Ready Reserve)
