= BioBus =

Concept in science education

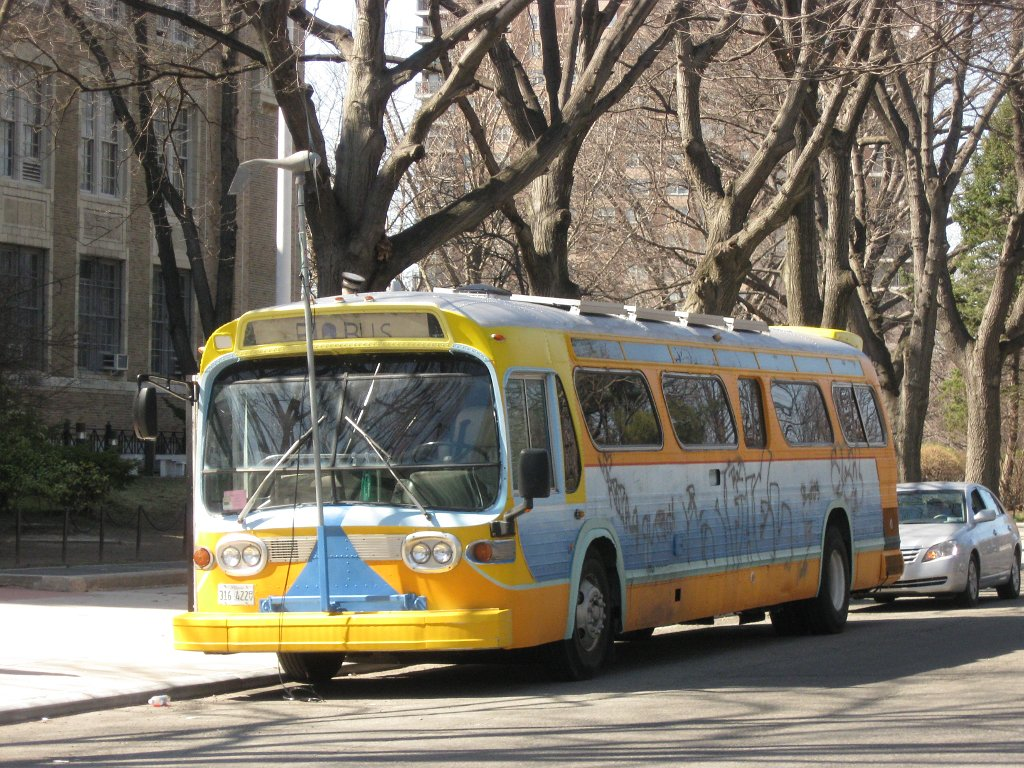
The New York BioBus, an ex-Golden Gate Transit coach, outside DeWitt Clinton High School, March 2009.

Biobus is a novel concept in science education involving a bus that has been equipped as a self-contained, mobile laboratory used to educate K-12 students in biology basics. The bus may also be used for other audiences such as community organizations. Typically, a school or organization requests a visit, and the bus, staffed by scientists, arrives onsite so that it can involve students in participatory science experiments and presentations. The objective is to demonstrate to young people the fun of actual science, as opposed to textbook learning.

The first Biobus program was created in 1999 by Georgia State University (GSU), with grant assistance from the National Science Foundation. Since its founding, the GSU Biobus has made 1,000 visits involving over 286,000 people. The concept has spread beyond Georgia, including New York City.
