= List of military veterinary services =

This is a list of Military Veterinary Services from around the world. Some are still active while others were disbanded, mostly around the decline of horses in military service.

In general, Military Veterinary Services provide care for service animals, public health services (food inspection, water quality), development assistance and research services. However each service varies significantly from others based on national mandates and interests.

Country	Service name	Crest, badge or logo	Years active
United States	United States Army Veterinary Corps		3 June 1916 to present
United Kingdom	Royal Army Veterinary Corps (RAVC)		1796 to present
Greece	Hellenic Army Veterinary Service (HAVS)		1832 to present
Canada	Royal Canadian Army Veterinary Corps (RCAVC)		1910 to 1940
Australia	Australian Army Veterinary Corps (AAVC)		1909–1946
New Zealand	New Zealand Veterinary Corps (NZVC)		1907– 9 January 1947
Spain	Spanish Armed Forces Military Veterinary Center (CEMILVET)		1904 to present
Russia	Veterinary-Sanitary department		current
India	Remount Veterinary Corps (RVC)		1794 to present
Sweden	Various Military Veterinary Staff Officers; Swedish Army Veterinary Corps		current 1887–1969
Norway	Norwegian Veterinary Corps		1791 to present
France	Service de santé des armées – Vétérinaires des armées		1769 to present
Germany	German Veterinary Service (Zentraler Sanitätsdienst der Bundeswehr – Veterinärmedizin)		current
Nazi Germany	Waffen SS-Veterinary service		World War II
South Africa	South Africa Veterinary Corps		1913–unknown; incorporated into SAMC
Morocco			current
Finland			current
Austria			current
Slovenia			current
Croatia			current
Denmark			current
Belgium			current
The Netherlands			current
Poland			current
Italy			current
Thailand	Royal Thai Army Veterinary & Remount Department		current
Switzerland	Centre of competence for Veterinary Service and Army Animals		current
Pakistan	Remount, Veterinary, and Farming Corps (RV&FC)		current
Estonia			current
Slovakia			current
Brazil	Brazilian Army Veterinary Service	Brazilian Army Veterinary Medicine Symbol	4 January 1908-current
South Korea	ROK veterinary corps		current
Japan	Japanese Imperial Army Veterinary Service		
Uganda	Uganda People's Defense Force – a single veterinarian		current
Bangladesh	Remounts Veterinary & Farm Corps – (RV&FC)		current
Czech Republic	Military Medical Agency		current
Hungary	Chief of Defence, Medical Directorate		current
People's Republic of China	People's Liberation Army		current
Turkey	Turkish Veterinary Corps		current
Mexico			current
Soviet Union	Veterinary Service		Cold War
Austria-Hungary	Veterinary Service		World War One
Argentina	Remount and Veterinary Command (Comando de Remonta y Veterinaria)		current
Portugal			current
Ecuador	Veterinary Service		
Romania	Veterinary Service		1831 – ?
Colombia	Veterinary Service		current
Japan	Imperial Japanese Army Veterinary School		1893–1945
