= Military nurse =

Type of profession

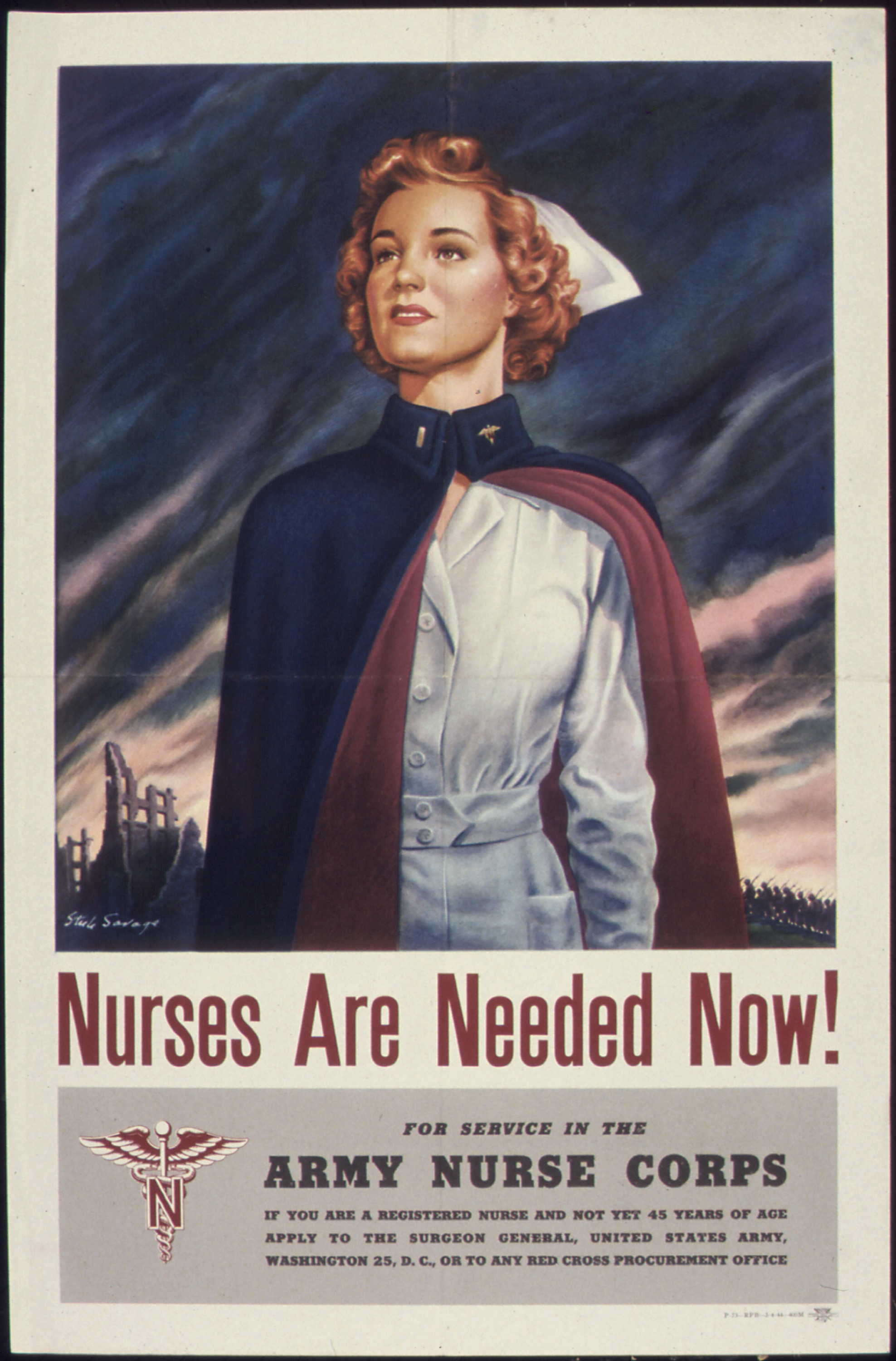
Recruitment poster, World War II

Most professional militaries employ specialised military nurses or nursing sisters. They are often organised as a distinct nursing corps. Florence Nightingale formed the first nucleus of a recognised Nursing Service for the British Army during the Crimean War in 1854. In the same theatre of the same war, Professor Nikolai Ivanovich Pirogov and the Grand Duchess Yelena Pavlovna originated Russian traditions of recruiting and training military nurses – associated especially with besieged Sevastopol (1854–1855). Following the war Nightingale fought to institute the employment of women nurses in British military hospitals, and by 1860 she had succeeded in establishing an Army Training School for military nurses at the Royal Victoria Military Hospital in Netley, Hampshire, England.

In 1898, after the Spanish-American War, the United States added 1,500 nurses to their military personnel (Brooks, 2018). A year later in 1899, the Surgeon General recognized the importance of these nurses and established a "reserve group" of nurses with specific criteria to prepare for future wars. Military nurses are similar to floor nurses in that they spend most of their time providing direct patient care. Patient assessments, medication distribution, interventions and documentation are part of their daily work. These nurses are needed at all military bases, active war zones, clinics and front lines – not always on United States territory.

== Well-known nursing corps ==
- U.S. Army Nurse Corps, a special branch of the Army Medical Department (United States)
- Queen Alexandra's Royal Army Nursing Corps, a specialist corps of the Army Medical Services of the British Army
- Royal Australian Army Nursing Corps
- U.S. Navy Nurse Corps, a staff corps of the United States Navy
- U.S. Air Force Nurse Corps
- Military Nursing Service (India)

== Educational Requirements ==
According to Nguh (2020), for nursing officers to serve in the military it normally requires a bachelor's degree in nursing. For example, a branch known as the Air National Guard, allows an individual to join as enlisted and work as an Aeromedical Evacuation Technician while finishing their BSN degree. The military branch will pay for the individuals BSN and after graduation the nurse can earn a salary as a 2nd Lieutenant contingent upon successfully passing their nursing boards.

== Challenges to working as a military nurse ==
Nurses can often experience challenges when delivering care to patients when they do not have the appropriate supplies, medicines, and equipment that is normally available in American hospitals A study was conducted in Camp Bastion Hospital in Afghanistan, where 18 British Armed Forces nurses were interviewed. These nurses serves in Afghanistan between 2001 and 2014 and it was found that nurses often experienced many psychological stressors such as lacking family support, suffering from mental health issues, experiencing separation anxiety, missing their families and friends, feeling unprepared and not able to take care of seriously injured patients, and nurses found it emotionally difficult taking care of terminally ill patients.
