= Medical corps =

Military service branch responsible for health and medical care for military personnel

A medical corps is an explicitly non-combatant a military branch or officer corps responsible for medical care for serving military personnel. Such officers are typically unarmed military physicians.

== List of medical corps ==
The following organizations are examples of medical corps:

In the British Armed Forces and Commonwealth of Nations:

- Royal Army Medical Corps, a specialist corps of the Army Medical Services that provides medical care to British Army personnel
- Royal Australian Army Medical Corps, the branch of the Australian Army responsible for providing medical care to Army personnel
- Royal Canadian Medical Service, the unified branch of all non-dental medical personnel, providing care for all Navy, Army and Air Force personnel.
- Royal New Zealand Army Medical Corps, a corps of the New Zealand Army that is responsible for medical care to Army personnel
- Sri Lanka Army Medical Corps, a corps of the Sri Lanka Army that is responsible for medical care to Army personnel

In the United States military:

- United States Army Medical Corps, a corps that consists of all physicians of the U.S. Army Medical Department
- United States Navy Medical Corps, a staff corps of the United States Navy consisting of doctors in a variety of specialties
- United States Air Force Medical Service, a corps that consists of all physicians of the U.S. Air Force Medical Service

In the Pakistan Army:

- Pakistan Army Medical Corps

In the Indian Armed Forces

- Armed Forces Medical Services (AFMS), known as Army Medical Corps that is responsible for medical care to Indian Armed Forces (Army, Navy, Air Force, Coast Guard) personnel. It is tri-service organization. It provides medical support to the Armed Forces during war as well as comprehensive health care to all service personnel, ex-servicemen and their dependents during peace. Army Medical Corps provides medical aid during natural calamities both at national and international levels. AFMS has a common pool which allows officers to migrate from one service to another depending on the requirement.

In the French Armed Forces:

- Defence Health Service

In the Irish Defence Forces:

- Medical Corps

In the Israel Defense Forces:

- Medical Corps

In the Myanmar Armed Forces:

- Myanmar Army Medical Corps

In the Bangladesh Armed Forces:

- Army Medical Corps

In the Polish Armed Forces:

- Military Health Service, part of the Polish Armed Forces providing a comprehensive full-scale military health service to them

In the Singapore Armed Forces:

- SAF Medical Corps, a tri-service organization part of the Singapore Armed Forces that provides medical support for the Singapore Army, Navy and Air Force.

In the South African National Defence Force:

- South African Military Health Service, a distinct Arm of Service (as opposed to Army, Navy or Air Force), providing a comprehensive full-scale military health service to the South African National Defence Force

In the Armed Forces of the Russian Federation:

- Main Military Medical Directorate

In the German Armed Forces (Bundeswehr):

- Zentraler Sanitätsdienst

== Dental corps ==
A dental corps is a specialist military unit, generally including dentists and dedicated to maintaining the dental health of service personnel. Dental corps are therefore a kind of medical corps, and are typically either within the medical corps of their military organization, or closely associated with it.

=== List of dental corps ===
- Royal Army Dental Corps, a specialist corps of the British Army Medical Services
- Royal Australian Army Dental Corps
- Royal Canadian Dental Corps
- Royal New Zealand Dental Corps
- United States Army Dental Corps, a special branch of the Army Medical Department
- United States Navy Dental Corps
- Army Dental Corps (India)
- Army Dental Corps (Pakistan)
- Army Dental Corps (Bangladesh)

== See also ==
- Medical Reserve Corps, a civilian program in the United States
- International Medical Corps (IMC), a global humanitarian nonprofit organization
- Medical Cadet Corps, a Seventh-day Adventist organization
- SS Medical Corps, of the SS in the Nazi Germany
