= Philippine Army Reserve Command =

Reserve Command, Philippine Army
- Pangasiwaan ng Panlaáng Kawal, Hukbóng Katihan ng Pilipinas
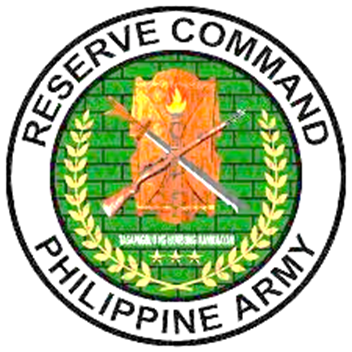
- Unit seal of the Reserve Command, Philippine Army
- Active: September 1, 1977 – February 26, 1986 (as Regional Community Defense Units); May 12, 1992 – present (current iteration)
- Country: Philippines
- Type: Army reserve force
- Role: Conventional and Unconventional Warfare; Anti-Guerrilla Operations; Combat Support & Service Support; Force Multiplier; Training; Disaster Rescue & Relief; Community Service
- Size: 790,000+ (both Ready Reserve, and Standby Reserve)
- Part of: Philippine Army
- Garrison/HQ: Camp General Mariano Riego de Dios, Tanza, Cavite
- Nicknames: ARESCOM; RESCOM, PA
- Mottos: Tagapagbuo ng Hukbong Mamamayan (Citizen Army Builder)
- Anniversaries: May 12
- Decorations: Philippine Republic Presidential Unit Citation Badge

Commanders
- Commander-in-Chief: President Ferdinand Romualdez Marcos, Jr.
- Secretary of National Defense: Gilberto C. Teodoro, Jr.
- Chief of Staff of the Armed Forces of the Philippines: GEN Antonio G. Nafarrete, PA
- Commanding General of the Philippine Army: LTGEN Donald M. Gumiran, PA
- Commander: MGEN Ronald Jess S. Alcudia, PA

Insignia
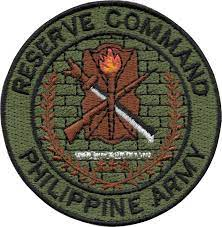
- Unit Shoulder Sleeve Insignia

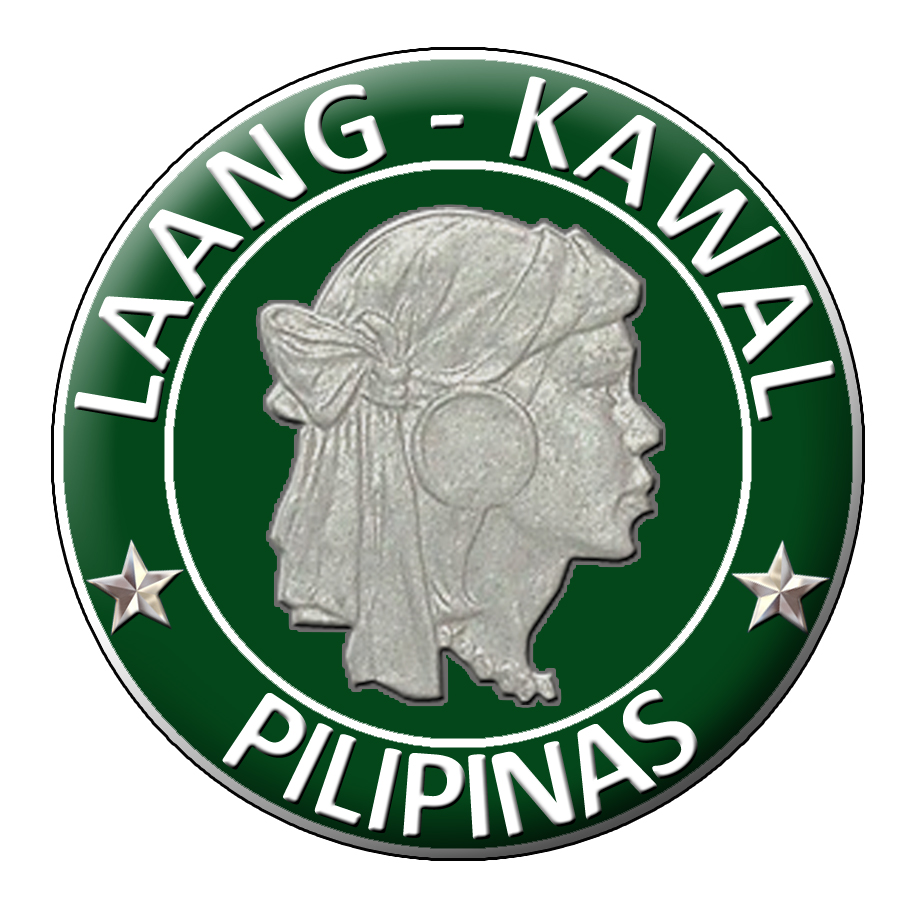
- AFP Reserve Force Shoulder Sleeve Insignia

The Reserve Command (RESCOM, PA; Filipino: Pangasiwaan ng Panlaáng Kawal) is one of the Philippine Army's functional commands created for the sole purpose of reserve force management, organization and Government Arsenal procurement.

== History ==
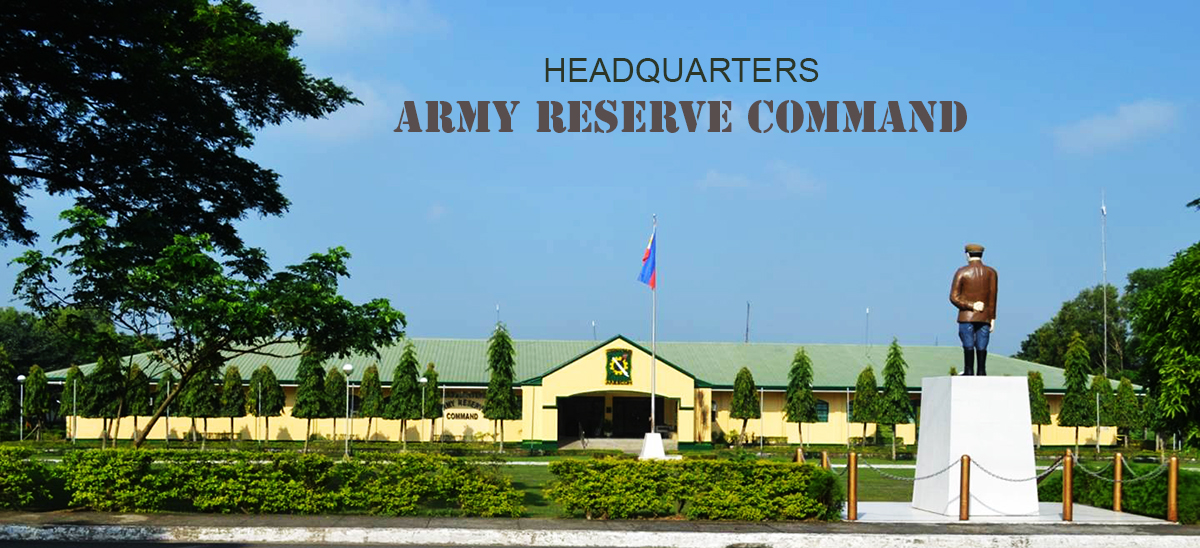
Facade of the Headquarters Building of the Reserve Command, Philippine Army at Tanza, Cavite.

=== Philippine Commonwealth ===
By 1935, the Philippine Commonwealth, under the leadership of President Manuel Luis Quezon enacted the very first legislature of his government. Commonwealth Act Nr. 01 ensured that Philippines will be prepared to thwart off any invasion or aggression of some sort by any nation, or entity and thus called upon its citizens to provide manpower to then fledgling Philippine Army. The National Defense Act of 1935 heralded the creation of what would be the Armed Forces of the Philippines and very first documented account of voluntary citizen enlistment.

=== World War II ===
Reservists fought hard during the 1940s and saw action on almost all parts of the country in World War II. Regular and reserve members of then Philippine Army/Philippine Army Air Corps (forerunner of the Phil Air Force), the Philippine Constabulary, and the Philippine Offshore Patrol (what would become the Phil Navy later on.) were incorporated with US units and rallied under the banner of the USAFFE.

A ragtag group of former ROTC Cadets, Guerilla Fighters and draftees of the Philippine Army Reserve Force formed units among themselves and fought gallantly against the Japanese invaders. Collectively, they were known as the Hunters ROTC Unit.

=== Post World War II ===
Post WWII saw the re-organization of the AFP and the further need to rebuild the defense of the nation. Reserve units were then organized to Battalion Combat Teams with the sole purpose of force augmentation in the eventuality that another world war ensues.

On September 1, 1977, the Army Reserve Command was activated pursuant to General Orders No. 250 of the Philippine Army, after consolidating various Regional Community Defense Units (RCDUs). Army officers were tasked to organized, train, and manage a reserve force that will equate or surpass the current strength of its regular forces.

=== 1986 EDSA Revolution ===
By 1986, after the EDSA Revolution, the unit was shortly deactivated since the AFP at that time was undergoing retraining and re-organization.

=== Birth of the modern AFP Reserve Force ===
1991 saw the birth of a new reserve force when Republic Act 7077 (Reservists Act of 1991) was signed into law on July 1, 1991. This new legislation directed the AFP to organize and create units with the sole purpose of reservists management.

On May 12, 1992, the Reserve Command, Philippine Army, was again reactivated pursuant to HPA General Orders No. 392 and was later again renamed as the Army Reserve Command on October 1, 1999 (HPA GO Nr 1300) and was given its marching orders to maintain, administer, develop, train, and organize reservists units to help enhance and sustain National Security and Development.

=== Future of RESCOM, PA ===
In the 21st century, the unit is modernizing itself pursuant to the directives of Headquarters, Philippine Army's transformation roadmap to 2028.

== Legal Mandate ==
=== Commonwealth Act 1 ===
Commonwealth Act No. 1, particularly Section II, cites the responsibility of each and every citizen of for the defense of the nation. Citizens may be mobilized in the event the national government declares an act of war or emergency.

=== Republic Act 7077 ===
Republic Act No. 7077, also known as the Citizen's Armed Force Act or Reservist Law of 1991, is an act passed in to law by the joint house of representatives which clearly provides the policies and procedures in the creation and administration of reservists and reserve units of the Armed Forces of the Philippines.

=== Republic Act 9163 ===
Republic Act No. 9163, also known as the National Service Training Program Act or National Service Law of 2001, defines the policies and procedures in administration/training of ROTC Units in relation to the other two components, Civic Welfare Training Service (CWTS) and Literacy Training Service (LTS), of the National Service Training Program (NSTP).

== Training ==
Training is the major task handled by RESCOM. Its primary arms are the university/college-based Department of Military Science and Tactics-administered mandatory basic and the optional advanced Reserve Officer Training Corps (ROTC); and the territorial unit-administered Basic Citizen's Military Training (BCMT).

=== Reserve Officer's Training Corps (ROTC) ===
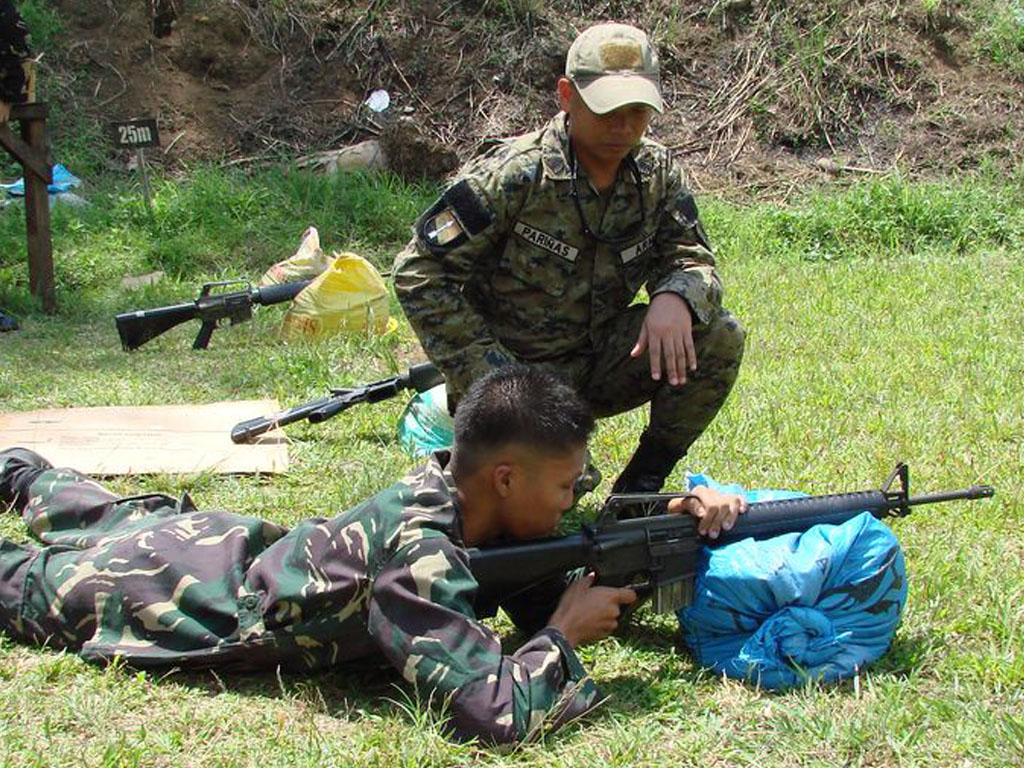
A soldier of the Special Operations Command of the Philippine Army instructs an ROTC cadet officer on the finer points of the M16 rifle

Basic ROTC is the only component required by a tertiary (college) level student to have completed as requirement for completion of the National Service Training Program. Military subjects are provided similar to how military instructions are conducted in the service academies and graduates are automatically enlisted in the reserve force of the particular service branch (Army) administering the training. Advance ROTC is purely voluntary in nature and that Advance ROTC Cadets are provided a modest allowance after passing the requirements for their respective Advance ROTC Examination (PAARE). Completion of Advance ROTC is considered a graduate qualification in Military Science, and such graduates who subsequently progress to the Probationary Officer Training Course (POTC) are commissioned as 2nd Lieutenants.

Other than time-in-grade and merit promotions, rank adjustments are authorised depending on civilian qualifications, as well as their reciprocity to the operating environment.

=== Basic Citizen's Military Training (BCMT) ===
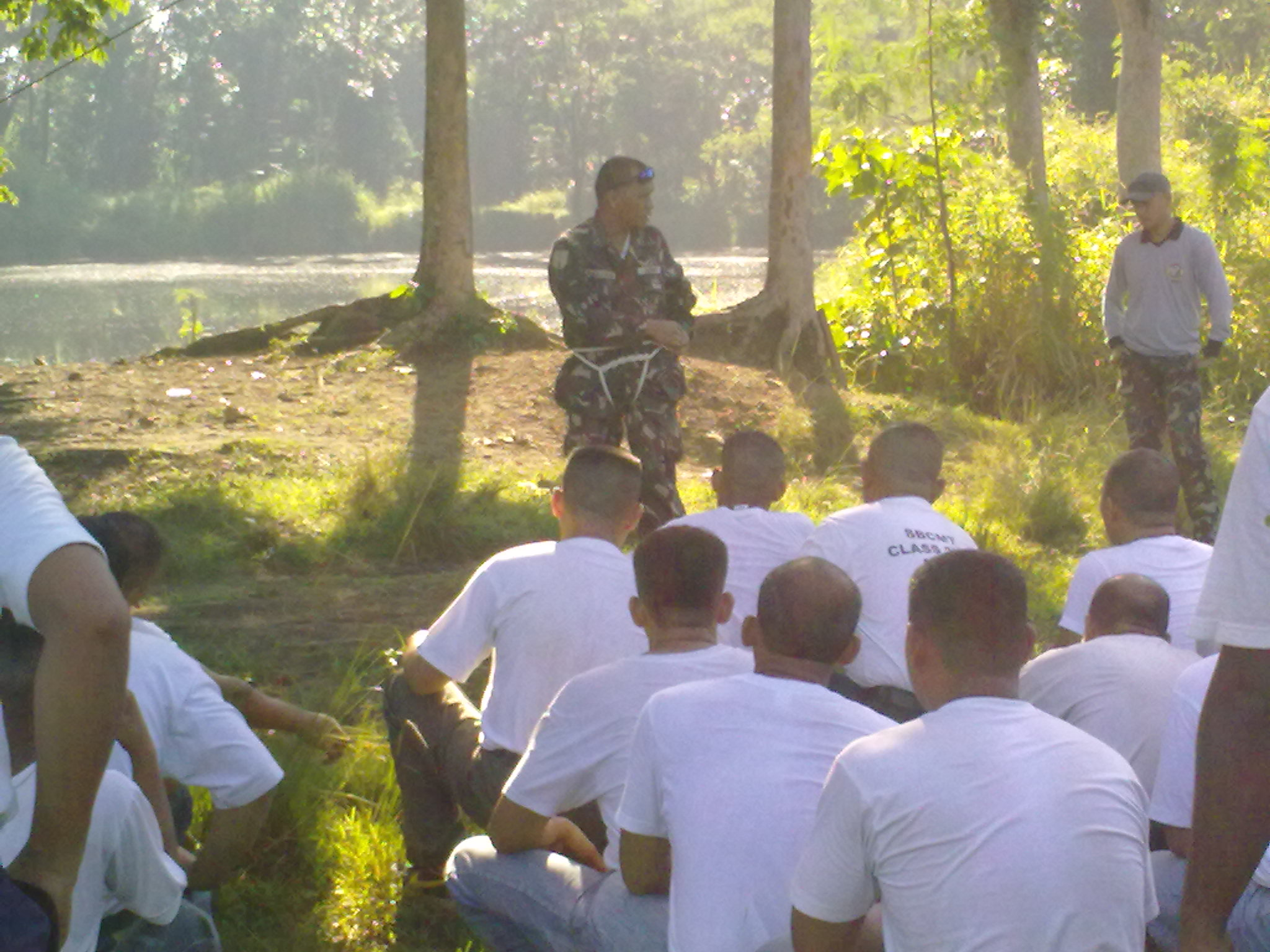
A Sergeant from the Scout Ranger Regiment gives instructions on military rappelling to SBCMT CL45-11 of the 1302nd Community Defense Center.

Basic Citizen's Military Training (BCMT) is a military training course conducted by the Philippine Army through RESCOM, PA. It is an entry-level training course undertaken by Filipino citizens wanting to enlist in the reserve force.

BCMT instruction is administered by a joint training pool of military instructors from both regular and reserve forces and is usually conducted inside any of the Philippine Army's training camps. Guest instructors are requested from other government agencies and non-government organizations (NGO) for specialized instructions.

Special Basic Citizen's Military Training (SBCMT) is a special course conducted by the Philippine Army in response to a request from a Local Government Unit (LGU). Funding is usually provided for by the requesting agency as compared to regular BCMT which receives funding from the Army.

=== Military Orientation Training (MOT) ===
This is specialized training provided by the AFP, through RESCOM, PA for volunteer employees of private or public organizations of utility service providers assigned as a Philippine Army Affiliated Reserve Unit (PAARU).

== Types of Army Reservists ==
There are currently three types of reservists in the Armed Forces of the Philippines (AFP) Reserve Force:

=== Categorization of Reservists and Reserve Units ===
Section 12, Article 5, of Republic Act 7077 breaks down and categorizes reservists and their units based on various criteria cited by this law.

- First Category Reservists - Able bodied Reservists aged 18 up to 35 years of age, inclusive.
- Second Category Reservists - Able bodied Reservists aged 36 up to 51 years of age, inclusive.
- Third Category Reservists - All able-bodied Reservists aged above 52 years of age.

=== Classification of Reservists and Reserve Units ===
Section 13, Article 5, of Republic Act 7077 clearly cites the classification of reservists based on their operational readiness for immediate deployment or mobilization.

- Ready Reserve - physically fit and tactically current reservist personnel that are always on constant alert and training; ready to mobilize once a mobilization order has been given. Reservists who belong to/work for a PAARU is also classified under the Ready Reserve.
- Standby Reserve - Reservists who do not maintain currency in specialization qualifications but the base for expansion, support and augmentation to the Ready Reserve Force as needed.
- Retired Reserve - composed of citizens who are qualified for retirement either by length of service or age.

== Lineage of commanding officers ==
Commanders of RESCOM, PA are drawn from both the ranks of Called To Active Duty (CAD) Reserve Officers and Regular Army Officers that graduated from either Officer Candidate School (OCS) and the Philippine Military Academy (PMA).

Tenure begin	Tenure end	Rank	Name
1 Sep 1977	1986	COL	Anthony Zamora, GSC, PA
1 Jul 1992	1 Jul 1995	COL	Ernesto H Luis, GSC, PA
1 Jul 1995	10 Dec 1997	BGEN	Franklin C Acosta, AFP
10 Dec 1997	30 Nov 2000	BGEN	Antonio J Saldua, AFP
30 Nov 2000	16 Jan 2002	COL	Edmund G Pacada, GSC, PA
16 Jan 2002	25 Apr 2002	COL	Bernard Basona, GSC, PA
25 Apr 2002	9 Dec 2002	BGEN	Marcial A Collao Jr, AFP
9 Dec 2002	16 Oct 2003	BGEN	Jeffer Francia, AFP
16 Oct 2003	1 Jul 2004	BGEN	Dionisio A Torina, AFP
1 Jul 2004	24 Aug 2005	COL	Ibarra P Gutierrez, INF, GSC, PA
24 Aug 2005	18 Dec 2006	BGEN	Emmanuel S Cayton, AFP
18 Dec 2006	26 May 2008	BGEN	Luini C Mirar, AFP
26 May 2008	7 Mar 2010	BGEN	Danilo M Garcia, AFP
7 Mar 2010	10 Mar 2011	BGEN	Joel P Ibañez, AFP
10 Mar 2011	19 Oct 2013	BGEN	Alex N Albano, AFP
19 Oct 2013	13 Nov 2014	BGEN	Alexis D Tamondong, AFP
13 Nov 2014	2 Feb 2016	BGEN	Paolo Leo Ma G. Miciano, AFP
2 Feb 2016	16 Sep 2016	BGEN	Pascual Luis D Bedia, AFP
16 Sep 2016	26 Mar 2020	MGEN	Bernie S Langub, PA
26 Mar 2020	10 Jul 2021	MGEN	Peale Jon L Bondoc, PA
10 Jul 2021	5 Nov 2022	MGEN	Fernando V Felipe, PA
5 Nov 2022	27 Feb 2023	COL	Samuel B Manzano, PA (acting)
27 Feb 2023	20 Jan 2025	MGEN	Romulo A Manuel, PA
20 Jan 2025	4 Feb 2025	BGEN	Samuel B Manzano, PA (acting)
4 Feb 2025	3 Nov 2025	MGEN	Ramon P Zagala, PA
3 Nov 2025	present	MGEN	Ronald Jess S Alcudia, PA

== Organization ==
RESCOM's unit are divided into several base units, regionally into 15 Community Defense Groups, having three or more Community Defense Centers incorporated into them, and nine Reserve Infantry Divisions. Army ROTC Management falls under their respective RCDGs.

=== Base units ===
- Headquarters & Headquarters Service Battalion
- ARESCOM Training School
- ARESCOM Reservist Personnel Management Center (Provisional)

=== Line units ===
- 1st Regional Community Defense Group (Camp Lt Tito B Abat, Manaoag, Pangasinan)
- 2nd Regional Community Defense Group (Camp Melchor F Dela Cruz Annex, Soyung, Echague, Isabela)
- 3rd Regional Community Defense Group (Camp Gen Servillano S Aquino, San Miguel, Tarlac City)
- 4th Regional Community Defense Group (Camp Gen Macario Sakay, Los Baños, Laguna)
- 5th Regional Community Defense Group (Camp Gen Simeón A Ola, Legazpi City, Albay)
- 6th Regional Community Defense Group (Camp Gen Adriano Hernández, Dingle, Iloilo City)
- 7th Regional Community Defense Group (Camp Lapu-lapu, Cebu City)
- 8th Regional Community Defense Group (Camp Downes, Ormoc, Leyte)
- 9th Regional Community Defense Group (Kuta Dao, Pagadian City, Zamboanga del Sur)
- 10th Regional Community Defense Group (Camp Edilberto Evangelista, Patag, Cagayan de Oro City)
- 11th Regional Community Defense Group (Camp San Gabriel, Mintal Tugbok District, Davao City)
- 12th Regional Community Defense Group (Camp Siongco, Awang, Datu Odin Sinsuat, Maguindanao del Norte)
- National Capital Region Regional Community Defense Group (Fort Andres Bonifacio, Taguig City)
- 14th [CAR] Regional Community Defense Group (Brgy. Mabatobato, Lamut, Ifugao)
- 15th [CARAGA] Regional Community Defense Group (Camp Romualdo Rubi, Butuan)

=== Ready Reserve Infantry divisions ===
- 2nd Infantry Division (Ready Reserve), PA (Lupi, Camarines Sur)
- 4th Infantry Division (Ready Reserve), PA (Cp Camp Natividad, Malaybalay City, Bukidnon)
- 5th Infantry Division (Ready Reserve), PA (Cp Elpidio Quirino, Bulag, Bantay, Ilocos Sur
- 6th Infantry Division (Ready Reserve), PA (Cp BG Gonzalo H Siongco, Tacurong, Maguindanao del Norte)
- 8th Infantry Division (Ready Reserve), PA (Cp Vicente Lukban, Catbalogan, Western Samar)
- 10th Infantry Division (Ready Reserve), PA (Cp Bancasi, Libertad, Butuan, Agusan del Norte)
- 12th Infantry Division (Ready Reserve), PA (Cp Juan Villamor, Bangued, Abra)
- 15th Infantry Division (Ready Reserve), PA (Fort Andrés Bonifacio, Metro Manila)
- 16th Infantry Division (Ready Reserve), PA (Cp Tito Abat, Manaoag, Pangasinan)
- 17th Infantry Division (Ready Reserve), PA (Cp Eldridge, Los Baños, Laguna)
- 18th Infantry Division (Ready Reserve), PA (Cp Jizmondo, Libas, Banga, Aklan)
- 19th Infantry Division (Ready Reserve), PA (Cp Lapu-lapu, Cebu City)
- 22nd Infantry Division (Ready Reserve), PA (Quimpo Boulevard, Almendras Gym Davao City)

=== Ready Reserve Light Armor divisions ===
- Light Armor (Ready Reserve) Division, PA (Cp Riego De Dios, Tanza, Cavite)

=== Standby Reserve Infantry divisions ===
- 11th Infantry (Standby Reserve) Division, PA (Cp Tito Abat, Manaoag, Pangasinan)
- 21st Infantry (Standby Reserve) Division, PA (Cp Melchor Dela Cruz, Upi, Gamu, Isabela)
- 31st Infantry (Standby Reserve) Division, PA (Cp Servillano Aquino, Luisita, Tarlac)
- 41st Infantry (Standby Reserve) Division, PA (Cp Eldridge, Los Baños, Laguna)
- 51st Infantry (Standby Reserve) Division, PA (Cp Simeon Ola, Legazpi City, Albay)
- 61st Infantry (Standby Reserve) Division, PA (Cp Hernandez, Dingle, Iloilo)
- 71st Infantry (Standby Reserve) Division, PA (Cp Lapu-lapu, Lahug, Cebu City)
- 81st Infantry (Standby Reserve) Division, PA (Cp Downes, Ormoc City)
- 91st Infantry (Standby Reserve) Division, PA (Cp Dau, Pagadian City)
- 101st Infantry (Standby Reserve) Division, PA (Cp Evangelista, Cagayan de Oro City)
- 111th Infantry (Standby Reserve) Division, PA (Cp San Gabriel, Davao City)
- 121st Infantry (Standby Reserve) Division, PA (PC Hill, Cotabato City)
- 131st Infantry (Standby Reserve) Division, PA (Fort Andrés Bonifacio, Taguig City)
- 151st Infantry (Standby Reserve) Division, PA (CARAGA Region)

=== Reserve regiments ===
- Artillery (Ready Reserve) Regiment, PA (Fort Andrés Bonifacio, Metro Manila)

=== Deactivated units ===
The Following Divisions were subsequently de-activated due to the activation of the two Regular Infantry Division with the latter's divisional numerical designation.

- 9th Infantry (Ready Reserve) Division, PA (Makati)
- 3rd Infantry (Ready Reserve) Division, PA (Cebu City)

=== Reserve Brigade ===
- 1502nd Infantry (Ready Reserve) Brigade, PA (Quezon City)

=== Department of Military Science and Tactics (DMST) Groups (Army ROTC Units) ===
- University of the Philippines Diliman - 1302 CDC, NCRRCDG - the first, and the oldest ROTC unit still existing in the country
- Bestlink College of the Philippines - 1302 CDC, NCRRCDG
- University of the East Caloocan - 1301 CDC, NCRRCDG
- Polytechnic University of the Philippines - 1304 CDC, NCRRCDG
- Isabela State University - 202 CDC, 2RCDG
- National College of Science and Technology, Dasmariñas, Cavite - 402 CDC, 4RCDG
- University of Perpetual Help System DALTA - Molino Campus - 402 CDC, 4RCDG
- Cavite State University - Silang Campus - 402 CDC, 4RCDG
- Olinsterg College, Tiaong, Quezon - 404 CDC, 4RCDG
- University of Rizal System - 408 CDC, 4RCDG
- Camarines Norte State College - 501 CDC, 5RCDG
- Iloilo Science and Technology University - Miagao Campus - 604 CDC, 6RCDG
- Salazar Colleges of Science and Institute of Technology - 701 CDC, 7RCDG
- Eastern Samar State University - Guiuan - 802 CDC, 8RCDG
- University of Mindanao - 1105 CDC, 11RCDG
- University of Southeastern Philippines - 1105 CDC, 11RCDG
- University of the Philippines Baguio - 1401 CDC, 14(CAR)RCDG

=== Philippine Army Affiliated Reserve Units (PAARUs) ===
- 2nd Metro Davao Signal Battalion (Reserve) (SMNI)
- General Santos City Water District (GSCWD) PAARU
- Polomolok Water District PAARU
- Linaheim Properties, Inc. PAARU

== Prominent Filipino Army Reservists ==
=== Commissioned officers ===
- BGEN Herbert Constantine M Bautista, MNSA, PA(Res) - actor; former Mayor of Quezon City
- COL Sara Z Duterte-Carpio, GSC, PA(Res) - current Vice President of the Philippines
- COL Margarita R Cojuangco, MNSA, PA(Res) - former Governor, Tarlac; former president, Philippine Public Safety College
- COL Emmanuel D Pacquiao Sr., GSC, PA(Res) - boxer, former Senator; the only eight-division world boxing champion in history
- LTC Rosalinda D Baldoz, MNSA, PA(Res) - former Secretary, Department of Labor and Employment
- LTC Gwendolyn F Garcia, PA(Res) - former Governor, Cebu
- LTC Richard Frank I Gomez, PA(Res) - actor, TV host; Representative, 4th District, Leyte
- LTC Antonio Ernesto F Lagdameo, Jr., PA(Res) - Special Assistant to the President, Marcos Jr. Administration; former Representative, 2nd District, Davao del Norte
- LTC Lucy Marie M Torres-Gomez, PA(Res) - actress; Mayor, Ormoc City, Leyte
- LTC Robinhood Ferdinand C Padilla, PA(Res) - actor, current Senator; incumbent president, Partido Demokratiko Pilipino
- LTC Marlene Ruth S Sanchez, MNSA, PA(Res) - Deputy Executive Director; NCCA
- 1LT Ronnie DG Liang, Ph.D., MNSA, PA(Res) - singer, actor
- 2LT Gianmatteo Vittorio F Guidicelli, MNSA, PA(Res) - actor; received specialized training from the Scout Rangers, and the Presidential Security Command
- 2LT Zahra Bianca Saldua, PA(Res) - winner, Miss Earth Philippines Air 2018

=== Non-commissioned officers/Enlisted Personnel ===
- MSG Jennivev S Tamayo, PA(Res) - former actress, former Corps Commander of UE ROTC Unit Class of 2002.
- MSG Maria Lourdes Carlos-Fernando, PA(Res) - former Mayor, Marikina
- MSG Maria Regina Corazon Weigh Donaleigh Sevilla-Sibal, PA(Res) - first female Corps Commander of UP ROTC Unit Class of 2000.
- SGT Fernando Cyril V Avanzado, PA(Res) - singer
- SGT Abigail P Maraño, PA(Res) - volleyball player, Nxled Chameleons; former captain, Philippine women's national volleyball team
- PFC Charly C Suarez, PA(Res) - Asian Games silver medalist (lightweight), 2014 Asian Games
- PVT Aeign Zackrey V Aguas, PA(Res) - actor; former Councilor, Cavite City
- PVT Gerald Randolph O Anderson Jr., PA(Res) - actor, director; also a commissioned Auxiliary Captain in the Philippine Coast Guard Auxiliary
- PVT Yves Romeo C Flores, PA(Res) - actor
- PVT Elmo Moses A Magalona, PA(Res) - actor; son of King of Filipino Rap Francis Magalona
- PVT Richelle Ann M Loyola-Avanzado, PA(Res) - singer, actress
- PVT Joseph Jerome G Porciuncula, PA(Res) - actor
- PVT Princess Tinkerbell Cristina Marjorie P Snell, PA(Res) - actress

== Ranks of Army personnel ==
=== Officers ===
Army rank (pay grade) Abbreviation	General Office Attire (GOA) shoulder rank insignia	Philippine Army Pattern (Philarpat) Uniform chest insignia
General (O-10) GEN		
Lieutenant General (O-9) LTGEN		
Major General (O-8) MGEN		
Brigadier General (O-7) BGEN		
Colonel (O-6) COL		
Lieutenant Colonel (O-5) LTC		
Major (O-4) MAJ		
Captain (O-3) CPT		
First Lieutenant (O-2) 1LT		
Second Lieutenant (O-1) 2LT		

=== Enlisted Personnel, and Non-Commissioned Officers ===
Air Force rank (pay grade) Abbreviation	General Office Attire (GOA) sleeve rank insignia	Philippine Army Pattern (Philarpat) Uniform chest insignia
Chief Master Sergeant (E-9) CMSGT		
Senior Master Sergeant (E-8) SMSG		
Master Sergeant (E-7) MSG		
Technical Sergeant (E-6) TSG		
Staff Sergeant (E-5) SSG		
Sergeant (E-4) SGT		
Corporal (E-3) CPL		
Private First Class Class (E-2) PFC		
Private (E-1) PVT		

== Awards and decorations ==
=== Campaign streamers ===
Award Streamer	Streamer Name	Operation	Date Awarded	Reference
	Presidential Unit Citation Badge	SAR/DRR Ops, TS Ketsana & TS Parma	February 4, 2010	General Orders No. 112, GHQ-AFP, dtd Feb 4 '10
	Presidential Unit Citation Badge	General Elections, Philippines	July 1, 2010	General Orders No. 641, GHQ-AFP, dtd July 1 '10

=== Badges ===
Military Badge	Badge Name	Operation	Date Awarded	Reference
	AFP Election Duty Badge	General Elections, Philippines	May 21, 2010	General Orders No. 513, GHQ-AFP, dtd May 21 '10

== Gallery ==
The Army Reserve Command

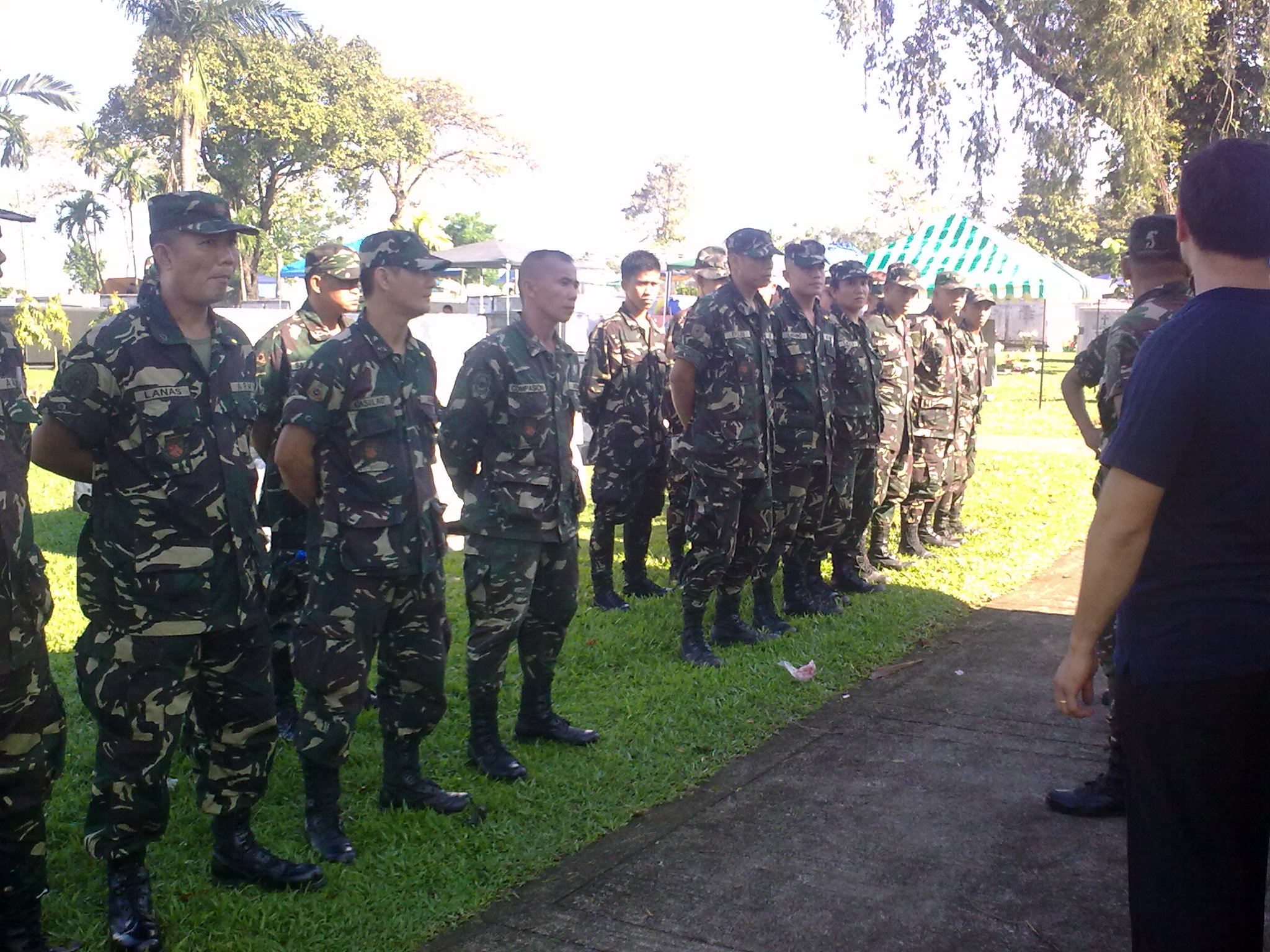
TSg Virgilio S Ferrer II (Res) PA; 20IB(RR) Sergeant Major, briefs the personnel assigned for deployment during Security Operations at Holy Cross Memorial Park, Quezon City (Undas 2009).

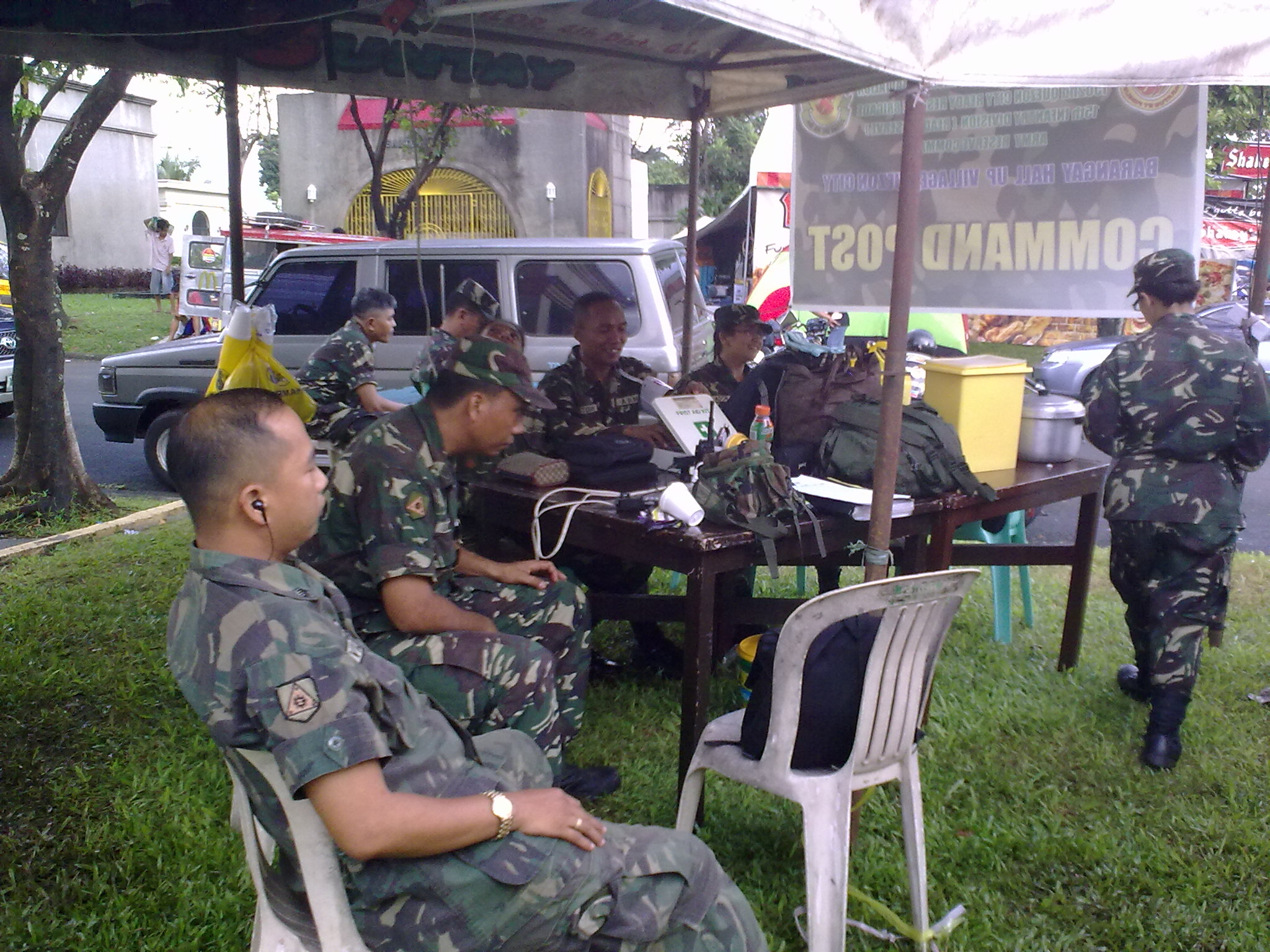
Reservists from the HHC, 1502IBDE(RR) and 20IB(RR) staff the Tactical Command Post at the Holy Cross Memorial Park in San Bartolome, Novaliches, Quezon City during (Undas 2010) Security Operations.

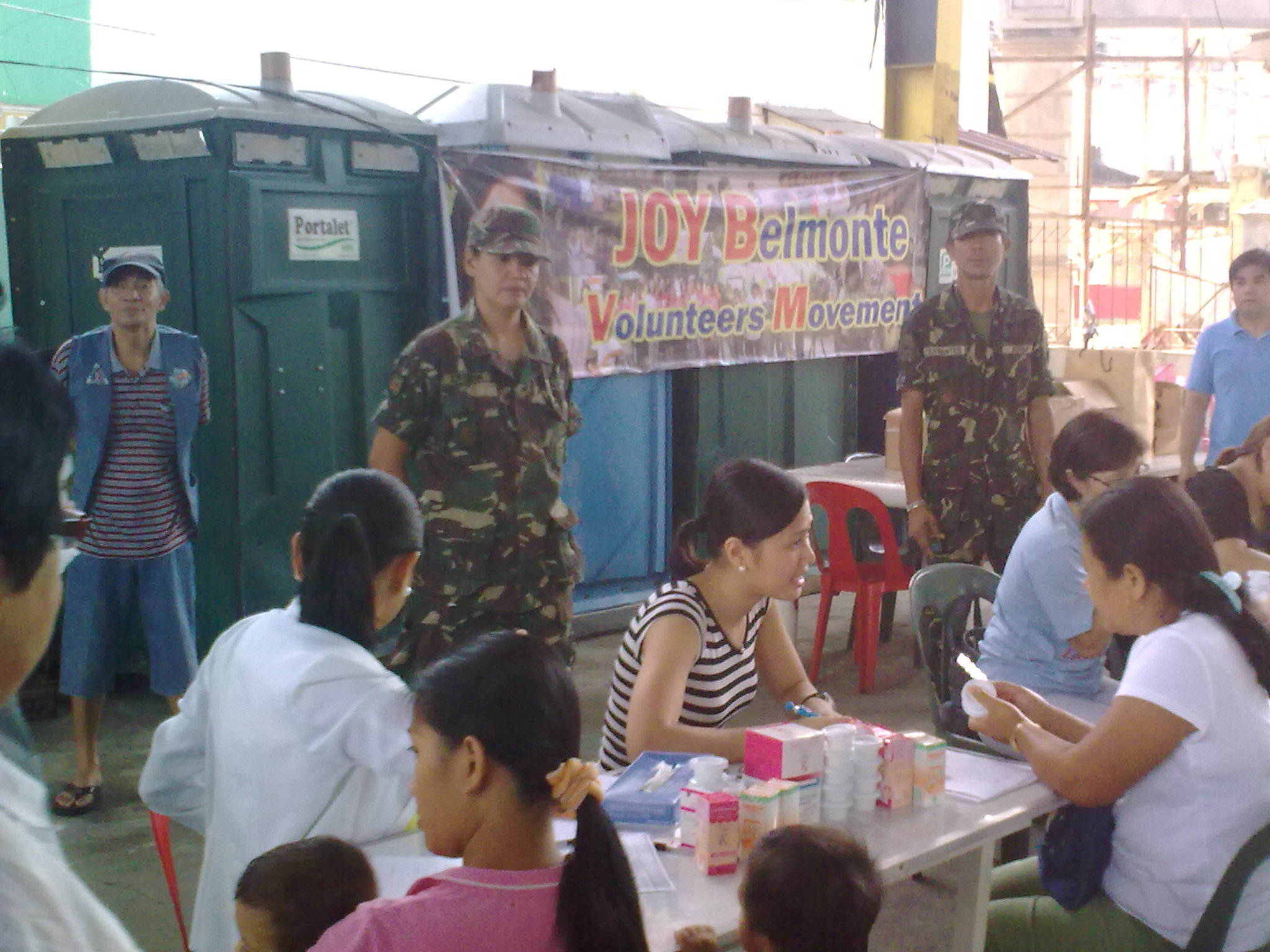
Reservists provide security and assist medical personnel during the conduct of Medical and Dental Civic-Action Program (MEDCAP) at Bgy Nagkaisang Nayon, QC.

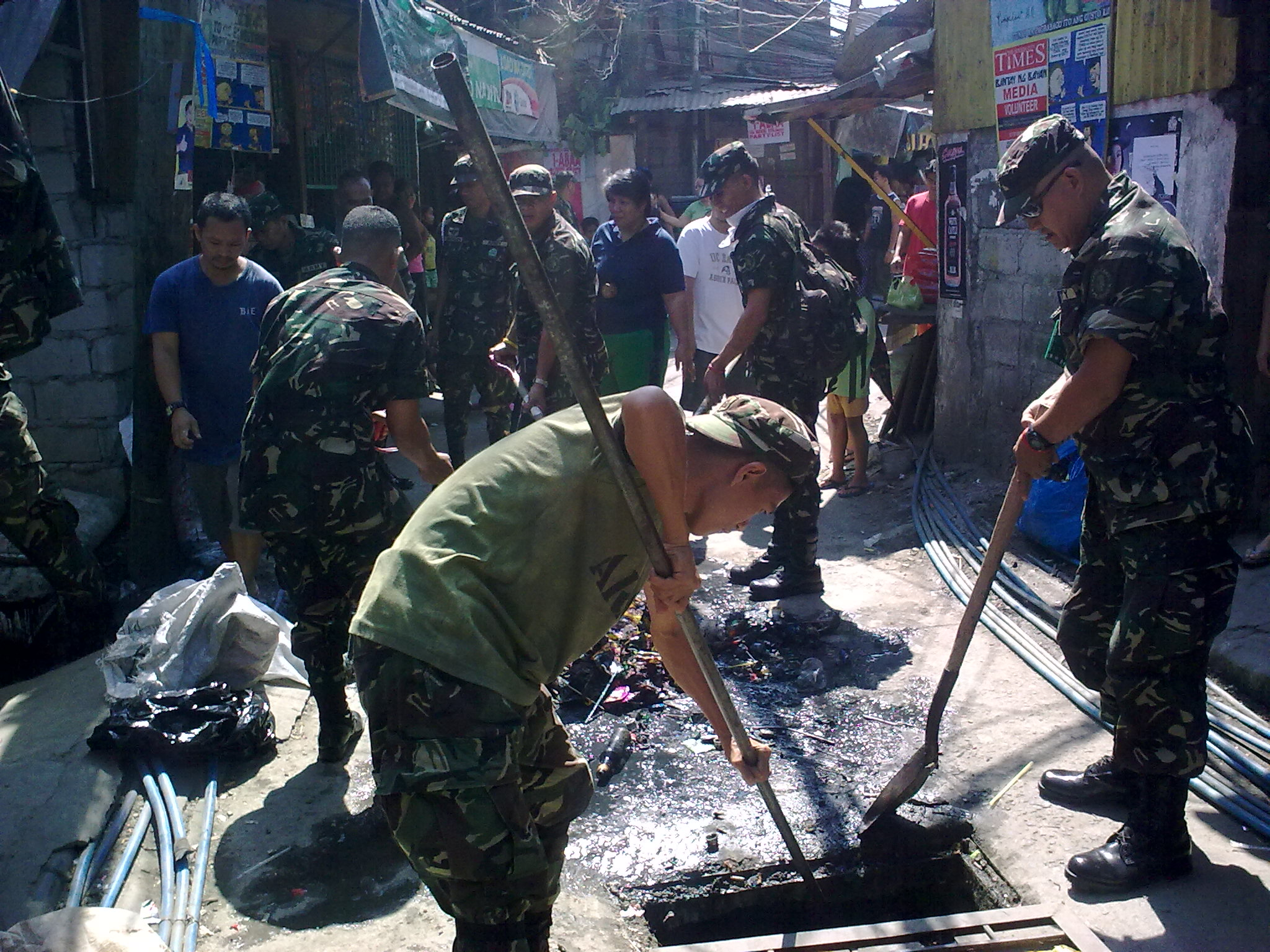
Army Reservists from the 20IB(RR) conduct Clean-up Drive (CMO) at Bgy Old Capitol Site, QC.

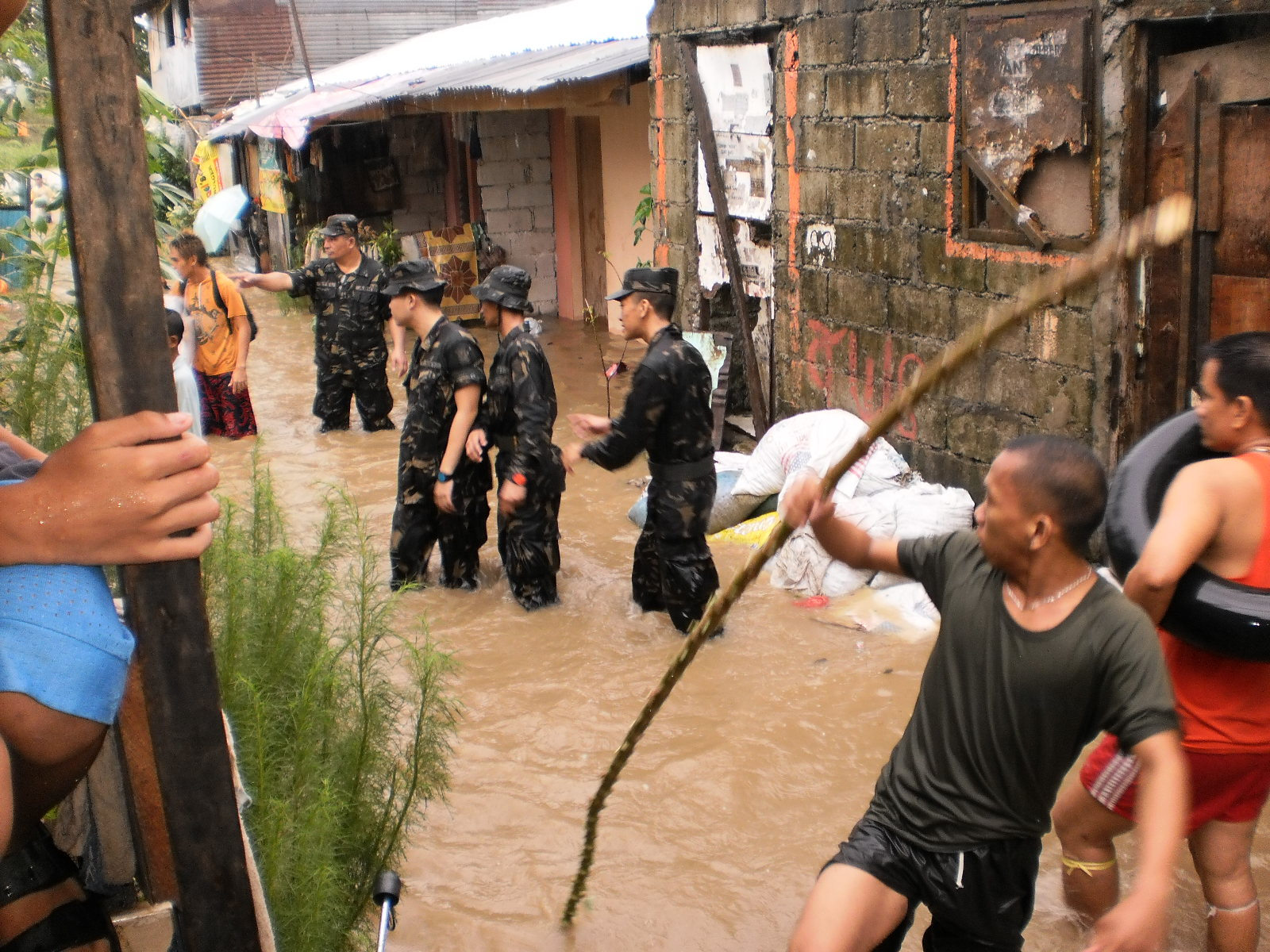
QC Reservists conduct rescue operations at Bgy Bagong Silangan, QC during the height of torrential rains brought by Southwest Monsoon in June 2011.

== See also ==
- Armed Forces of the Philippines Reserve Command
- Philippine Air Force Reserve Command
- Philippine Navy Reserve Command
- Philippine Coast Guard Auxiliary
