= 10th Regional Community Defense Group =

10th Regional Community Defense Group, Reserve Command, Philippine Army
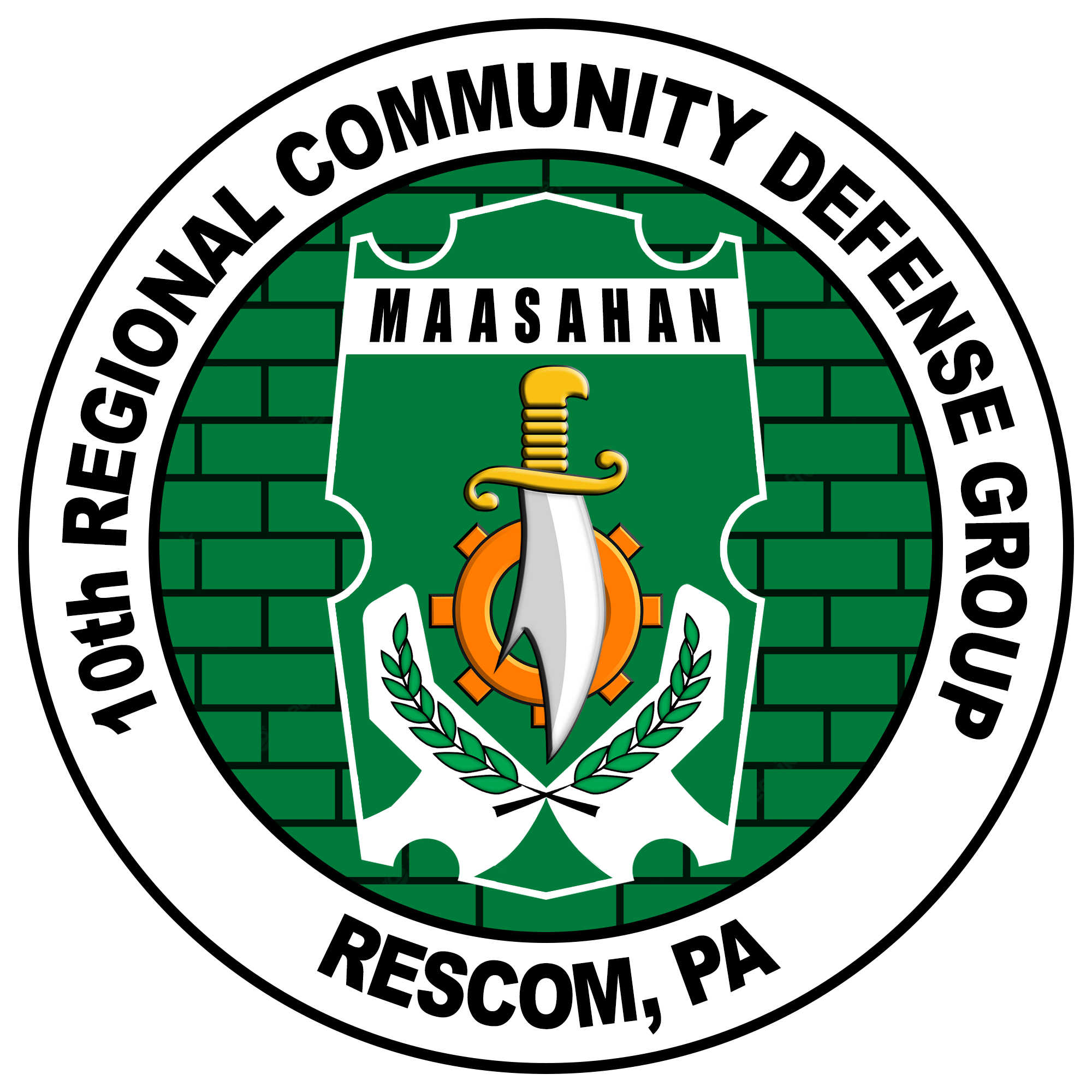
- Unit seal of the 10th Regional Community Defense Group, Reserve Command, Philippine Army
- Active: February 24, 1967 – present
- Country: Philippines
- Branch: Philippine Army
- Type: Army reserve force
- Role: Conventional and Unconventional Warfare, Anti-Guerrilla Operations, Combat Support & Service Support, Force Multiplier, Training, Disaster Rescue & Relief, and Community Service
- Part of: Philippine Army
- Garrison/HQ: Camp Edilberto Evangelista, Patag, Cagayan de Oro City, Misamis Oriental
- Nicknames: "10RCDG", "MAASAHAN", "Citizen-Army Builder in Region X"
- Motto: Citizen-Army Builder in Region X
- Anniversaries: February 24

Commanders
- Commander-in-Chief: President Bongbong Marcos
- Secretary of National Defense: Gilberto C. Teodoro
- Chief of Staff of the Armed Forces of the Philippines: GEN Romeo S. Brawner Jr. PA
- Commanding General of the Philippine Army: LtGen Antonio G. Nafarrete, PA
- Commander: MGEN Ronald Jess S. Alcudia, PA
- Group Commander: COL Bernard T Ragus, PA

Insignia
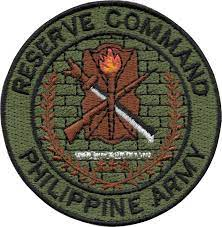
- Patch

The 10th Regional Community Defense Group (10RCDG), Reserve Command, Philippine Army (PA) is a line unit of the Reserve Command, Philippine Army. It is responsible for the reserve force management, organization, and training of reservists in Region X (Northern Mindanao) of the Philippines. The unit is headquartered at Camp Edilberto Evangelista in Cagayan de Oro City and maintains operational centers across the provinces of Misamis Oriental, Camiguin, Bukidnon, and Lanao del Norte.

== History ==
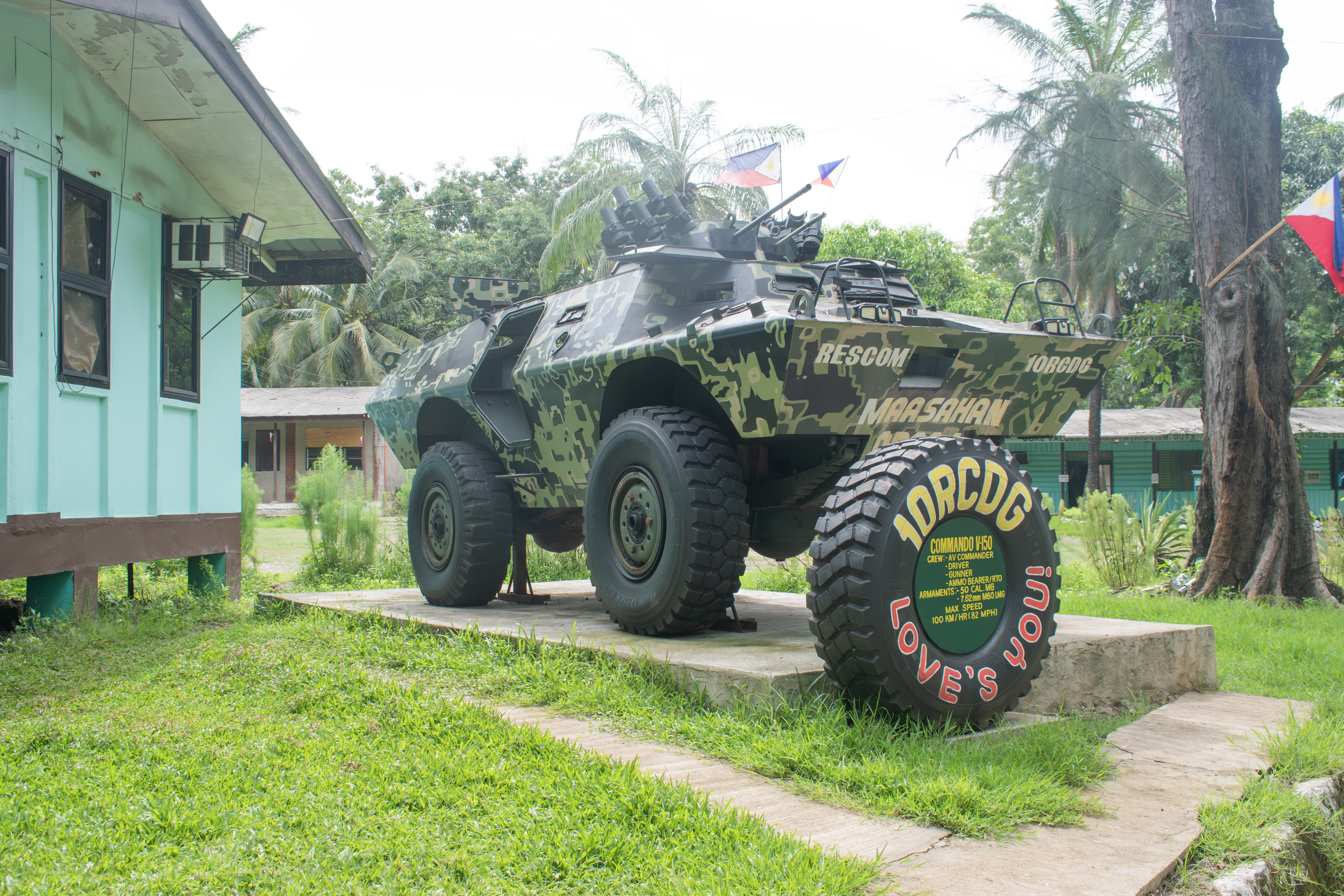
Display Tank Landmark of the 10RCDG, RESCOM, PA at Camp Evangelista, Patag, Cagayan de Oro City.

=== Establishment and early years (1967–1977) ===
The 10th Regional Community Defense Group (10RCDG) was originally established as the Economic Development Unit (EDU) of the 4th Military Area in Camp Evangelista, Cagayan de Oro City on February 24, 1967, per Section 1 of General Orders No. 51, Headquarters 4th Military Area. The unit's initial mission focused on supporting economic development initiatives in Northern Mindanao while maintaining a defense capability.

On May 16, 1967, the EDU was re-designated as the Civic Affairs Unit (CAU) per Section 3 of General Orders No. 99, Headquarters 4th Military Area, expanding its role in civil-military operations. With the disbandment of the 4th Military Area on February 1, 1970, the CAU was re-designated as the Home Defense Affairs Unit (HDAU) of the 4th Infantry Division, Philippine Army, serving as the principal operating arm of the division in implementing the Armed Forces of the Philippines Home Defense strategic program.

=== Army Reserve Command era (1977–1986) ===
On September 1, 1977, during the activation of the Army Reserve Command, the HDAU was transferred to the command and later renumbered as the 10th Home Defense Unit to conform with a regional concept that aligned with the current political subdivision structure of the Philippines.

On March 16, 1986, the 10th Regional Home Defense Unit was re-designated as the 10th Regional Community Defense Unit (10RCDU) per Section 2 of General Orders No. 44, Headquarters Philippine Army. However, the operation of 10RCDU was transferred again to the 4th Infantry Division when the Army Reserve Command was deactivated later that year.

=== Modern reorganization (1992–present) ===
With the reactivation of the Army Reserve Command six years later, the 10th Regional Community Defense Unit was reassigned to the command per Section 2 of General Orders No. 835, Headquarters Philippine Army, on August 4, 1992. The unit was subsequently re-designated as the 10th Regional Community Defense Group on March 1, 1994, per General Orders No. 152, Headquarters Philippine Army, establishing its current organizational structure and expanding its capabilities to meet modern defense requirements.

Since its redesignation, the 10RCDG has played a significant role in disaster response operations, counter-insurgency efforts, and community development programs throughout Northern Mindanao. The unit has participated in humanitarian assistance and disaster relief (HADR) operations during major typhoons and natural calamities affecting Region X.

== Mission and vision ==
=== Mission ===
The mission of the 10th Regional Community Defense Group (10RCDG) is to develop, organize, train, equip, and administer reservists into a capable, responsive, and mobilizable reserve force as an integral component of the total army in the defense of the state. The 10RCDG also participates in socio-economic development efforts in the provinces of Misamis Oriental, Camiguin, Bukidnon, and Lanao del Norte. The unit supports maneuver units in their Development Support and Security Plan (DSSP) efforts to create an environment conducive for sustainable development and a just and lasting peace in the region.

=== Vision ===
The 10th Regional Community Defense Group (10RCDG) envisions itself as a premier army unit committed to providing quality, mobilizable citizen army forces as a component of the total army in pursuit of constitutionally mandated goals and objectives. The unit strives to maintain high standards of training and readiness among its reservist personnel.

== Legal mandate ==
=== Commonwealth Act 1 ===
Commonwealth Act No. 1, particularly Section II, establishes the responsibility of each and every citizen for the defense of the nation. Citizens may be mobilized in the event the national government declares an act of war or emergency.

=== Republic Act 7077 ===
Republic Act No. 7077, also known as the Citizen's Armed Force Act or Reservist Law of 1991, is an act passed into law by the joint house of representatives which clearly provides the policies and procedures in the creation and administration of reservists and reserve units of the Armed Forces of the Philippines. This legislation forms the primary legal foundation for the operations and administration of the 10RCDG and other reserve units throughout the country.

=== Republic Act 9163 ===
Republic Act No. 9163, also known as the National Service Training Program Act or National Service Law of 2001, defines the policies and procedures in administration and training of ROTC Units in relation to the other two components: Civic Welfare Training Service (CWTS) and Literacy Training Service (LTS), of the National Service Training Program (NSTP). This act governs the university and college-based training programs administered by the 10RCDG.

== Training programs ==
Training is the major task handled by the Army Reserve Command and its subordinate units, including the 10RCDG. The unit's primary training arms are the university and college-based Department of Military Science and Tactics-administered mandatory basic and the optional advanced Reserve Officer Training Corps (ROTC), and the territorial unit-administered Basic Citizen's Military Training (BCMT).

=== Reserve Officer Training Corps (ROTC) ===
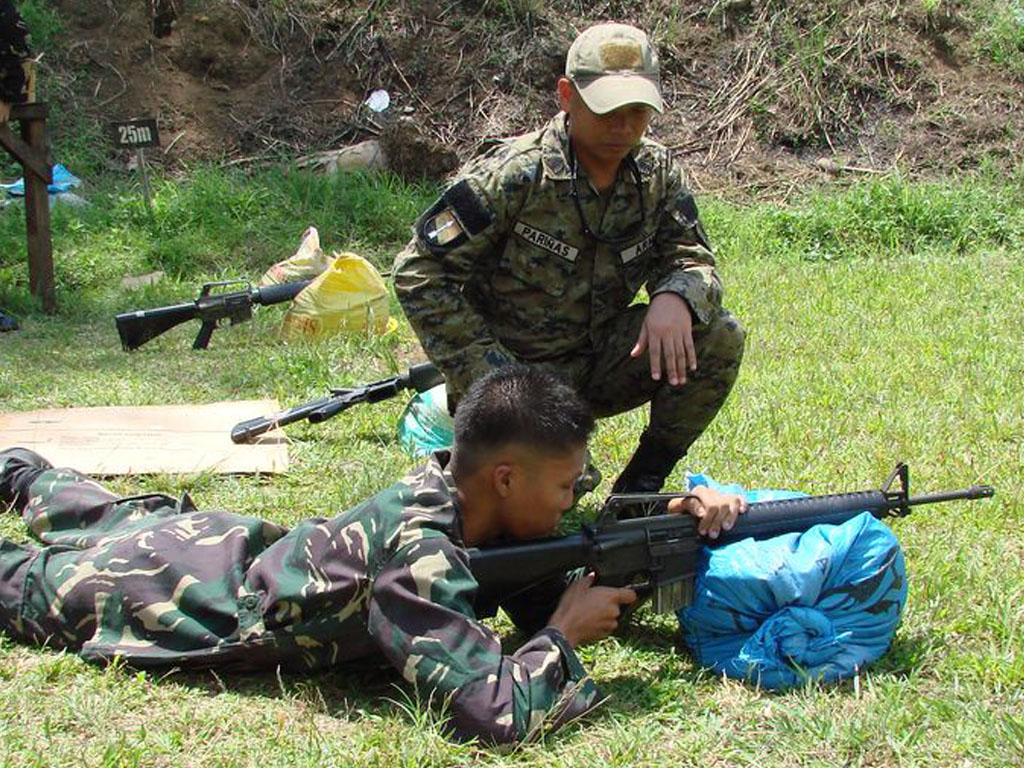
A soldier of the Special Operations Command of the Philippine Army instructs an ROTC cadet officer on the finer points of the M16 rifle

Basic ROTC is the component required of tertiary (college) level students to complete as a requirement for the National Service Training Program. Military subjects are provided similar to how military instructions are conducted in the service academies, and graduates are automatically enlisted in the reserve force of the particular service branch (Army) administering the training.

Advanced ROTC is purely voluntary in nature, and Advanced ROTC Cadets are provided a modest allowance after passing the requirements for their respective Philippine Army Advanced ROTC Examination (PAARE). Completion of Advanced ROTC is considered a graduate qualification in Military Science, and such graduates who subsequently progress to the Probationary Officer Training Course (POTC) are commissioned as 2nd Lieutenants.

The 10RCDG maintains Department of Military Science and Tactics (DMST) offices in various colleges and universities throughout Region X, providing oversight and instruction for ROTC programs in Northern Mindanao.

Other than time-in-grade and merit promotions, rank adjustments are authorized depending on civilian qualifications, as well as their reciprocity to the operating environment.

=== Basic Citizen's Military Training (BCMT) ===
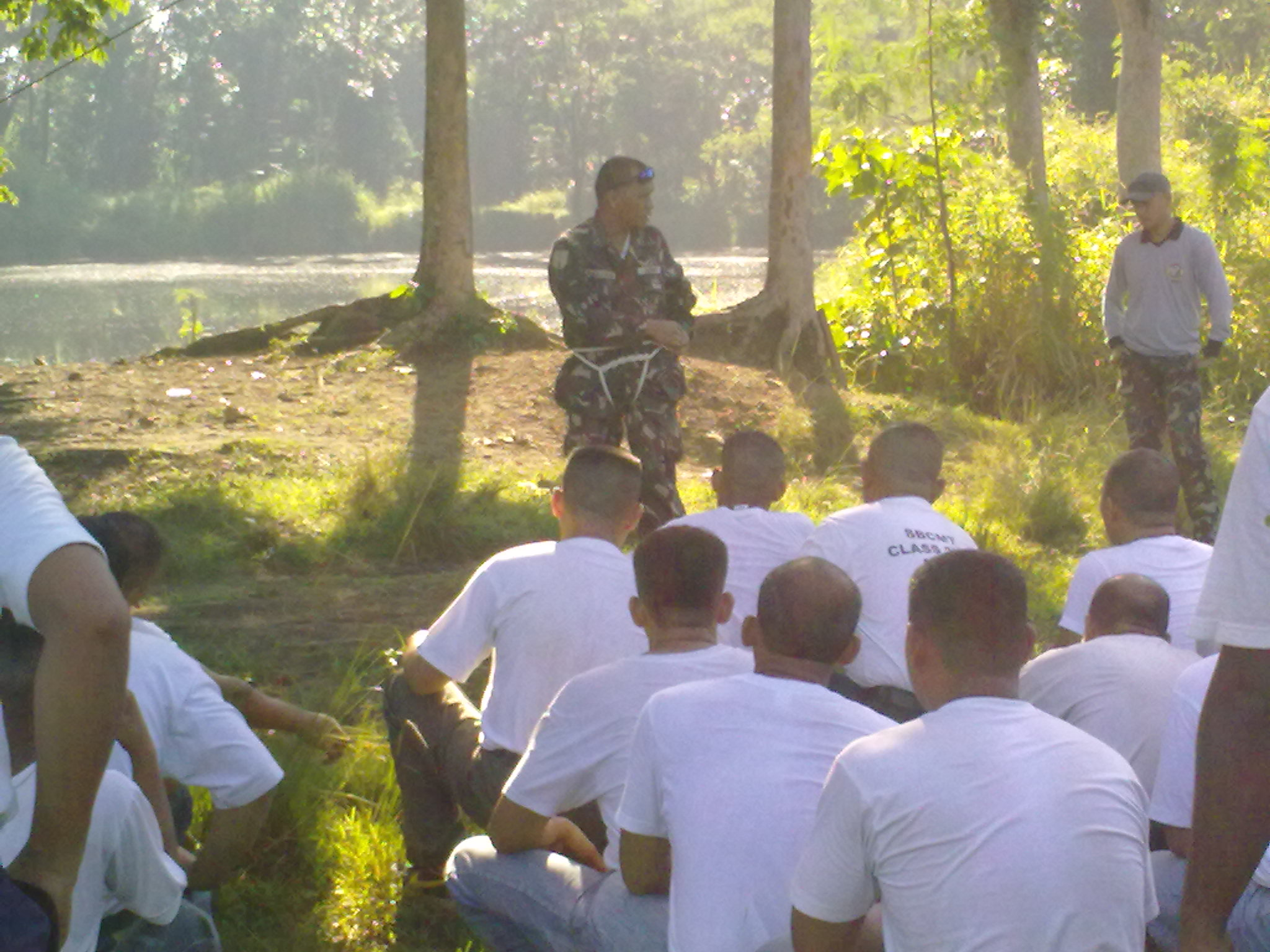
A Sergeant from the Scout Ranger Regiment gives instructions on military rappelling to SBCMT CL45-11 of the 1302nd Community Defense Center.

Basic Citizen's Military Training (BCMT) is a military training course conducted by the Philippine Army through the Army Reserve Command. It is an entry-level training course undertaken by Filipino citizens wanting to enlist in the reserve force.

BCMT instruction is administered by a joint training pool of military instructors from both regular and reserve forces and is usually conducted inside any of the Philippine Army's training camps. Guest instructors are requested from other government agencies and non-government organizations (NGO) for specialized instructions.

Special Basic Citizen's Military Training (SBCMT) is a special course conducted by the Philippine Army in response to a request from a Local Government Unit (LGU). Funding is usually provided by the requesting agency as compared to regular BCMT which receives funding from the Army. The 10RCDG regularly conducts BCMT courses at Camp Evangelista and at various Community Defense Centers throughout Region X.

== Types of reservists ==
There are currently three types of reservists in the Armed Forces of the Philippines (AFP) Reserve Force:

=== Categorization of reservists and reserve units ===
Section 12, Article 5, of Republic Act 7077 breaks down and categorizes reservists and their units based on various criteria cited by this law.

- First Category Reservists - Able-bodied reservists aged eighteen years of age up to thirty-five years of age, inclusive.
- Second Category Reservists - Able-bodied reservists aged thirty-six years of age up to fifty-one years of age, inclusive.
- Third Category Reservists - All able-bodied reservists aged above fifty years of age.

=== Classification of reservists and reserve units ===
Section 13, Article 5, of Republic Act 7077 clearly cites the classification of reservists based on their operational readiness for immediate deployment or mobilization.

- Ready Reserve - Physically fit and tactically current reservist personnel that are always on constant alert and training; ready to mobilize once a mobilization order has been given.
- Standby Reserve - Reservist personnel who do not maintain currency in specialization qualifications but serve as the base for expansion, support and augmentation to the Ready Reserve Force as needed.
- Retired Reserve - Composed of citizens who are qualified for retirement either by length of service or age.

== Operational role ==
The 10RCDG serves as a force multiplier for the Philippine Army's regular units operating in Northern Mindanao. The unit provides trained reservists who can be mobilized during national emergencies, natural disasters, and internal security operations. The Group also participates in community development programs, disaster preparedness training, and civil-military operations throughout Region X.

The unit maintains close coordination with local government units (LGUs), other government agencies, and civil society organizations to enhance its capability in disaster response and community service. During major calamities, the 10RCDG activates its reservist personnel to support evacuation operations, relief distribution, and post-disaster recovery efforts.

== Leadership ==
=== Lineage of commanding officers ===
Group Commanders of 10RCDG, RESCOM, PA are drawn from both the ranks of Regular Army Officers that graduated from either Officer Candidate School (OCS) and the Philippine Military Academy (PMA).

- Col. Alfredo L. Cayton SN O-2931 (GSC) PA (February 1, 1970 – July 18, 1970)
- Col. Benjamin P. Alacon O-5168 (GSC) PA (April 27, 1987 – May 10, 1990)
- Col. Mario P. Enriquez O-99197 FA (GSC) PA (October 1, 1991 – May 1, 1992)
- Col. Cristobal M. Gurrea O-94349 (GSC) PA (January 7, 1993 – April 16, 1994)
- Col. Ricardo G. Nobleza O-6212 MNSA (GSC) PA (February 15, 1997 – October 16, 1998)
- Col. Juanito P. Cabayao O-6797 MNSA (GSC) PA (February 18, 1999 – October 1, 1999)
- Col. Renato T. Jamora Sr. O-5931 (GSC) PA (November 1, 1999 – August 16, 2000)
- Col. Alexis G. Afdal O-6813 OS (JSSC) PA (August 15, 2000 – February 15, 2002)
- Col. Antero K. Bathan O-103372 (JSC) PA (February 15, 2002 – January 6, 2003)
- Col. Pelagio V. Cruz Jr. O-107080 INF (GSC) PA (January 7, 2003 – December 16, 2005)
- Col. Samuel O. Cunanan OS (GSC) PA (December 16, 2005 – February 2, 2007)
- Col. Samuel Felipe FA (GSC) PA (February 3, 2007 – August 15, 2009)
- Col. Ramon B. Florece INF (GSC) PA (August 16, 2009 – December 2, 2011)
- Col. John V. Oberio INF (GSC) PA (December 3, 2011 – April 7, 2013)
- Col. Erick G. Edison INF (GSC) PA (April 8, 2013 – August 16, 2014)
- Col. Honorio M. Abinojare CE (GSC) PA (July 1, 2015 – May 8, 2017)
- Col. Febie N. Lameranz INF (GSC) PA (May 8, 2017 – August 1, 2020)
- Col. Edmund P. Abella INF (GSC) PA (August 1, 2020 – September 16, 2020) (OIC)
- Col. Eduardo M. Monjardin INF (GSC) PA (September 16, 2020 – November 21, 2023)
- Col. Luciano M. Caiman Jr. INF (GSC) PA (November 21, 2023 – July 26, 2025)
- Col. Bernard T. Ragus FS (GSC) PA (July 26, 2025 – present)

== Organization ==
The 10th RCDG is currently composed of the following units:

=== Base unit ===
- Headquarters & Headquarters Service Battalion - Provides command, control, and administrative support to the entire 10RCDG organization

=== Community Defense Centers ===
Community Defense Centers (CDC) serve as the primary territorial units responsible for reservist management and training in their respective areas of responsibility.

- 1001st Community Defense Center - Camp Edilberto Evangelista, Patag, Cagayan de Oro City, Misamis Oriental
- 1002nd Community Defense Center - Camp Climaco Pintoy, Suarez, Iligan City, Lanao del Norte
- 1003rd Community Defense Center - Camp Osito D Bahian, Impalambong, Malaybalay City, Bukidnon
- 1004th Community Defense Center - Old Capitol Building, Mambajao, Camiguin

=== Ready Reserve Infantry Battalions ===
Ready Reserve Infantry Battalions are composed of trained and tactically proficient reservists capable of immediate mobilization for combat and support operations.

- 1002nd Ready Reserve Infantry Battalion - Camp Climaco Pintoy, Suarez, Iligan City, Lanao del Norte
- 1003rd Ready Reserve Infantry Battalion - Camp Osito D Bahian, Impalambong, Malaybalay City, Bukidnon
- 1005th Ready Reserve Infantry Battalion - Camp Edilberto Evangelista, Patag, Cagayan de Oro City, Misamis Oriental
- 1006th Ready Reserve Infantry Battalion - Camp Ranao, Marawi City, Lanao del Sur
- 1007th Ready Reserve Infantry Battalion - Mambajao, Camiguin

=== Reserve Brigades ===
Reserve Brigades provide higher-level command and control for multiple Ready Reserve Infantry Battalions during mobilization and large-scale operations.

- 2001st Infantry Brigade (Ready Reserve)
- 2002nd Infantry Brigade (Ready Reserve)

== Awards and decorations ==
The 10RCDG has received various awards and decorations in recognition of its service to the nation, particularly in disaster response operations and internal security missions.

=== Campaign streamers ===
Award Streamer	Streamer Name	Operation	Date Awarded	Reference
	Presidential Unit Citation Badge	SAR/DRR Operations, TS Ketsana & TS Parma	February 4, 2010	General Orders No. 112, GHQ-AFP, dated February 4, 2010
	Presidential Unit Citation Badge	General Elections, Philippines	July 1, 2010	General Orders No. 641, GHQ-AFP, dated July 1, 2010

=== Badges ===
Military Badge	Badge Name	Operation	Date Awarded	Reference
	AFP Election Duty Badge	General Elections, Philippines	May 21, 2010	General Orders No. 513, GHQ-AFP, dated May 21, 2010

== Community engagement ==
The 10RCDG actively participates in various community development programs in Northern Mindanao, including:

- Civic-military operations and community assistance projects
- Medical and dental civic action programs (MEDCAP/DENTCAP)
- Engineering civic action programs (ENCAP)
- Disaster preparedness and risk reduction training for local communities
- Environmental conservation and reforestation programs
- Youth development and education support initiatives
- Livelihood and skills training programs for communities

The unit maintains partnerships with local government units, educational institutions, and civil society organizations to implement these programs effectively across Region X.

== See also ==
- Armed Forces of the Philippines Reserve Command
- Philippine Army Reserve Command
- Philippine Air Force Reserve Command
- Philippine Navy Reserve Command
- Home Defense Command
- Philippine Coast Guard Auxiliary
- Reserve Officers' Training Corps (Philippines)

== Bibliography ==
- The Training Committee, Military Science 21 ROTC Manual, 2001, NCRRCDG, ARESCOM.
- The Philippine Army Public Affairs Office, The Philippine Army: First 100 Years, 1997, OTAPA.
- Pobre, Cesar P. (2006). History of the Armed Forces of the Filipino People. New Day Publishers. ISBN 9711010410.
