= 7th Regional Community Defense Group =

- Coat of Arms of the 7RCDG
- Active: January 2, 1982 – Present
- Country: Philippines
- Branch: Philippine Army
- Type: Army Reserve Force
- Role: Conventional and Unconventional Warfare, Anti-Guerrilla Operations, Combat Support & Service Support, Force Multiplier, Training, Disaster Rescue & Relief, and Community Service
- Part of: Under the Philippine Army
- Garrison/HQ: Camp Rajah Lapu-lapu, Cebu City, Cebu
- Nicknames: ARESCOM,RESCOM
- Motto: Committed citizen army builder
- Anniversaries: 2 January
- Decorations: Philippine Republic Presidential Unit Citation Badge

Commanders
- Current commander: COL RAYMUNDO BAÑARES INF (GSC) PA
- Notable commanders: COL NORMAN GOMEZ INF (GSC) PA

Insignia
- Unit Patch: ARESCOM Emblem/ RCDG Unit Patch

The 7th Regional Community Defense Group, Army Reserve Command; is a line unit of the Philippine Army Reserve Command. It was created for the sole purpose of Reserve Force management, procurement, and organisation in the areas encompassing Central Visayas.

== Mission ==
To develop, organize train, equip and administer a highly competent mobilizeable reserve force as an integral component of the total army and in the defense of the region and to participate in socio-economic development effort.

== Vision ==
A capable and responsible mobilizeable Citizen Armed Force as a component of the total army in pursuit of its constitutionally mandated expanded mission.

== Training ==
Training is the major task handled by 7RCDG, ARESCOM. Its primary arms are the university/college-based Department of Military Science and Tactics-administered mandatory basic and the optional advanced Reserve Officer Training Corps (ROTC); and the territorial unit-administered Basic Citizen's Military Training (BCMT).

Basic ROTC and BCMT graduates are enlisted as Privates in the Reserve Force, while advanced ROTC graduates are enlisted as Sergeants. Completion of Advance ROTC is considered a graduate qualification in Military Science, and such graduates who subsequently progress to the Probationary Officer Training Course (POTC) are commissioned as 2nd Lieutenants.

Other than time-in-grade and merit promotions, rank adjustments are authorized depending on civilian qualifications, as well as their reciprocity to the operating environment.

== Types of reservists ==
There are currently two types of reservists in the Armed Forces of the Philippines (AFP) Reserve Force:

- Ready Reservists: physically-fit and tactically-current reservist personnel that are always on constant alert and training; ready to mobilise once a mobilisation order has been given.
- Standby Reservists: reservist personnel who do not maintain currency in specialization qualifications but the base for expansion, support and augmentation to the Ready Reserve Force as needed.

== Units ==
The 7RCDG has several line units under its command, making the administration and training of reservists more compartmentalized and territorial based.

=== Base Units ===
- Headquarters & Headquarters Service Company
- ROTC Training Unit
- Citizens Military Training Unit
- Reservist Management Information Systems Office

=== Line Units ===
- 701st (CEBU) Community Defense Center - Camp Rajah Lapu-lapu, Cebu City, Cebu
- 702nd (BOHOL) Community Defense Center - Camp Bernido, Dao District, Tagbilaran City, Bohol
- 703rd (NEGROS ORIENTAL) Community Defense Center - Camp Leon Kilat, Tanjay, Negros Oriental
- 704th (SIQUIJOR) Community Defense Center - Camp Kampilan, Siquijor, Siquijor

=== Reserve Divisions ===
- 19th Infantry Division (Ready Reserve)

=== Reserve Battalions ===
- 1st Cebu Infantry Battalion (Ready Reserve) - Sudlon, Lahug, Cebu
- 1st Bohol Infantry Battalion (Ready Reserve) - Camp Gov Bernido, Dao District, Tagbilaran City, Bohol
- 1st Negros Oriental Infantry Battalion (Ready Reserve) - Silliman University Cpd, Dumaguete

== Awards and decorations ==
=== Campaign streamers ===
Award Streamer	Streamer Name	Operation	Date Awarded	Reference
	Presidential Unit Citation Badge	General Elections, Philippines	1 July 2010	General Orders No. 641, GHQ-AFP, dtd 1 July '10

=== Badges ===
Military Badge	Badge Name	Operation	Date Awarded	Reference
	AFP Election Duty Badge	General Elections, Philippines	21 May 2010	General Orders No. 513, GHQ-AFP, dtd 21 May '10

== See also ==
- Philippine Army Reserve Command
