= 1st Regional Community Defense Group =

- Coat of Arms of the 1RCDG
- Active: May 1, 1982 – Present
- Country: Philippines
- Branch: Philippine Army
- Type: Army Reserve Force
- Role: Conventional and Unconventional Warfare, Anti-Guerrilla Operations, Combat Support & Service Support, Force Multiplier, Training, Disaster Rescue & Relief, and Community Service
- Part of: Under the Philippine Army
- Garrison/HQ: Camp Lt Tito B Abat, Manaoag, Pangasinan
- Nicknames: ARESCOM,RESCOM
- Motto: Committed citizen army builder
- Anniversaries: 1 May
- Decorations: Philippine Republic Presidential Unit Citation Badge

Insignia
- Unit Patch: ARESCOM Emblem/ RCDG Unit Patch

The 1st Regional Community Defense Group, Army Reserve Command is a line unit of the Army Reserve Command of the Philippine Army. It was created for the sole purpose of Reserve Force management, procurement, and organisation in the areas encompassing Northern and Central Luzon.

== Training ==
Training is the major task handled by the 1st Regional Community Defense Group. Its primary arms are the university/college-based Department of Military Science and Tactics-administered mandatory basic and the optional advanced Reserve Officer Training Corps; and the territorial unit-administered Basic Citizen's Military Training.

Basic Reserve Officer Training Corps and Basic Citizen's Military Training graduates are enlisted as privates in the Reserve Force, while advanced Reserve Officer Training Corps graduates are enlisted as sergeants. Completion of Advanced Reserve Officer Training Corps is considered a graduate qualification in military science, and such graduates who subsequently progress to the Probationary Officer Training Course are commissioned as second lieutenants.

Other than time-in-grade and merit promotions, rank adjustments are authorized depending on civilian qualifications, as well as their reciprocity to the operating environment.

== Types of reservists ==
There are currently two types of reservists in the Armed Forces of the Philippines Reserve Force:

- Ready Reservists: physically-fit and tactically-current reservist personnel that are always on constant alert and training; ready to mobilise once a mobilisation order has been given.
- Standby Reservists: reservist personnel who do not maintain currency in specialization qualifications but the base for expansion, support and augmentation to the Ready Reserve Force as needed.

== Units ==
The 1st Regional Community Defense Group has several line units under its command, making the administration and training of reservists more compartmentalized and territorial based.

=== Base Units ===
- Headquarters and Headquarters Service Company
- Reserve Officer Training Corps Training Unit
- Citizens Military Training Unit
- Reservist Management Information Systems Office

=== Line Units ===
- 101st (ILN) Community Defense Center - Camp Valentin Juan, Laoag, Ilocos Norte
- 102nd (ILS) Community Defense Center - Camp Elpidio Quirino, Bulag-Bantay, Ilocos Sur
- 103rd (LUN) Community Defense Center - Camp J Laberinto, Naguilian, La Union
- 104th (PGN-W) Community Defense Center - Isidro Norte, Binmaley, Pangasinan
- 105th (PGN-E) Community Defense Center - Camp Lt Tito B Abat, Manaoag, Pangasinan
- 106th (BNT) Community Defense Center - Athletic Bowl, Baguio City
- 107th (ABR) Community Defense Center - Camp Juan Villamor, Bangued, Abra
- 108th (MTP) Community Defense Center - Bontoc, Mountain Province

=== Reserve Divisions ===
- 16th Infantry Division Ready Reserve (Cp Tito Abat, Manaoag, Pangasinan)
- 17th Infantry Division Ready Reserve (Cp Eldridge, Los Baños, Laguna)
- 5th Infantry (Ready Reserve) Division, PA (Cp Elpidio Quirino, Bulag, Bantay, Isabela)
- 12th Infantry (Ready Reserve) Division, PA (Cp Juan Villamor, Bangued, Abra)

== Awards and decorations ==
=== Campaign streamers ===
Award Streamer	Streamer Name	Operation	Date Awarded	Reference
	Presidential Unit Citation Badge	SAR/DRR Ops, TS Ketsana & TS Parma	4 February 2010	General Orders No. 112, GHQ-AFP, dtd 04 Feb '10
	Presidential Unit Citation Badge	General Elections, Philippines	1 July 2010	General Orders No. 641, GHQ-AFP, dtd 1 July '10

=== Badges ===
Military Badge	Badge Name	Operation	Date Awarded	Reference
	AFP Election Duty Badge	General Elections, Philippines	21 May 2010	General Orders No. 513, GHQ-AFP, dtd 21 May '10

== See also ==
- Philippine Army Reserve Command
