= Philippine Coast Guard Auxiliary =

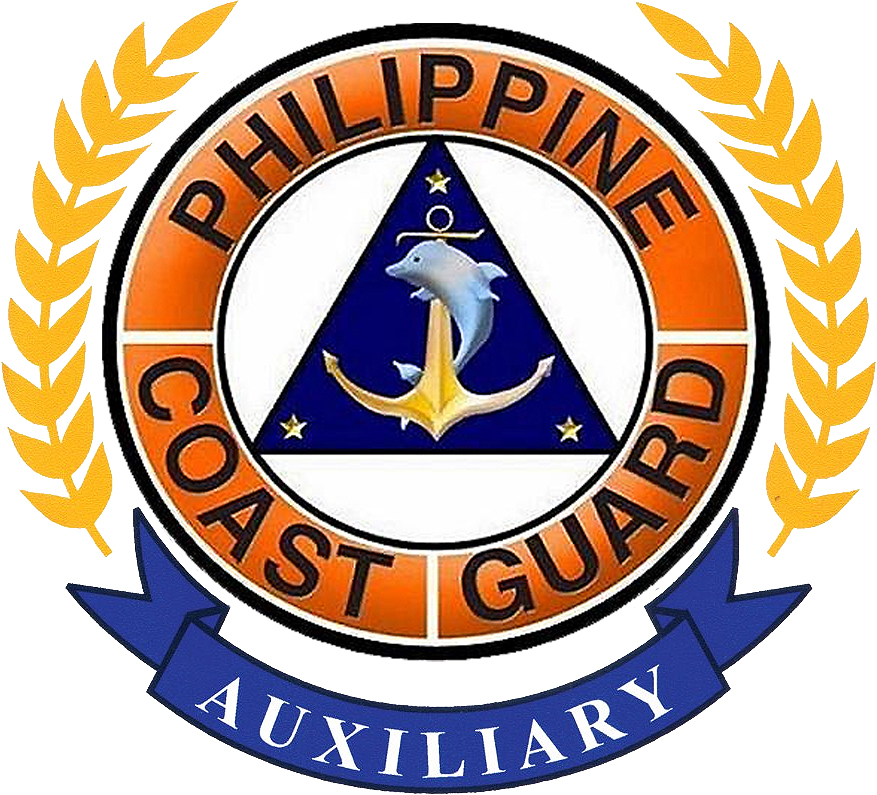
- Seal of the Philippine Coast Guard Auxiliary
- Founded: February 9, 1972; 54 years ago
- Country: Philippines
- Branch: Philippine Coast Guard
- Type: Volunteer uniformed auxiliary service
- Role: Search and rescue Disaster relief
- Size: 5,000 volunteers

Commanders
- Commandant of the Coast Guard: Admiral Ronnie Gil Gavan

The Philippine Coast Guard Auxiliary (PCGA) is a volunteer civilian organization which is under the direct control and supervision of the commandant of the Philippine Coast Guard.

== History ==
The Philippine Coast Guard Auxiliary (PCGA) was established on February 9, 1972. On that date during a gathering at the Philippine Navy Officers' Club commemorating the Philippine Navy Day, the Coast Guard Commandant announced the intention of the Navy Flag Officer-in-Command to form a civilian volunteer unit to assist the Philippine Coast Guard (PCG). The attendants of the gathering supported the plan including the members of the Manila Yacht Club leading to the formation of what was later known as the PCGA.

The current iteration of the PCGA is institutionalized by Republic Act No. 9993 or the PCG Law of 2009.

== Role and function ==
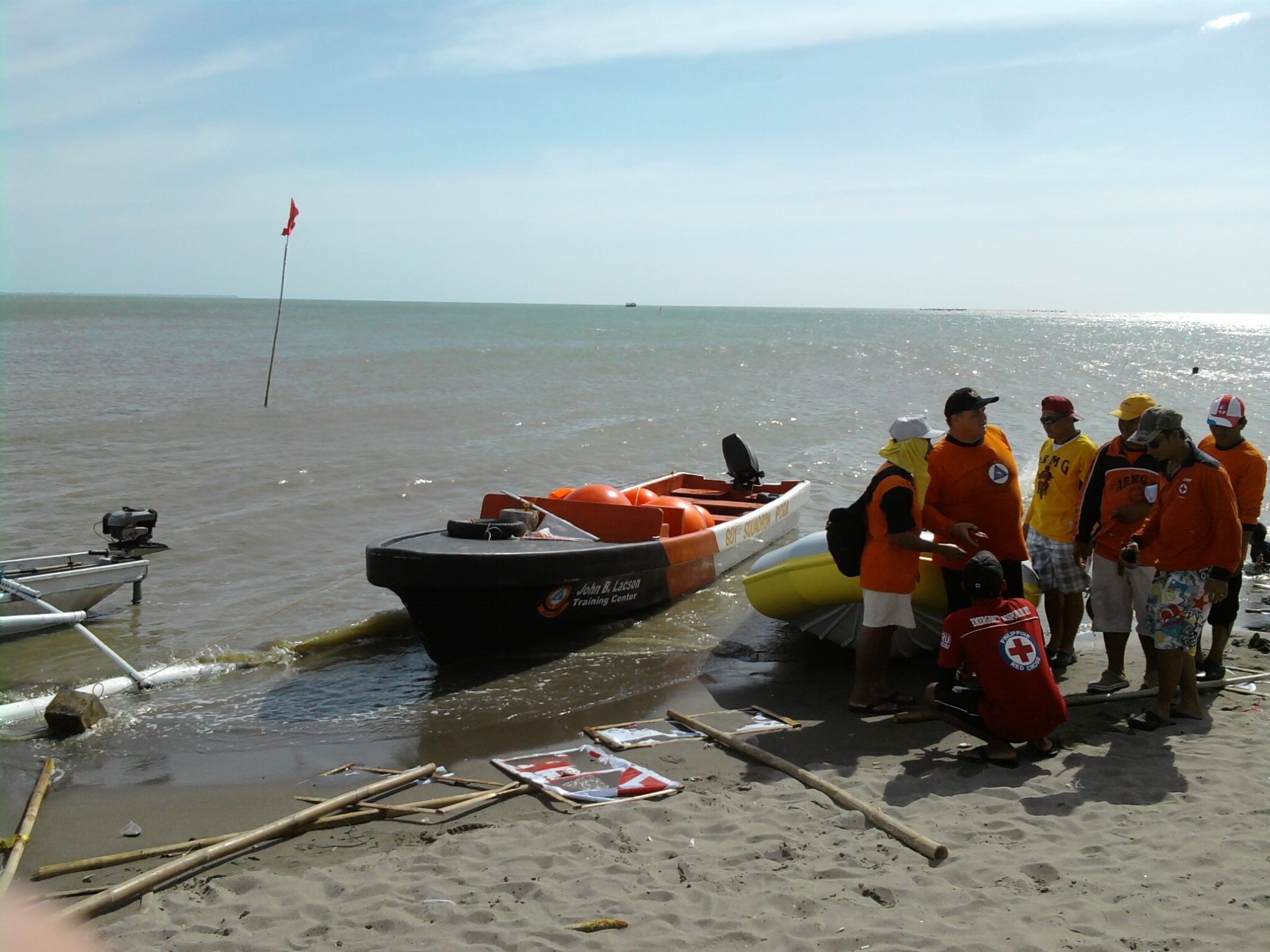
Rescue boat and personnel of the Philippine Coast Guard Auxiliary at the 2013 Paraw Regatta, Villa Beach, Villa de Arevalo, Iloilo City

The PCGA assists the Philippine Coast Guard (PCG) but is not directly part of the PCG. This includes assistance in relief and search and rescue operations.

== Membership ==
PCGA members are uniformed volunteers. However, they are not commissioned officers or enlisted personnel of the PCG and therefore had distinct uniforms and insignia from the regular coast guard. Since the PCGA often is involved in search and rescue operations, its members include boat and shipping company owners. Previously the PCGA was open to foreign citizens. As of 2018, there were no perceived security threat at the time. However, the PCGA made its vetting process stricter in 2025.

Since Admiral Ronnie Gil Gavan's assumption as PCG commandant in 2023, PCGA members are required to secure national clearances. In 2024, there are about 5,000 PCGA members.

=== Notable members ===
- VADM Liza Araneta Marcos, First Lady of the Philippines and wife of President Bongbong Marcos
- RADM Larry Gadon, disbarred lawyer; Presidential Adviser for Poverty Alleviation of the Bongbong Marcos Administration since 2023
- COMMO Lucy Torres-Gomez, actress; Mayor, Ormoc City, Leyte
- COMMO Luis Manzano, actor, host
- LCDR Nico Bolzico, Argentine businessman
- LCDR Matteo Guidicelli, actor; also a commissioned Second Lieutenant in the Philippine Army Reserve Command
- LCDR Erwan Heussaff, actor, model, chef
- LCDR Diether Ocampo, actor
- CAPT Gerald Anderson, actor; also a Private in the Philippine Army Reserve Command
- ENS Julia Barretto, actress
- PO3 Nesthy Petecio, Olympic silver medalist (featherweight), 2020 Summer Olympics; bronze medalist (featherweight), 2024 Summer Olympics
