= 3rd Regional Community Defense Group =

- Country: Philippines
- Branch: Philippine Army
- Type: Army Reserve Force
- Role: Conventional and Unconventional Warfare, Anti-Guerrilla Operations, Combat Support & Service Support, Force Multiplier, Training, Disaster Rescue & Relief, and Community Service
- Part of: Under the Philippine Army
- Garrison/HQ: Camp Gen Servillano T Aquino, San Miguel, Tarlac
- Nicknames: Army Reserve Command (ARESCOM),RESCOM
- Motto: Committed citizen army builder
- Decorations: Philippine Republic Presidential Unit Citation Badge

Commanders
- Current commander: Col. Mario Lito I. Retirva

Insignia
- Unit Patch: ARESCOM Emblem/ RCDG Unit Patch

The 3rd Regional Community Defense Group, Army Reserve Command is a line unit of the Army Reserve Command of the Philippine Army. It was created for the sole purpose of Reserve Force management, procurement, and organisation in the areas encompassing Central Luzon.

Community Defense Centers (CDC) under 3RCDG.

• 301st (NEC) CDC – Camp Gen Tinio, Bangad, Cabanatuan City

• 302nd (TLC) CDC – Camp Gen Aquino, San Miguel, Tarlac City

• 303rd (PAM) CDC – Belen Homesite, Angeles City, Pampanga

• 304th (BUL) CDC – Brgy Lico, San Rafael, Bulacan

• 305th (BAT) CDC – Brgy Camacho, Balanga, Bataan City

• 306th (ZAM) CDC – Zone II, Zambales Sports Center, Iba, Zambales

• 307th (AUR) CDC – ATC Compound, Baler, Aurora
