= 2202nd Infantry Brigade (Ready Reserve) =

2202nd Infantry Brigade Combined Arms (Reserve) Brigada de Infanteria Ligera de Reserva Activa 22
- Country: Philippines
- Allegiance: Republic of the Philippines
- Branch: Philippine Army
- Type: Army Reserve; Light Infantry Brigade
- Role: Performs multiple military roles in Conventional and Unconventional Warfare, Humanitarian Assistance and Disaster Response (HA/DR), and Civil-Military Operations (CMO)
- Size: 3 Infantry Battalions and 1 Field Artillery Battery of trained and operational citizen-soldiers
- Part of: 22nd Infantry Division (Ready Reserve), Philippine Army Reserve Command
- Garrison/HQ: Magsaysay Park Complex, Davao City. Metro Davao
- Nickname: Eagle (Agila) Brigade
- Mascot: Philippine eagle
- Battle honours: None

Commanders
- Current commander: COL ISIDRO T UNGAB GSC PA (RES)
- Sergeant Major: MSg Lemuel A Cirunay PA (Res)
- Notable commanders: COL ISIDRO T UNGAB GSC PA (RES); LTC LEOPOLDO FERNANDO GSC PA (RES)

Insignia
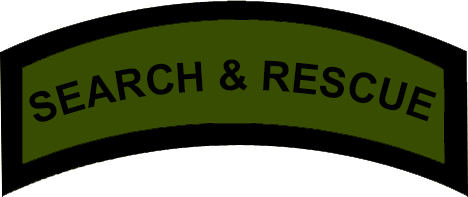
- Search and Rescue Tab

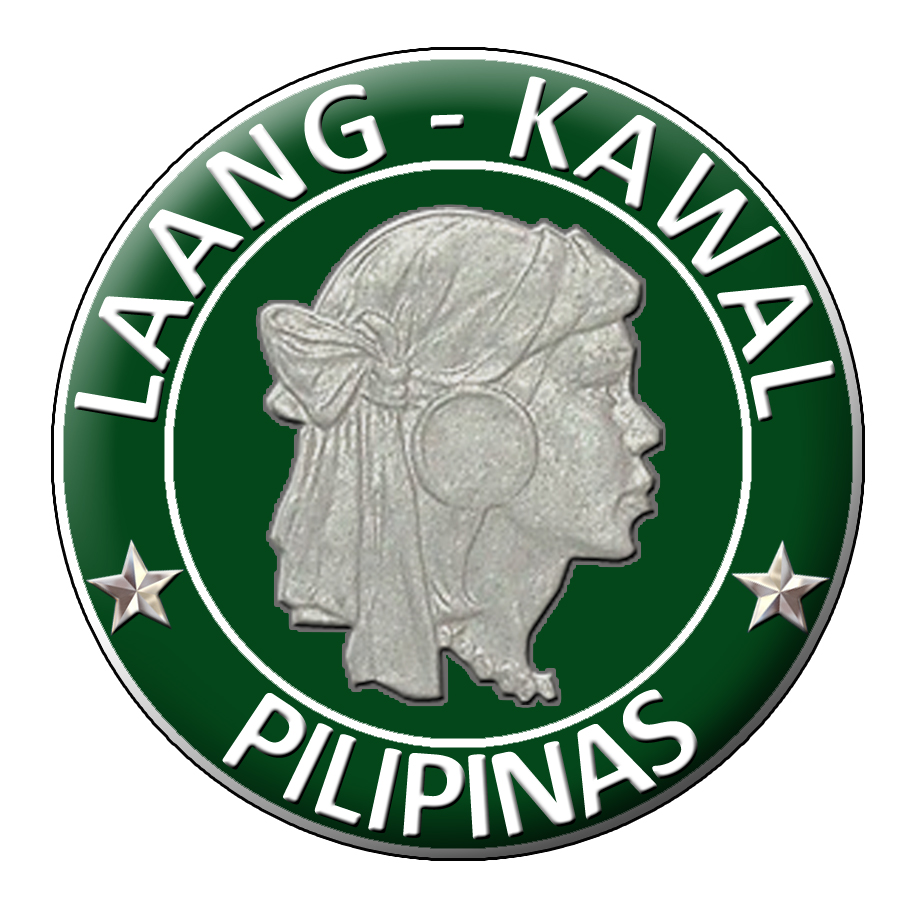
- Laang Kawal Seal

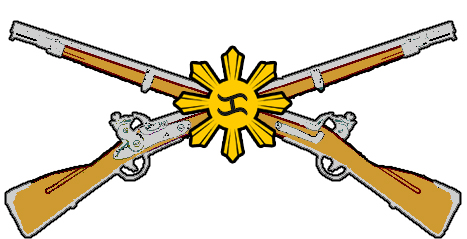
- Philippine Army Infantry Branch Insignia

The 2202nd Infantry Brigade (Ready Reserve), Philippine Army, known as the Eagle Brigade, is one of the Army Reserve Command's ready reserve infantry Brigades organic to the 22nd infantry Division (Ready Reserve).

The unit specializes in Urban Warfare, Urban Search and Rescue, Humanitarian Assistance and Disaster Relief, and Civil-Military Operations. It operates mostly in the Davao del Sur (Region 11)Province.

== Mobilization Center ==
The 2202nd Infantry Brigade's mobilization center is the 1105th Community Defense Center, 11RCDG, ARESCOM at 76-A Brgy Bucana, Matina, Davao City.

== Garrisons ==
The Brigade Headquarters is strategically located on the Magsaysay Complex near the headquarters of the Task Force-Davao, JTF HARIBON at Sta. Ana Wharf, Davao City, allowing the Brigade to readily deploy the Battalions at any time during a declaration of State of emergency by the national government or as requested by the City Government (LGU).

The Advance Command Post which houses the Support and Rifle Platoons is garrisoned at the southern side of Davao City at Toril Poblacion.

== Base Units ==
- Headquarters & Headquarters Company: (Magsaysay Park)

* Command Section
* Headquarters Company
*  Military Police Section (cell
*  Civil Military Operations Section
*  Chaplain Section
*  Military Intelligence Section

- Headquarters Service Support Company: (Toril)

*  Headquarters Section
*  Military Intelligence Section
*  Support Platoon 
 * Platoon Headquarters
 * Maintenance Section
 * Transportation Section
 * Supply Section
 * MP Section (attached)

*  Search and Rescue (DRRO) Platoon/ Medical Platoon
 * Platoon Headquarters
 * 2 DRRO squads for first responders/ search and rescue
 * Dental Section

== Line Units ==
- 1101st Infantry Battalion (Ready Reserve) (Digos City)
- 1105th Infantry Battalion (Ready Reserve) (Davao City)
- 1106th Infantry Battalion (Ready Reserve) (Malita)
- Alpha Battery (Field Artillery) (attached)
- 1st Mechanized Infantry Company(Ready Reserve) (Davao)

== See also ==
- 1502nd Infantry Brigade (Ready Reserve)
- 22nd Infantry Division (Philippines)
- 202nd Infantry Battalion (Ready Reserve)
- 1st Technical & Administrative Services Battalion (Ready Reserve)
- 2203rd Infantry Brigade (Ready Reserve)
