= 1051st Technical & Administrative Services Unit (Ready Reserve) =

1051 Technical & Administrative Services Unit
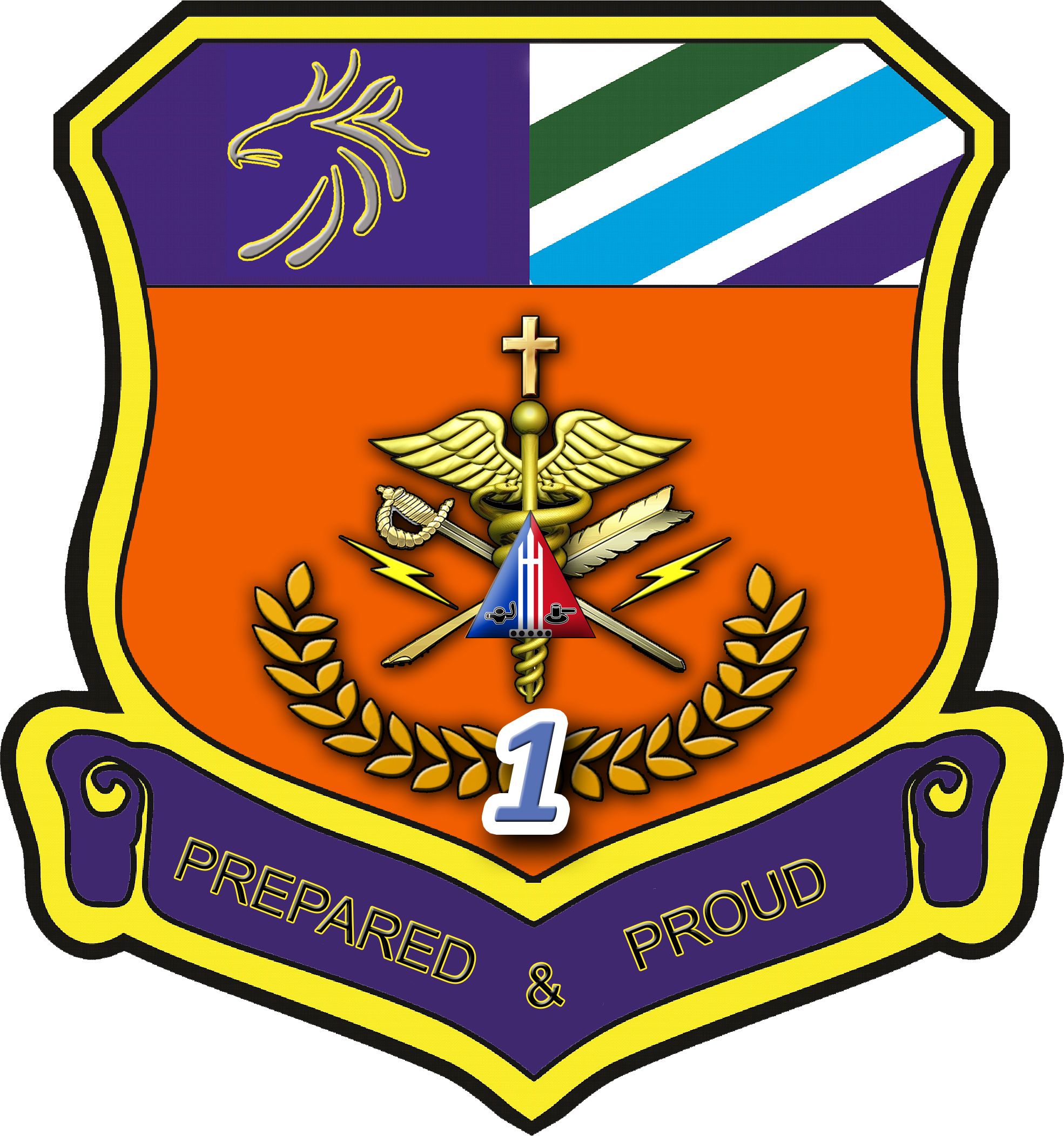
- Unit Seal of the 1051st Technical & Administrative Services Unit (Ready Reserve)
- Active: 1 February 2014 - Present
- Country: Philippines
- Allegiance: Republic of the Philippines
- Branch: Armed Forces of the Philippines
- Type: Technical Services Reserve; Technical Services
- Role: Combat Support and Combat Service Support, SAR and CSAR, Disaster Relief and Rehabilitation Operations, Civil-Military Operations and Civil-military Co-operations, Spec-Ops
- Size: 3 Technical & Administrative Services (Ready Reserve) Detachments and 1 Headquarters & Headquarters Service Company
- Part of: Under the 105th Technical & Administrative Services Group
- Garrison/HQ: Bgy UP Village, Quezon City
- Nickname(s): "First Force Support"
- Motto(s): "Prepared and Proud"
- Mascot(s): Philippine eagle
- Anniversaries: 1 February
- Engagements: None
- Decorations: None

Commanders
- Current commander: MAJ VIRGILIO S FERRER II (RES) JAGS
- Unit Sergeant Major: MSg Mario Francisco (Res) PA
- Notable commanders: MAJ VIRGILIO S FERRER II (RES) JAGS

Insignia
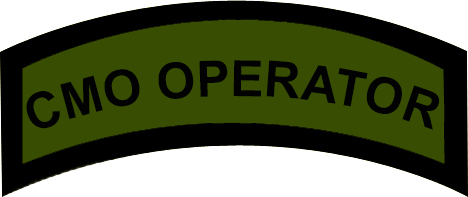
- CMO Operator Tab

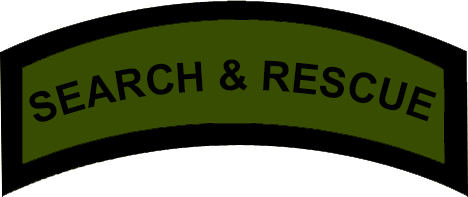
- Search and Rescue Tab

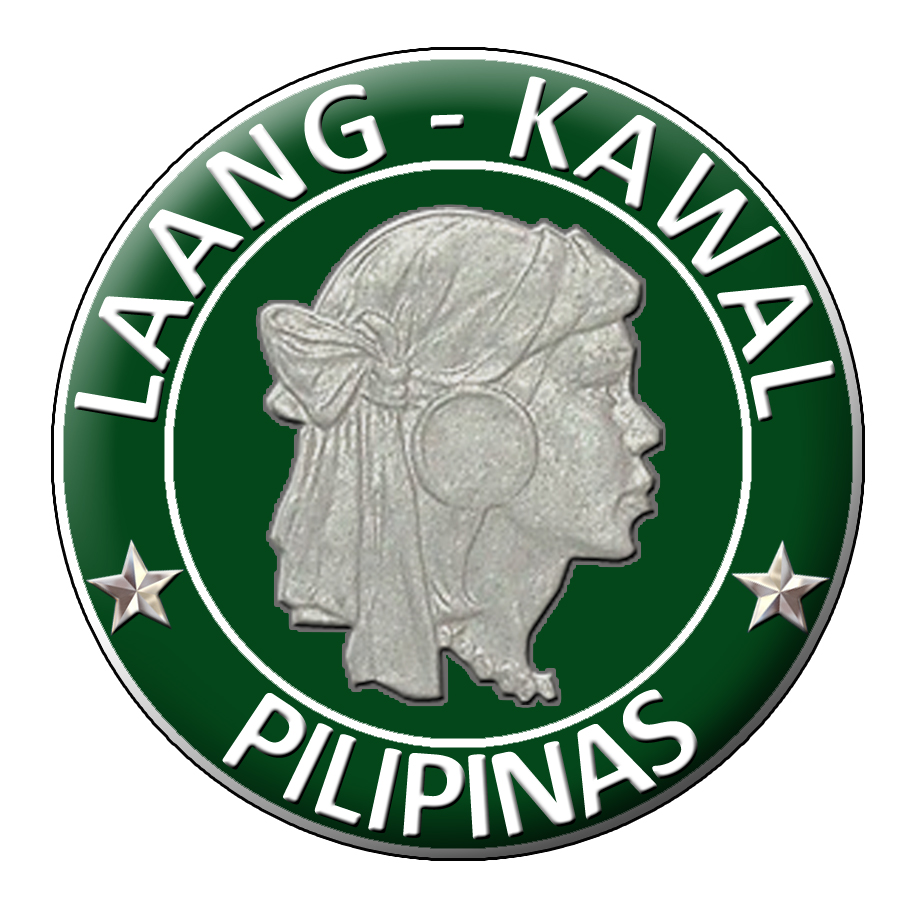
- Laang Kawal Seal

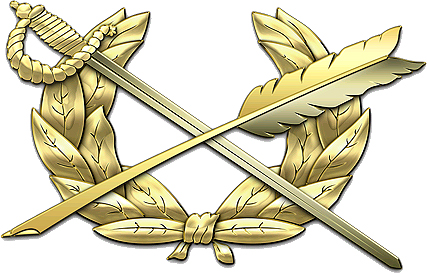
- Philippine Army Staff Judge Advocate Branch Insignia

The 1051st (QUEZON) Technical & Administrative Services Unit, 105th Technical & Administrative Services Group, known officially as First Force Support Unit, is one of two TAS Forward Operating Base Units of the 105th Technical and Administrative Services Group (Reserve) of the AFP Reserve Command, and is based in Quezon City. The unit provides combat support and service support services to the 1502nd Infantry Brigade (Ready Reserve) of the Army Reserve Command.

The unit is a technical service unit, which means it provides various medical, engineering, legal and religious services in support of the various maneuver units of AFP Reserve Force within the area of Quezon City particularly units of the 1502nd Infantry Brigade (Ready Reserve), 15ID(RR), ARESCOM and the 11th Air Force Group (Ready Reserve), 1AFW(R), AFRESCOM.

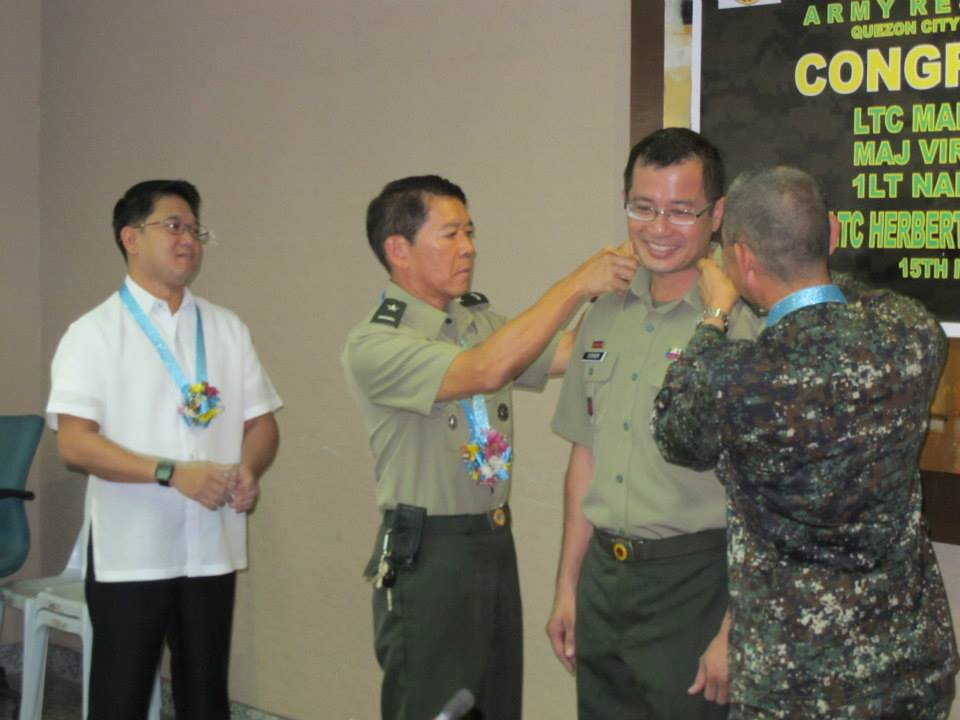
1TASU Commanding Officer - Maj Virgilio Ferrer II during his donning of rank ceremonies at Quezon City Hall.

== The Commissioned Officer Corps ==
Most of the officers of the 1051TASU,105TASG, AFPRESCOM are directly commissioned through AFP Circular Nr. 4 and 6 and may come from any of the following professions, :

- Lawyers and Paralegal Specialists (Judge Advocate General Service)
- Medical Doctors (Medical Corps)
- Nurses (Nurse Corps)
- Dentists (Dental Service)
- Veterinarians (Veterinary Corps)
- Licensed Teachers (Corps of Professors)
- Allied Medical, Business, and Mass Communication Specialists (Medical Administrative Corps)
- Licensed Engineers (Corps of Engineers)
- Ordained Chaplains (Chaplain Service)

== Organization ==
The following are the units that are presently placed under operational control of the 1051st QC Technical & Administrative Services Unit.

=== Base Units ===
- Headquarters & Headquarters Service Company

=== Attached Units ===
- "B" TAS Company
- "C" TAS Company

== Operations ==
- Disaster SAR, Relief and Rehabilitation Operations (TF Glenda) (16 Jul 14 - 17 Jul 14)
- Tree Planting CMO Operations (GHQ-AFP) (2 Aug 14 - 6 Sep 14)
- Medical & Dental Civic Action Program (MEDCAP) (Bgy Pansol, Quezon City) (5 Apr 14)
- Disaster SAR, Relief and Rehabilitation Operations (TF Mario) (19 Sep 14 - 21 Sep 14)
- Tree Planting CMO Operations (Bgy UP Village, Quezon City) (21 Sep 14)
- Security Augmentation Operations (Maginhawa Food Festival) (11 Oct 14)
- Security Augmentation Operations (75th QC Anniversary Float Parade) (12 Oct 14)
- Clean-up CMO Operations (Bgy Tumana, Marikina) (18 Oct 14)
- Medical & Dental Civic Action Program (MEDCAP) (Bgy Kamuning, Quezon City) (08 Feb 15)
- AFP JTF-NCR Contingent 2nd Rescue March Challenge (Manila) (26 Apr 15)
- Brigada Eskwela (ENCAP) (Culiat HS, Quezon City) (18 May 15)
- Medical & Dental Civic Action Program (MEDCAP) (Bgy Olandes, Marikina) (25 Jul 15)
- Medical & Dental Civic Action Program (MEDCAP) (Caloocan HS, Caloocan) (2 Aug 15)
- Medical & Dental Civic Action Program (MEDCAP) (Bgy Nagkaisang Nayon, Quezon City) (5 Sep 15)
- Medical & Dental Civic Action Program (MEDCAP) (Bgy Tatalon, Quezon City) (12 Sep 15)

== Gallery ==
Miscellaneous Gallery

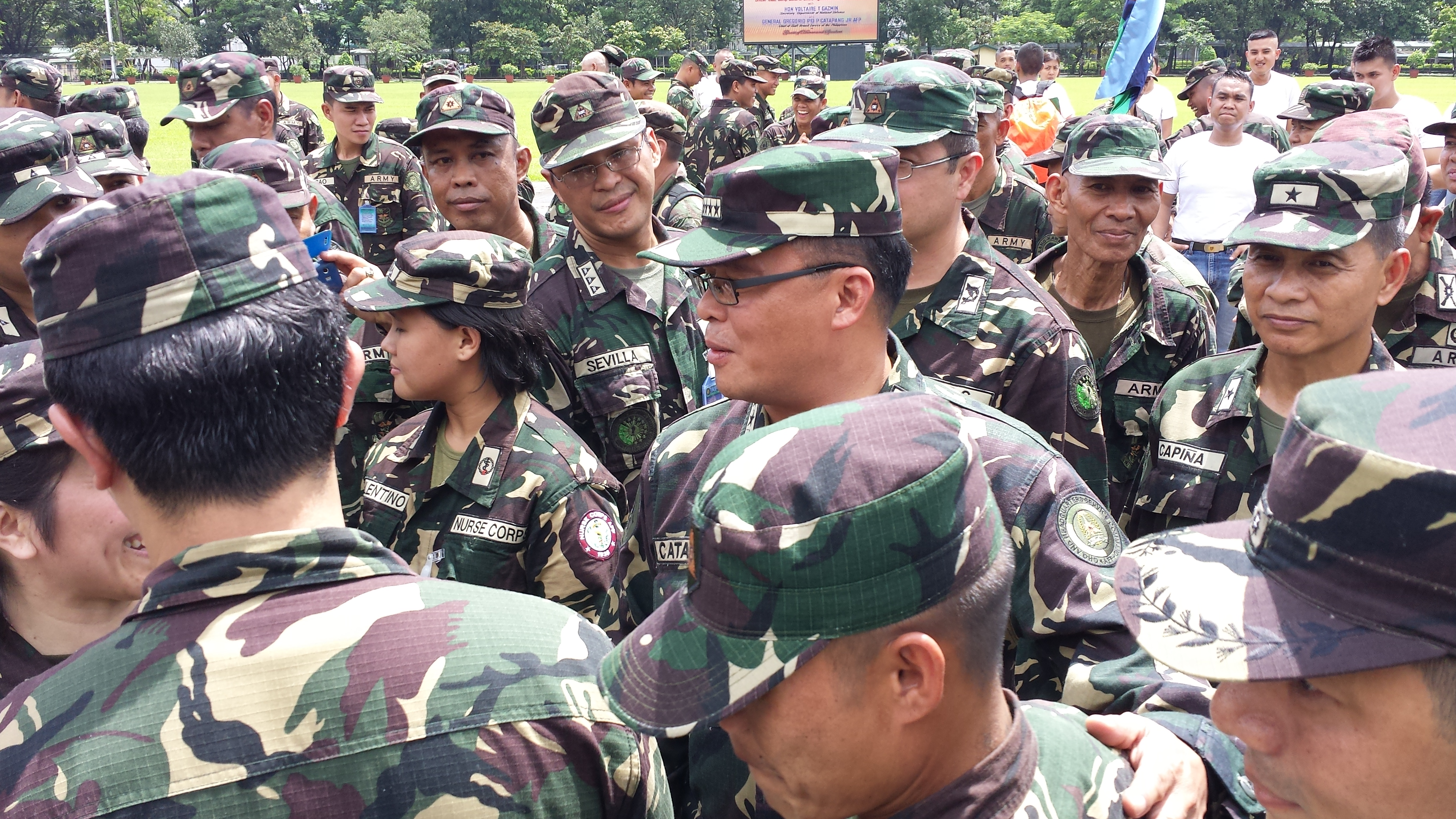
AFP Chief of Staff GEN Gregorio Pio P Catapang AFP shares a light moment with members of the Quezon City TAS Unit during the 35th NRW Celebrations at Camp Aguinaldo, QC.

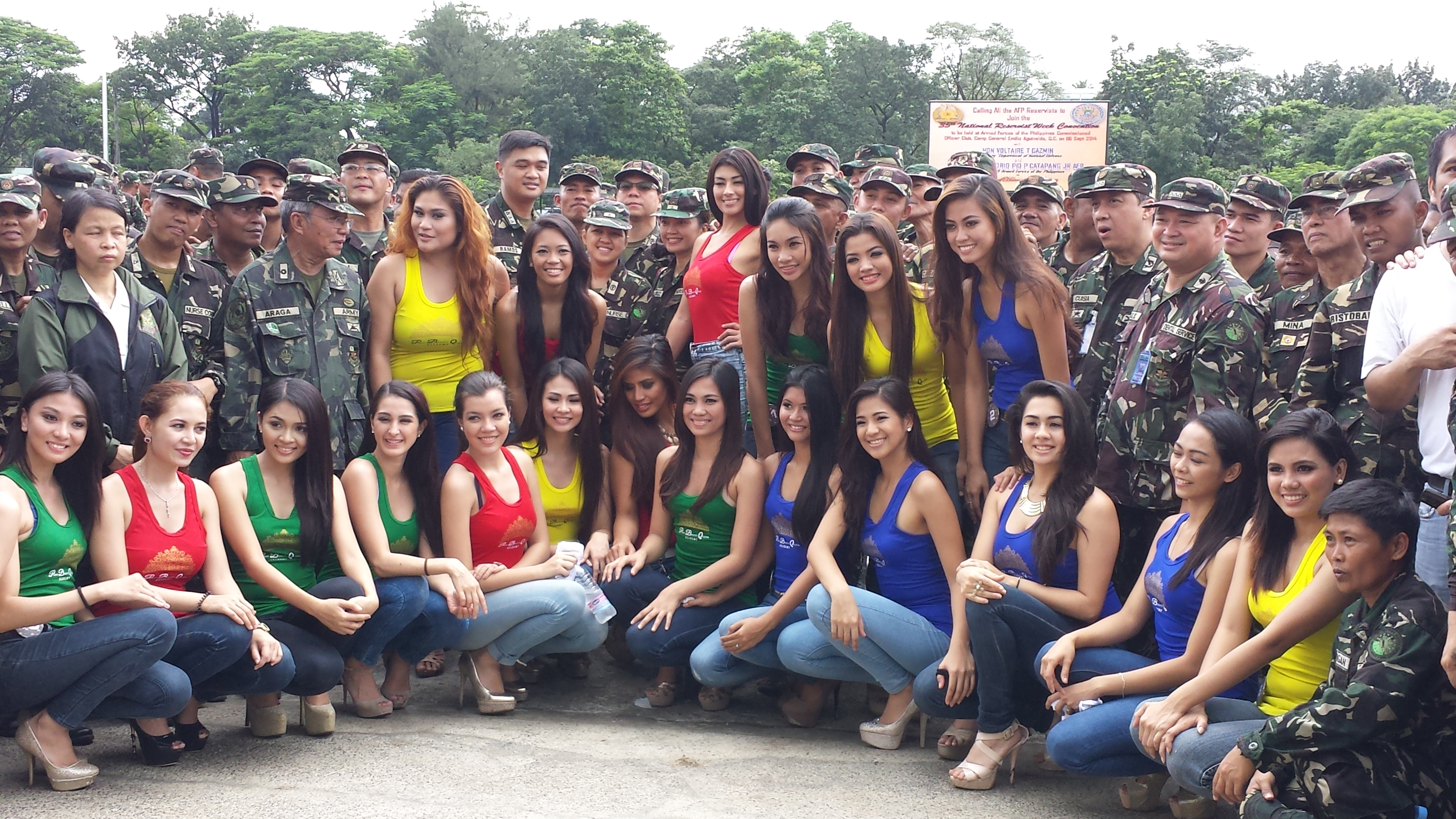
Candidates of the Pinay Beauty Queen Academy enjoy a photo-op with members of the 105th TASG Quezon City Unit under MAJ Virgilio S Ferrer II (RES) JAGS.

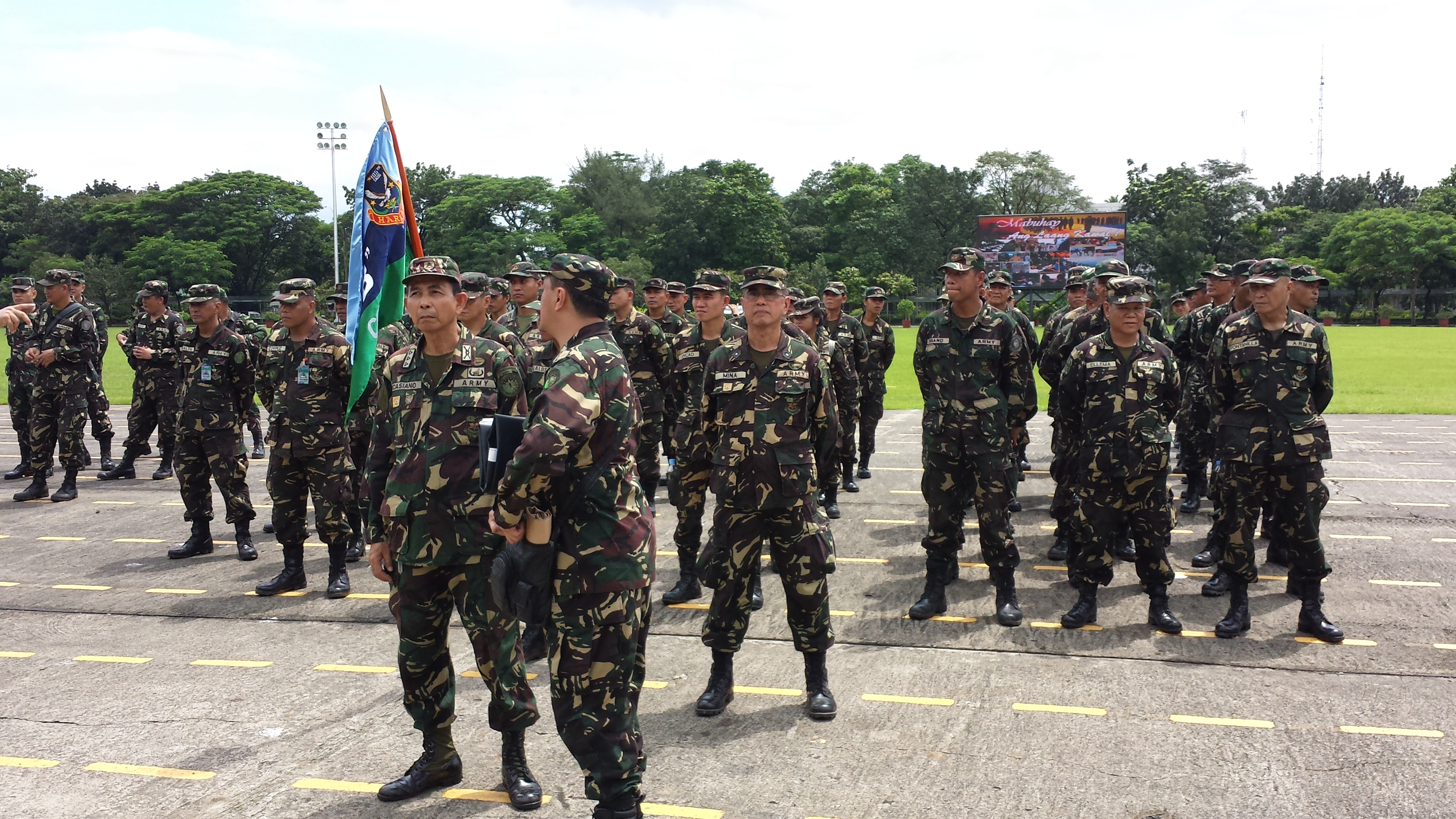
Officers and EPs of the 105th TASG Quezon City Unit assemble as "B" Coy during the 35th NRW held at Camp Aguinaldo, Quezon City.

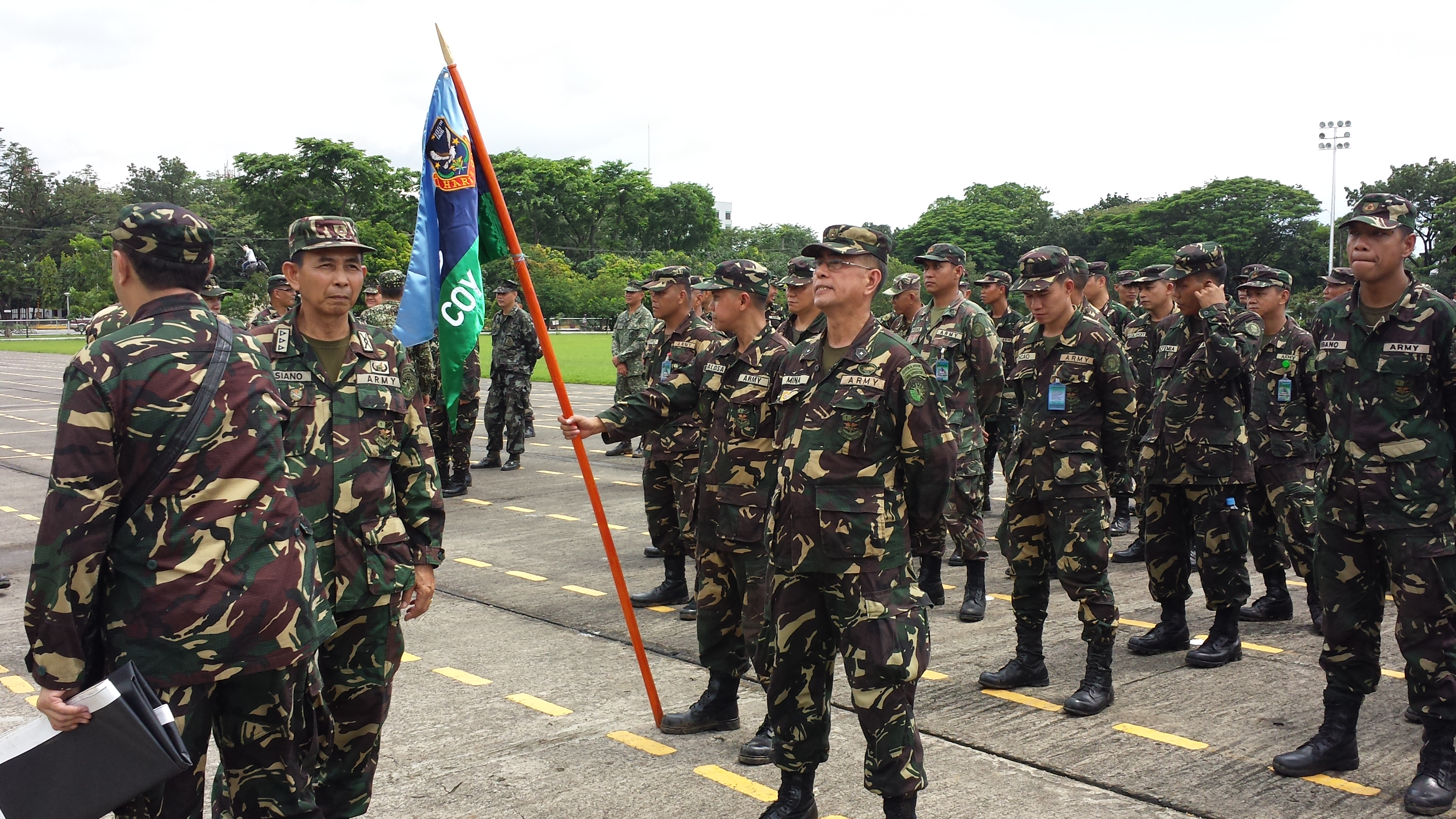
Officers and EPs of the Quezon City Unit of the 105th TASG participated in nationwide celebrations of the 35th NRW.

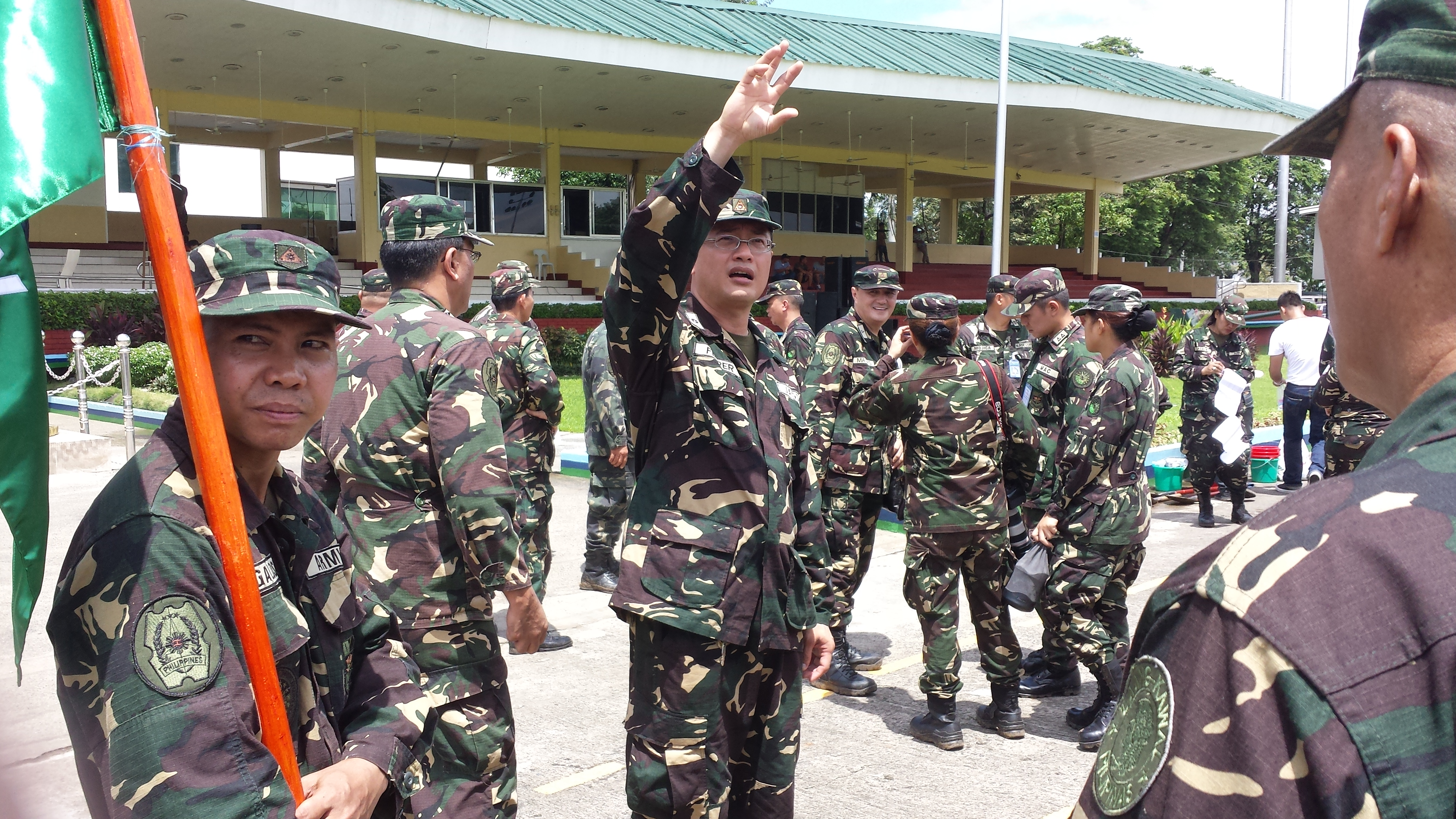
MAJ Virgilio S Ferrer II (RES) JAGS gives instructions to his personnel during the conduct of the 35th NRW Celebrations at Camp Aguinaldo.

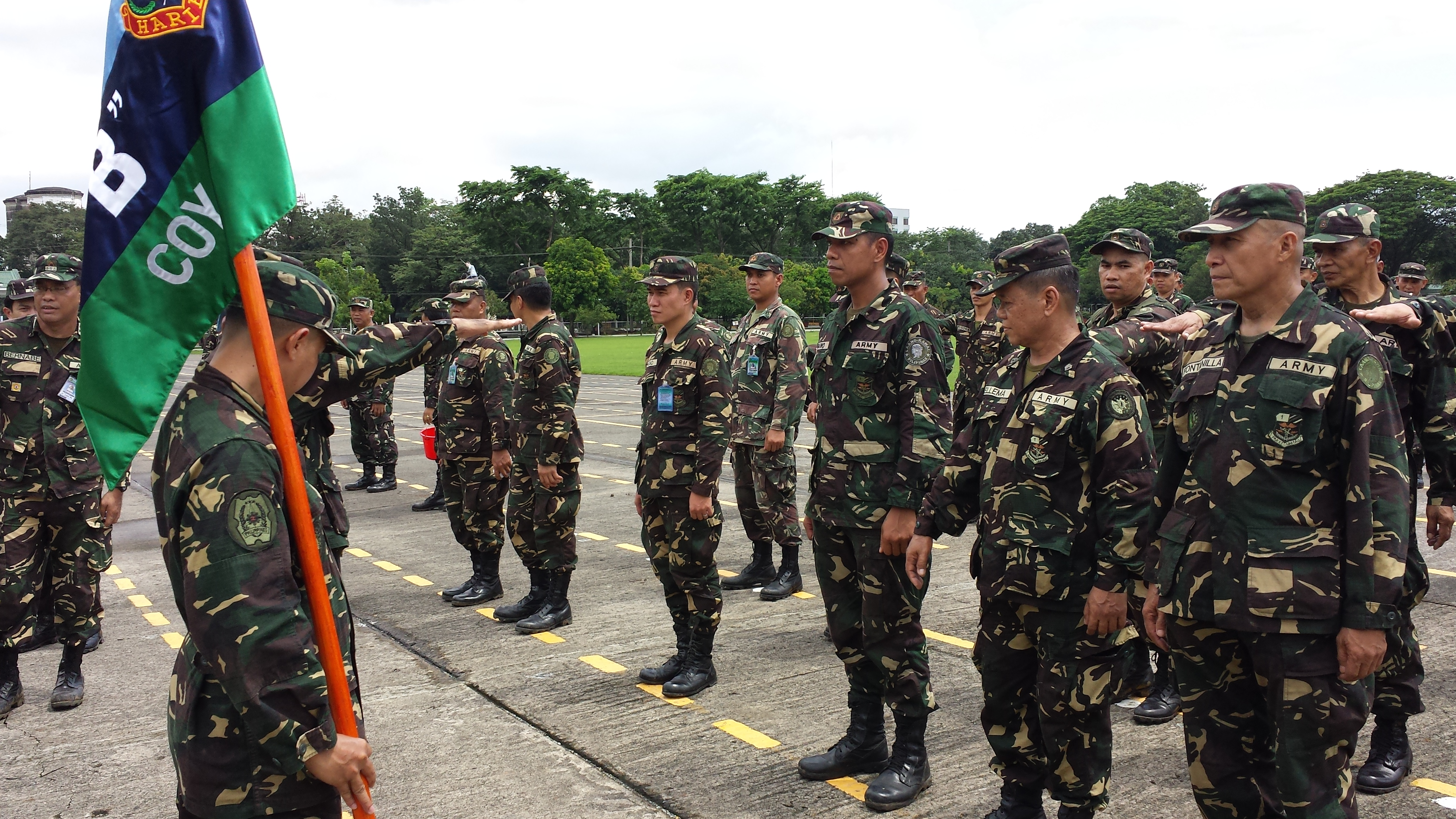
"B" Coy 105th TASG is represented by members of the Quezon City TAS Unit.

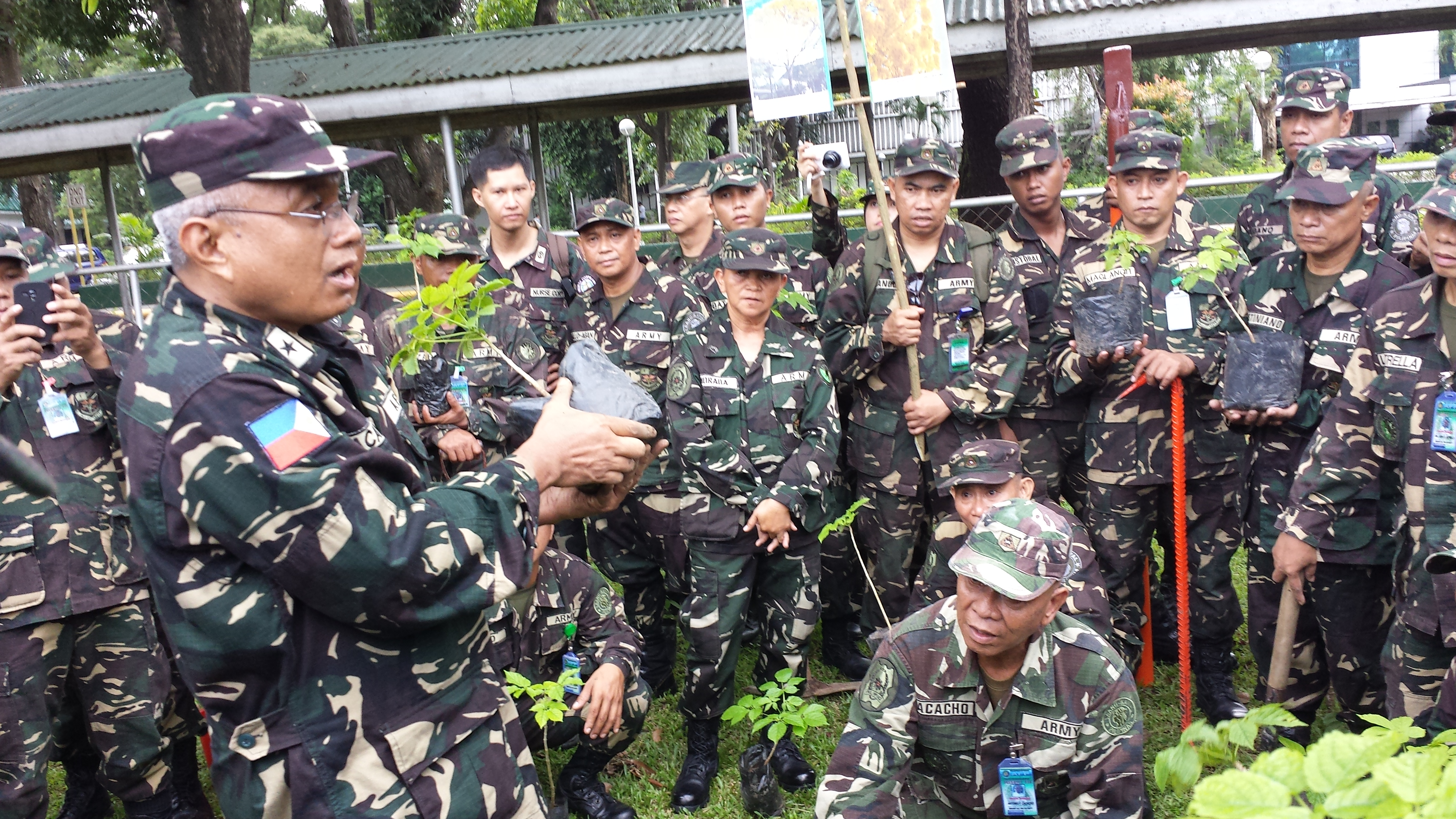
BGEN Johnny Macanas AFP - AFP Deputy J-9 instructs members of the Quezon City TAS Unit in the proper planting and care of a Bukidnon cherry blossom sapling.

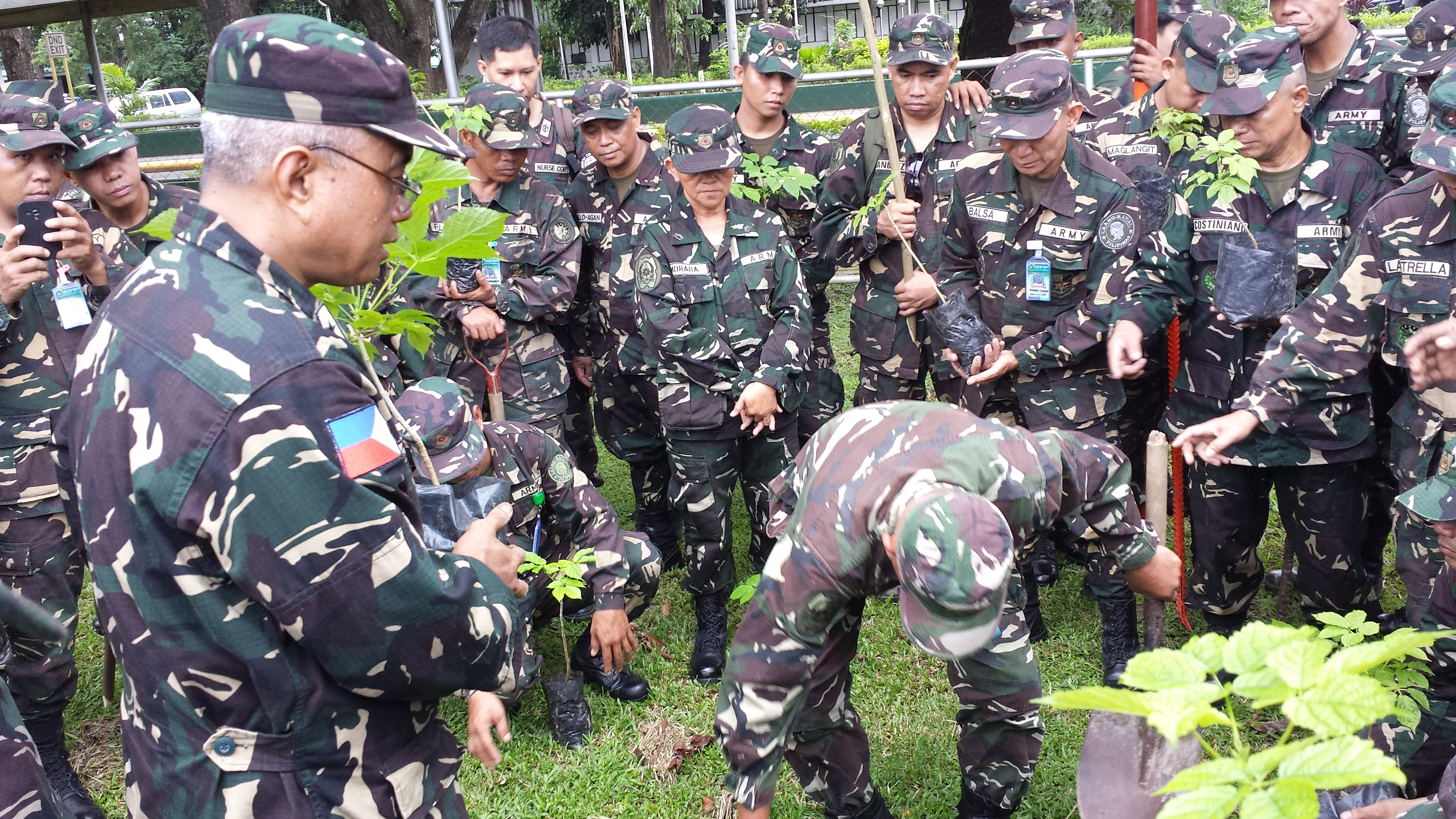
A member of the Quezon City TAS Unit demonstrates the actual planting of a sapling while BGen Johnny Macanas AFP - AFP Deputy J-9 looks on.

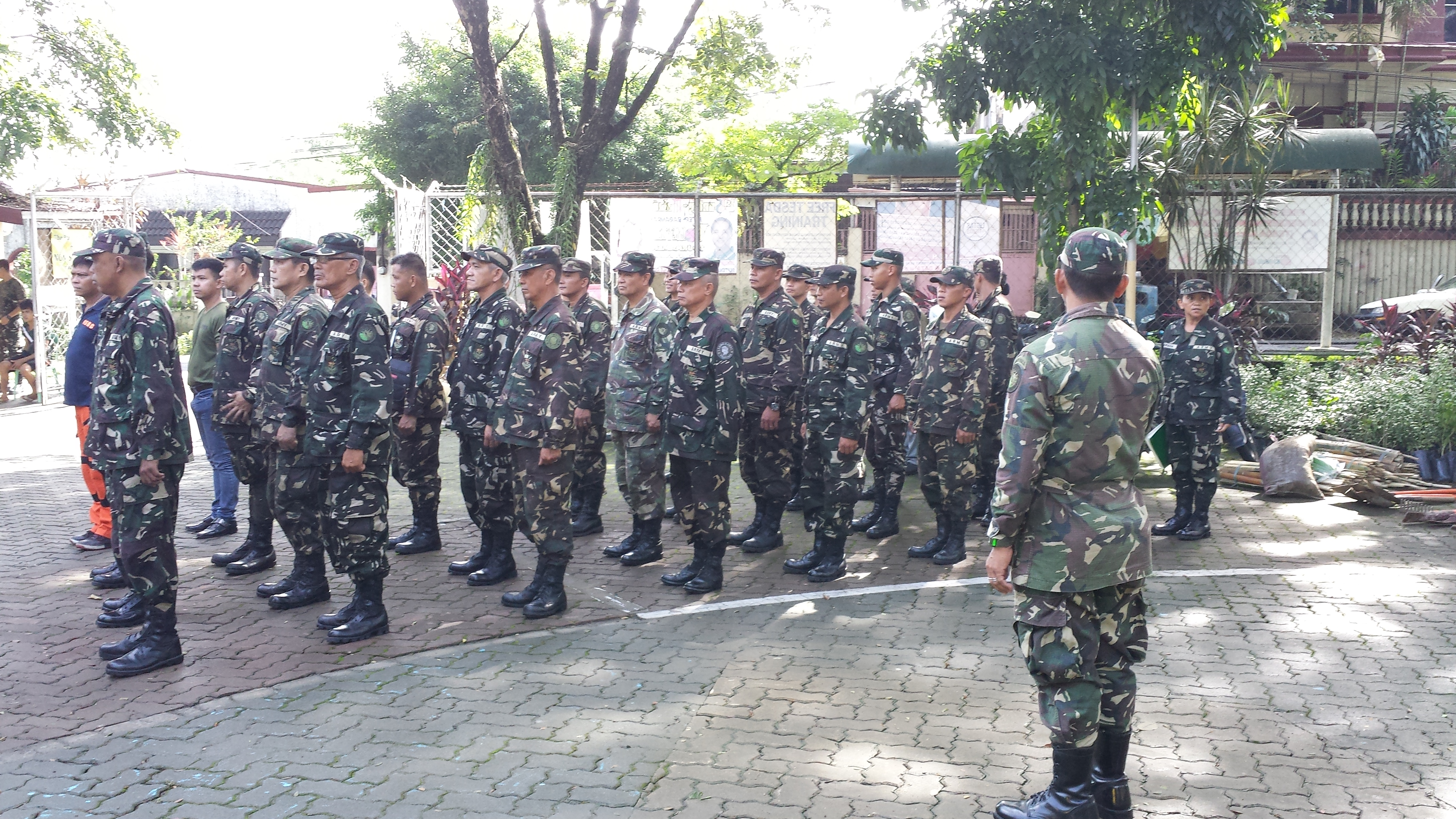
Enlisted personnel of the 1st QC TASU practice basic military drills.

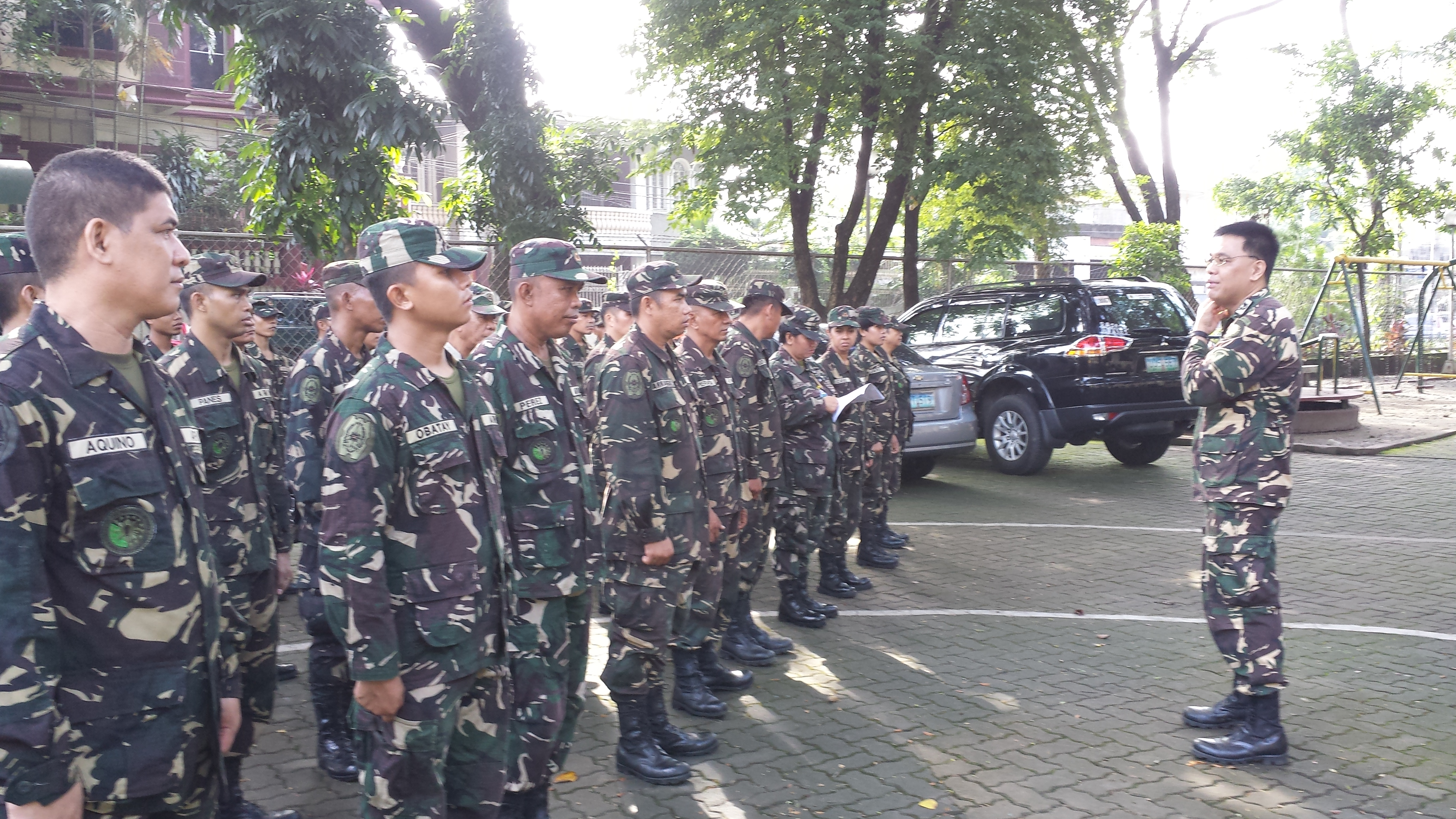
CPT Carlo Antonio M Bernabe (RES) MAC updates the troops regarding operational status of the unit.

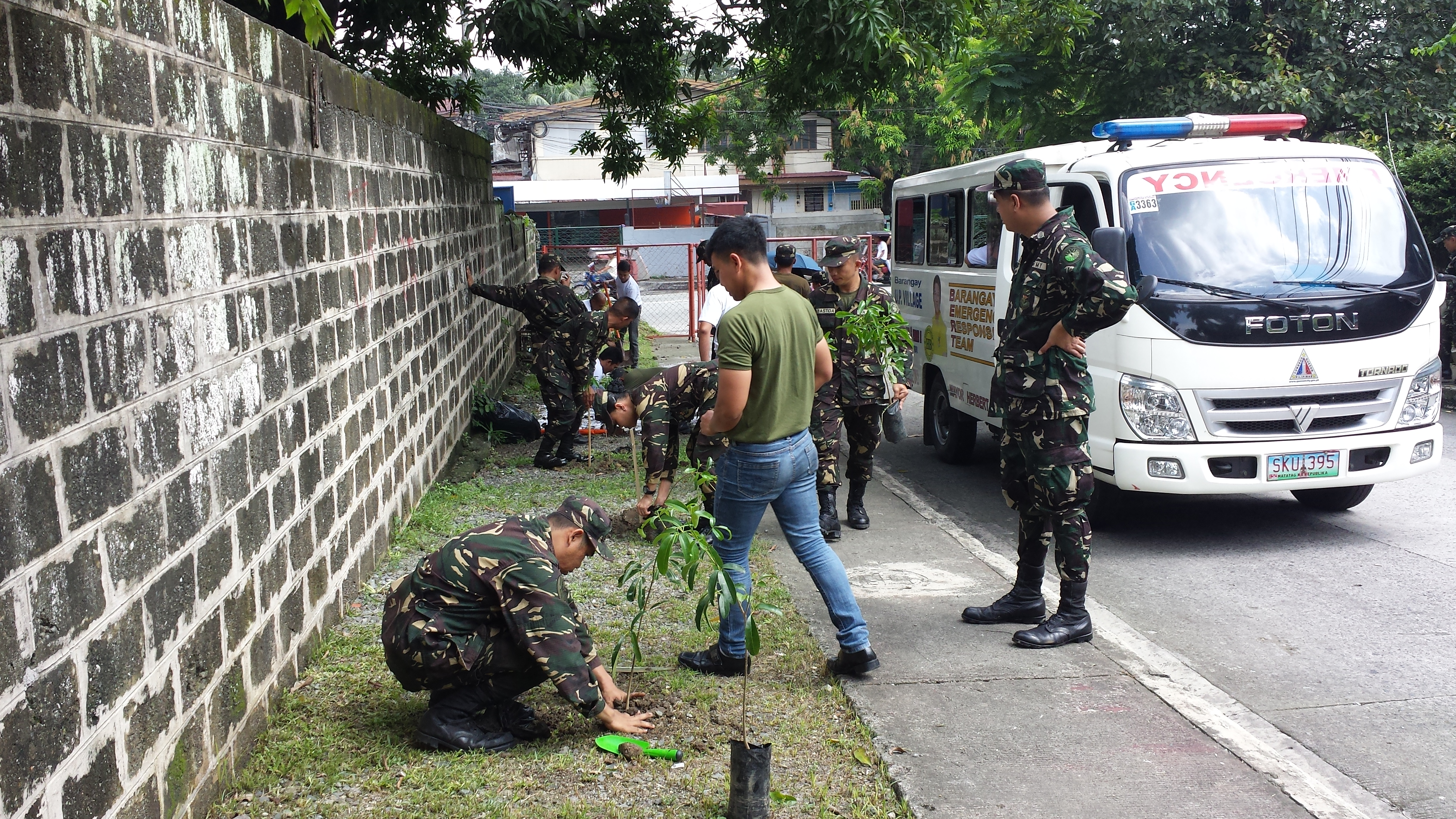
Personnel of the 1st QC TASU conduct treeplanting CMO at Bgy UP Village.

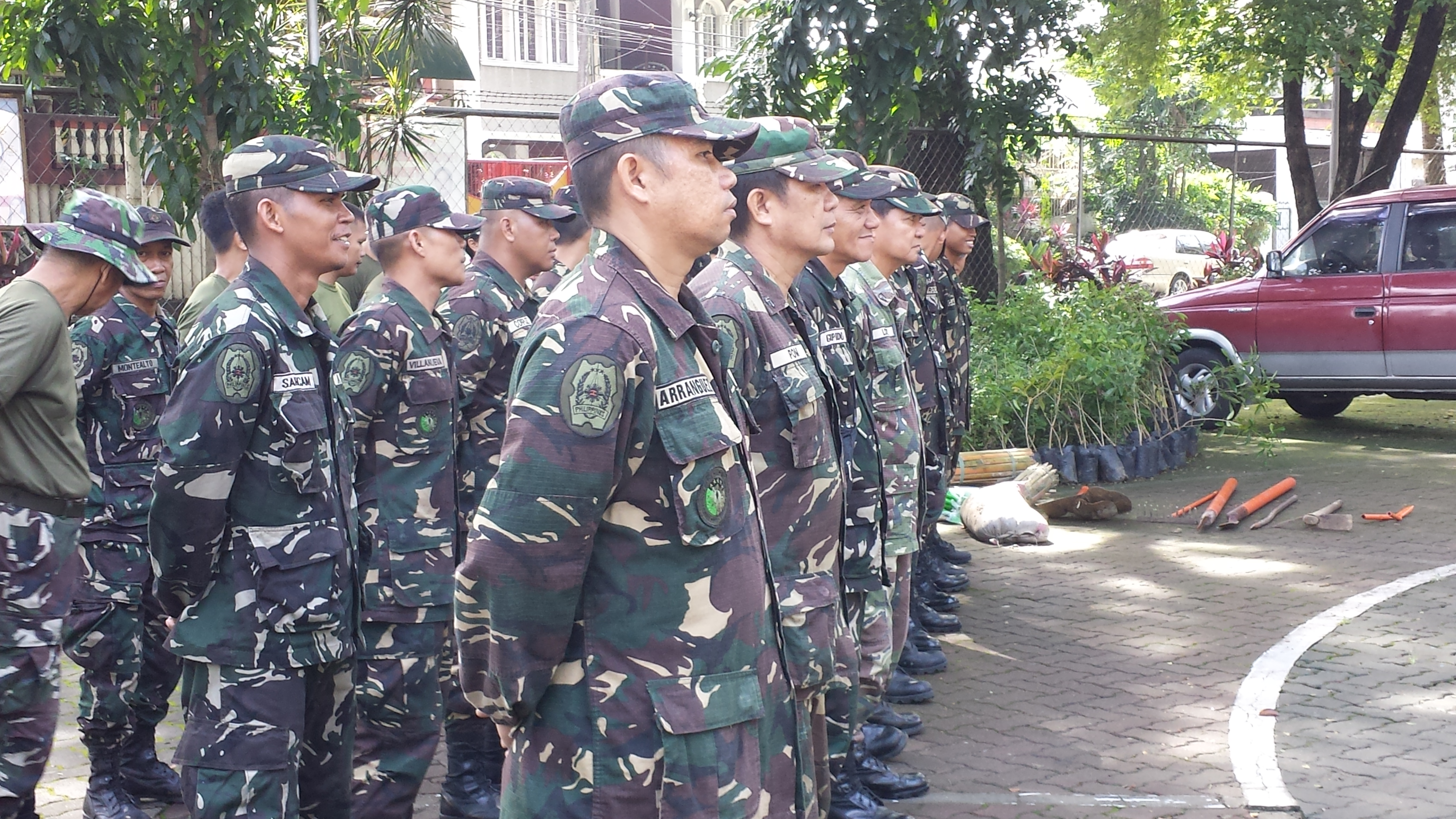
Personnel of the 1st QC TASU await instructions from their officers.

== See also ==
- AFP Reserve Command
- 1502nd Infantry Brigade (Ready Reserve)
- 201st Infantry Battalion (Ready Reserve)
- 202nd Infantry Battalion (Ready Reserve)
- 22nd Infantry Division (Ready Reserve)
