= 22nd Infantry Division (Philippines) =

22nd Infantry Division (Ready Reserve) Division de Infanteria Ligera de Reserva Activa 22
- Country: Philippines
- Allegiance: Republic of the Philippines
- Branch: Philippine Army
- Type: Army Reserve; Light Infantry Division
- Role: Performs multiple military roles in Conventional and Unconventional Warfare, Humanitarian Assistance and Disaster Response (HA/DR), and Civil-Military Operations (CMO)
- Size: 3 Brigades of trained and operational citizen-soldiers
- Part of: Philippine Army Reserve Command
- Garrison/HQ: Almendras Gym, Davao City. Metro Davao
- Nickname(s): Eagle (Agila) Division
- Mascot(s): Philippine eagle
- Battle honours: None

Commanders
- Current commander: COL DOMINADOR N CALAMBA II RES (GSC) PA
- Notable commanders: COL DOMINADOR N CALAMBA II RES (GSC) PA

Insignia
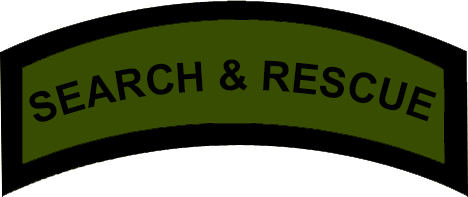
- Search and Rescue Tab

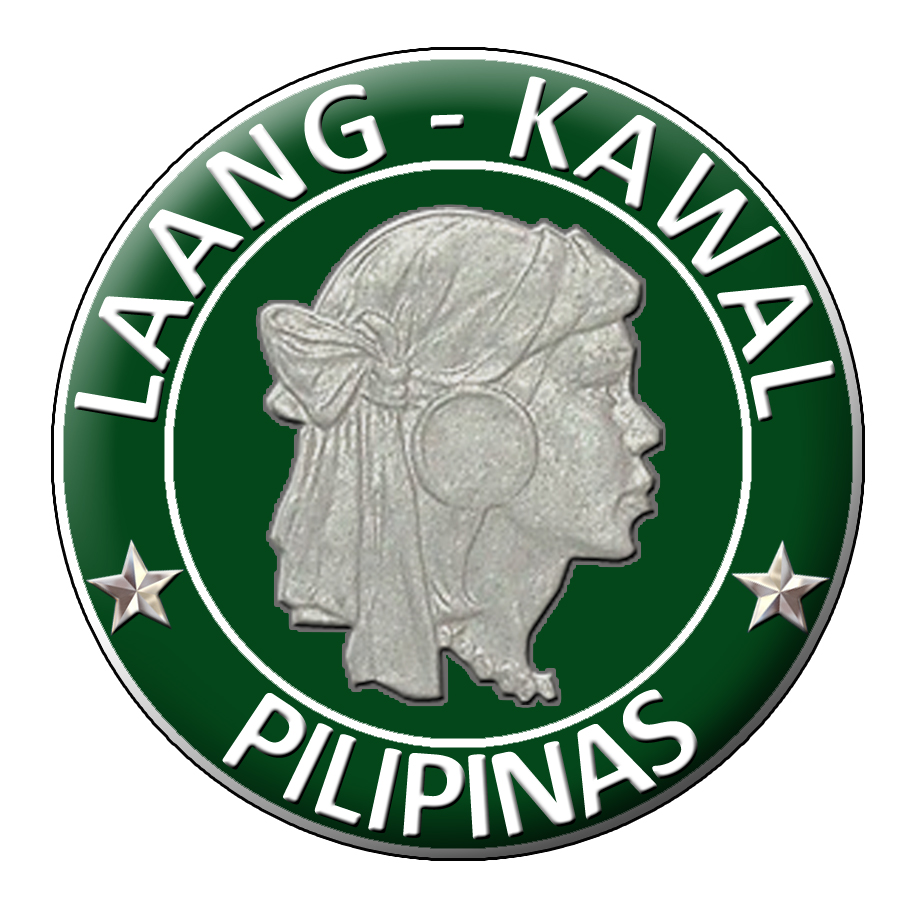
- Laang Kawal Seal

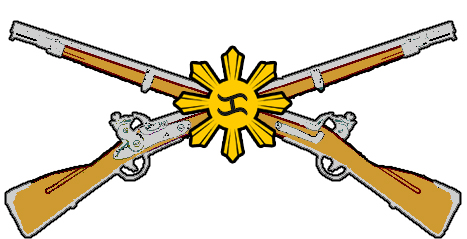
- Philippine Army Infantry Branch Insignia

The 22nd Infantry Division (Ready Reserve), Philippine Army, known as the Eagle Division, is one of the Army Reserve Command's ready reserve infantry divisions.

The unit specializes in Urban Warfare, Urban Search and Rescue, Humanitarian Assistance and Disaster Relief, and Civil-Military Operations. It operates mostly in the Davao Region (Region 11), Sarangani, and South Cotabato Provinces.

== Organization ==
The following are the Base/Brigade units that are under the 22nd Infantry Division (RR).

=== Base Units ===
- Headquarters & Headquarters Service Battalion (HHSBn)
- Service Support Battalion (SSBn)
- Military Police Company (MP Coy)
- Engineering Combat Battalion (ECBn)
- Reconnaissance Battalion (Recon Bn)
- Military Intelligence Battalion (MIBn)

=== Line Units ===
- 2201st Infantry Brigade (Ready Reserve)
- 2202nd Infantry Brigade (Ready Reserve)
- 2203rd Infantry Brigade (Ready Reserve)

== Notable Officers ==
- COL Sara Duterte-Carpio GSC (RES) PA - Current Vice President of the Philippines and former mayor of Davao City[14][15], former Deputy Brigade Commander of the 2202nd Infantry Brigade.
- COL ISIDRO T UNGAB GSC (RES) PA - congressman of third congressional district of Davao City and current brigade commander of the Division's 2202nd Ready Reserve Infantry Brigade and former Battalion Commander of the 3rd Metro Davao Infantry “Maasahan” Battalion, 2202Bde.
- COL Emmanuel "Manny" D.Pacquiao (RES) PA - congressman of Sarangani's lone district and currently the commanding officer of the Division's 2203rd Infantry Brigade.
- LTC Allan L. Rellon (RES) PA - current mayor of Tagum City and battalion commander of the Division's 1st Davao Del Norte Infantry Battalion (Ready Reserve), 2201st Brigade

== See also ==
- Army Reserve Command
- 15th Infantry Division (Ready Reserve)
- AFP EASTMINCOM
