= 202nd Infantry Battalion (Ready Reserve) =

202 Infantry Battalion (Ready Reserve)
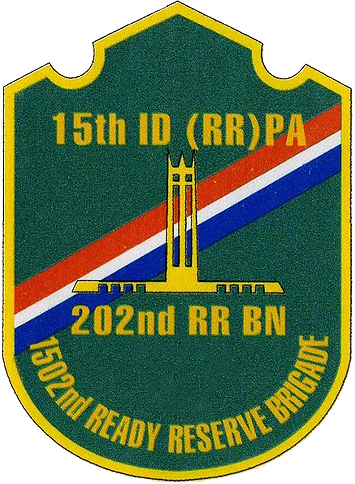
- Unit Seal of the 202nd Infantry Battalion (Ready Reserve)
- Active: 20 July 2006 – Present
- Country: Philippines
- Allegiance: Republic of the Philippines
- Branch: Philippine Army
- Type: Army Reserve; Light Infantry Battalion
- Role: Conventional and Unconventional Warfare, Guerrilla warfare, Counter-guerrilla Operations, SAR and CSAR, Disaster Relief and Rehabilitation Operations, Civil-Military Operations and Civil-military Co-operations, Spec-Ops, MOUT
- Size: 3 Ready Reserve Companies and 1 Headquarters & Headquarters Service Company
- Part of: Under the 1502nd Quezon City Ready Reserve Brigade
- Garrison/HQ: Bgy New Era, Quezon City
- Nickname: "The Second to None 202nd"
- Mottos: "Honor and Bravery"
- Mascot: Quezon Monument
- Anniversaries: 20 July
- Engagements: None
- Decorations: Philippine Republic Presidential Unit Citation Badge

Commanders
- Current commander: MAJ ROMEO R RILLON (RES) PA
- Notable commanders: MAJ ROMEO R RILLON (RES) PA

Insignia
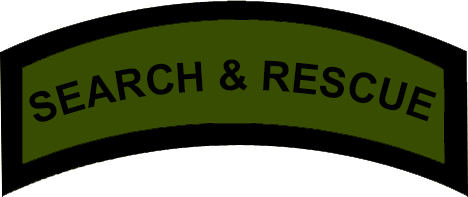
- Search and Rescue Tab

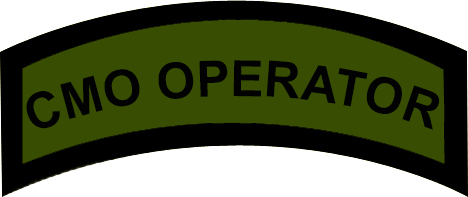
- CMO Operator Tab

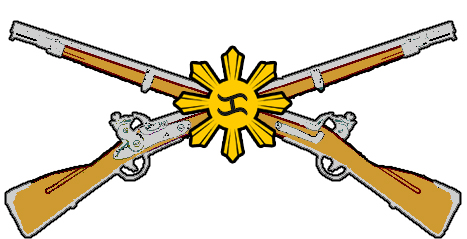
- Philippine Army Infantry Branch Insignia

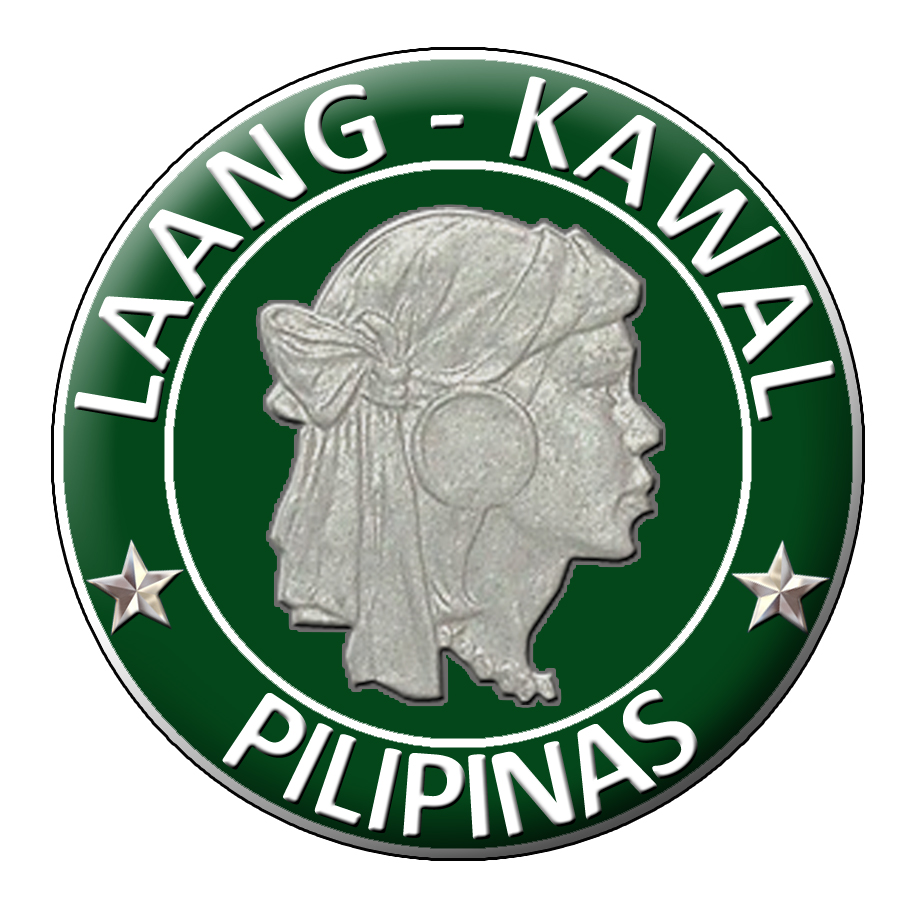
- Laang Kawal Seal

The 202nd QC Ready Reserve Battalion, 1502nd Infantry Brigade (Ready Reserve), known officially as The Second to None 202nd, is one of the battalions of the Philippine Army Reserve Command, which is organic to the 1502nd Quezon City Ready Reserve Brigade. It is an infantry unit, and specializes in MOUT, disaster relief, and Civil Military Operations.

== Organization ==
The following are the units that are presently placed under operational control of the 202nd QC Ready Reserve Battalion: Notable Commanders;

- Brigadier General. Reynaldo B, Ebron†
- Major. Romeo R, Rillon

=== Base units ===
- Headquarters & Headquarters Company

=== Line units ===
- "A" (DEARRT) Company
- "B" Infantry Company
- "C" Infantry Company

=== Full Set Of Ranks ===
Commissioned Officials

- Brigadier General
- Colonel
- Lieutenant Colonel
- Major
- Captain
- First Lieutenant
- Second Lieutenant

Non Commissioned Officers

- First Chief Master Sergeant
- Chief Master Sergeant
- Senior Master Sergeant
- Master Sergeant
- Technical Sergeant
- Staff Sergeant
- Sergeant
- Corporal
- Private First Class
- Private

== Operations ==
- Security Augmentation – ASEAN Regional Summit (11 Jan 7 – 14 Jan 07)
- Disaster SAR, Relief and Rehabilitation Operations (TF Ondoy) (27 Sep 9 – 15 Oct 09)
- Security Operations OPLAN Kaluluwa (TF Casper) (21 Oct 9 – 2 Nov 09)
- Security Operations (TF HOPE) (2010 Elections) (9 May 2010 – 12 May 2010)
- Disaster SAR, Relief and Rehabilitation Operations (TF Habagat) (05 Aug 12 – 12 Aug 12)
- Disaster SAR, Relief and Rehabilitation Operations (TF Maring) (16 Aug 13 – 24 Aug 13)
- Relief Operations (TF Yolanda) (6 Nov 13 – 15 Nov 13)
- Standby Augmentation Force (Ormoc) (TF Yolanda) (6 Nov 13 – 15 Nov 13)
- Disaster SAR, Relief and Rehabilitation Operations (TF Glenda) (16 Jul 14 - 17 Jul 14)
- Disaster SAR, Relief and Rehabilitation Operations (TF Mario) (19 Sep 14 - 21 Sep 14)

== Awards and decorations ==
=== Campaign streamers ===
Award Streamer	Streamer Name	Operation	Date Awarded	Reference
	Presidential Unit Citation Badge	SAR/DRR Ops, TS Ketsana	4 February 2010	General Orders No. 112, GHQ-AFP, dated 4 February 2010
	Presidential Unit Citation Badge	General Elections, Philippines	1 July 2010	General Orders No. 641, GHQ-AFP, dated 1 July 2010

=== Badges ===
Military Badge	Badge Name	Operation	Date Awarded	Reference
	AFP Election Duty Badge	General Elections, Philippines	21 May 2010	General Orders No. 513, GHQ-AFP, dated 21 May 2010

== See also ==
- 1502nd Infantry Brigade (Ready Reserve)
- 201st Infantry Battalion (Ready Reserve)
- 1st Technical & Administrative Services Battalion (Ready Reserve)
